= George Vance Allen =

British bacteriologist and vice-chancellor (1894–1970)

Sir George Allen CBE
- Bromide print commissioned by the National Portrait Gallery, 1954

1st Vice-Chancellor of the University of Malaya
- In office 1949–1952
- Chancellor: Malcolm MacDonald
- Preceded by: Office established
- Succeeded by: Sir Sydney Caine

Principal of Raffles College
- In office 1947–1949
- Preceded by: Wilfred Edward Dyer
- Succeeded by: Office abolished

Principal of King Edward VII College of Medicine
- In office 1930–1947
- Preceded by: Hugh Macalister
- Succeeded by: Desmond William G. Faris

Personal details
- Born: George Vance Allen; 16 April 1894 Donegal, Ireland
- Died: 2 October 1970 (aged 76) Canterbury, Kent, England
- Spouses: Sybil May Seaton (m. 1922; died 1953) Oriane Frances Tomkins (m. 1954)
- Children: 2
- Education: Queen's University Belfast (MB BCh BAO MD); London School of Tropical Medicine (DTM&H)

Military service
- Allegiance: United Kingdom
- Branch/service: Royal Army Medical Corps
- Years of service: 1917–1920
- Rank: Captain
- Battles/wars: East African campaign

Sir George Vance Allen CBE (16 April 1894 – 2 October 1970) was an Anglo-Irish British (Note: Allen was born in Donegal, Ireland, while Ireland was part of the UK. His nationality is listed as "National of the United Kingdom" rather than "Southern Irish (Eire)" in the records of internees at Changi Prison internment camp.) medical doctor, bacteriologist and academic administrator who served as the first Vice-Chancellor of the University of Malaya.

== Early life and education ==
Allen was born on 16 April 1894 in Donegal, Ireland. His parents were Samuel Allen, a Methodist minister, and Eliza Anne Allen (née Vance).

Allen grew up in Belfast, after his father moved to a ministry there. From 1907 he attended the Methodist College Belfast, where he was in the Rugby first XV and Cricket first XI. He graduated in medicine from Queen's University Belfast.

== Military service and early career ==
Allen served with the Royal Army Medical Corps in East Africa from 1917 to 1920. He attained the rank of captain.

From October to December 1920, Allen undertook postgraduate study at the London School of Tropical Medicine leading to the award of a Diploma in Tropical Medicine and Hygiene (DTM&H) by the Royal College of Physicians.

On 4 February 1921, Allen was appointed to be an assistant bacteriologist at the Medical Research Laboratory in Nairobi. He worked in Kenya for six years, being promoted to senior bacteriologist in 1925.

Following his time in Nairobi, Allen undertook further postgraduate work in pathology in England, at Oxford and in the hospitals of London. In 1927 he attained a Doctor of Medicine (MD) degree from Queen's University Belfast.

== Career in British Malaya ==
=== Pre-war ===
At the start of 1928, Allen moved to the Federated Malay States, then a protected state of the British Empire, to become a bacteriologist in Kuala Lumpur's Institute for Medical Research. He acted as the institute's director for nearly a year across 1928 and 1929 while Allen Neave Kingsbury, the permanent director, was absent on leave.

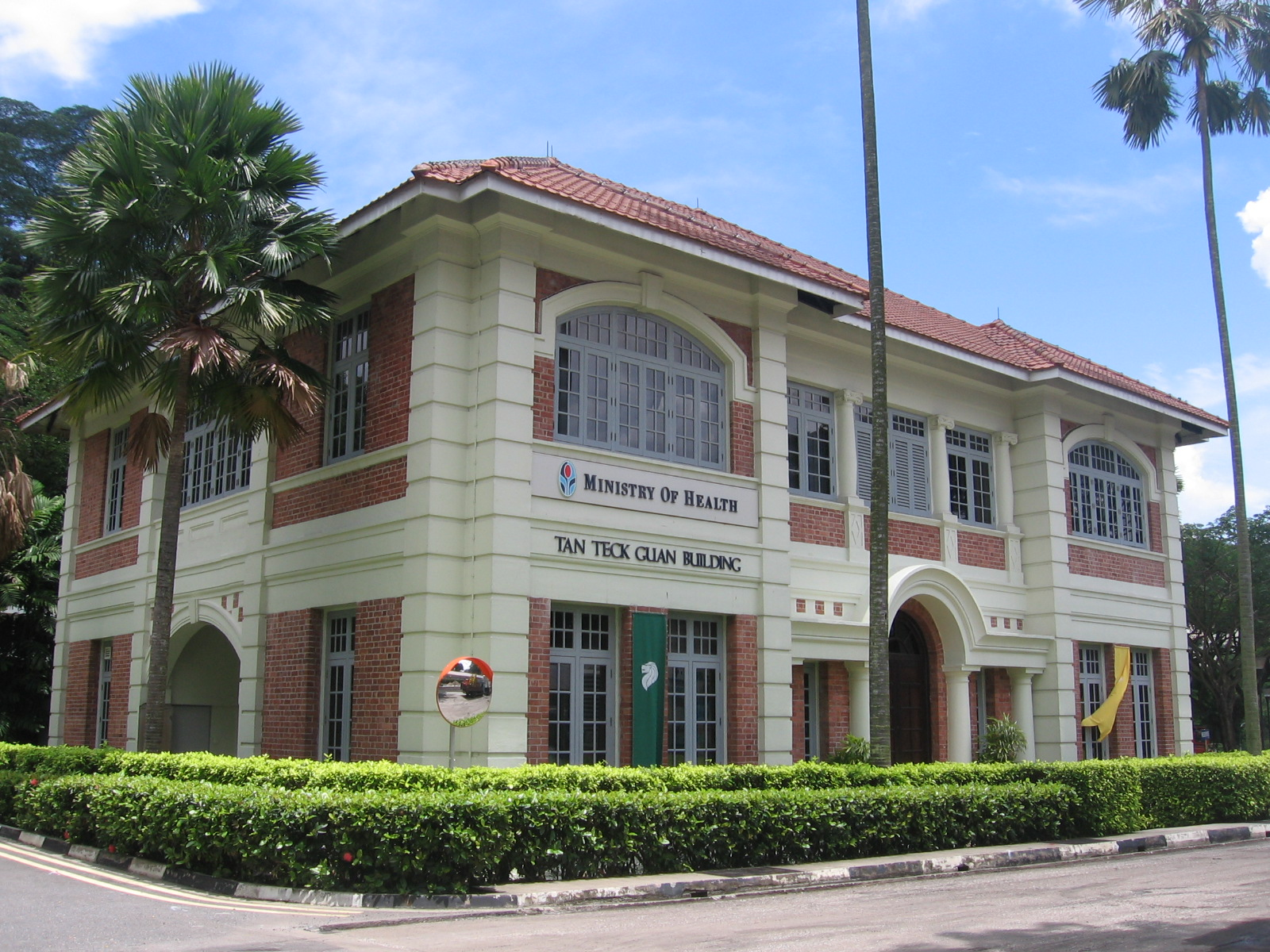
Tan Teck Guan Building in Singapore, location of the office of the medical college's principal

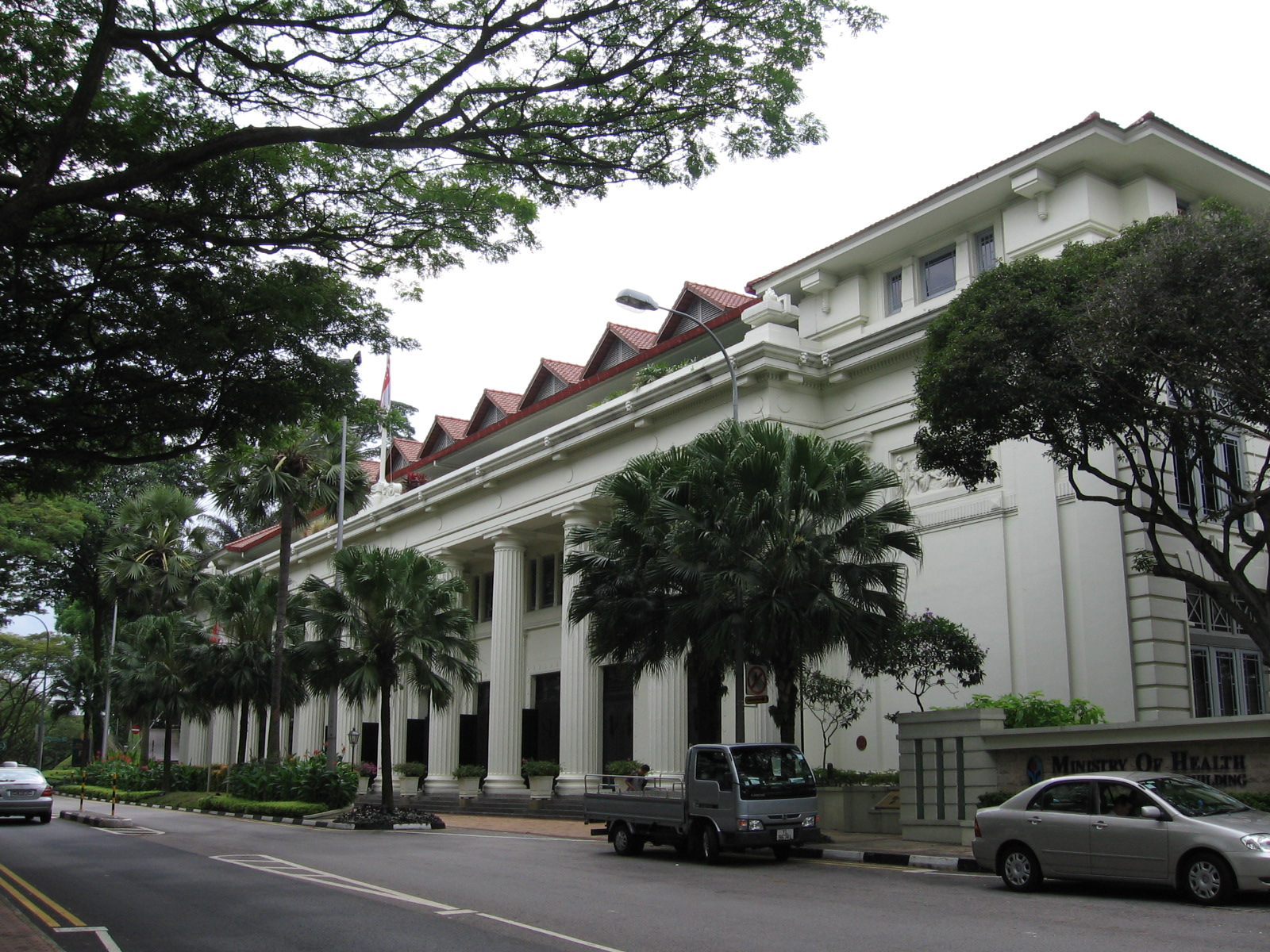
College of Medicine Building in Singapore

In June 1929, Allen was appointed acting principal of King Edward VII College of Medicine in Singapore, then a part of the Straits Settlements crown colony. He was to deputise in the absence of Hugh Macalister, who had returned to Scotland on leave for ill health. Macalister in fact never returned to Singapore, retiring on account of his declining health shortly before his death on 2 November 1930 at the age of 51. Allen was confirmed as the permanent principal of the College with effect from 14 March 1930. While principal, Allen was also Professor of Clinical Medicine.

In addition to being principal of the medical college, from April 1932 Allen additionally served as president of Raffles College. In the few years since the college began admitting students in 1928, the colonial government's Director of Education had served concurrently as its president. This practice was criticised as creating a conflict of interest for the director, and resulting in a part-time president for the college. The appointment of Allen was welcomed as the potential first step towards a merger of Raffles College and the College of Medicine, but criticised as another part-time appointment. Allen served as concurrent head of both colleges until 1934, but by March 1935 the Director of Education was once again serving as president of Raffles College, while Allen continued as principal of the medical college only.

Allen served as the founding editor of the Journal of the Malayan Branch of the British Medical Association. The journal was published quarterly; the British Medical Journal reported receiving the first issue in August 1939.

=== World War II ===
As Singapore came under bombardment from the Japanese military in January 1942, Allen lead the College to serve as the island centre for blood transfusion. He also began to encourage people to grow more food in case supplies to the island were cut off. On 15 February, the British surrendered Singapore to the Japanese and the island fell under military occupation. From 17 February, Allen and his colleagues were initially imprisoned in a temporary civilian internment camp comprising a police station, a school and nearby houses. The College of Medicine ceased to function during the occupation, with the Imperial Japanese Army's Medical Corp using the college's buildings instead.

On 6 March, Allen and the many other internees were transferred to Changi Prison, now co-opted to serve as an internment camp. The camp officers permitted the inmates to organise their own internal affairs. Allen chaired a committee of inmates seeking to improve the quality of food available to prisoners. The group managed to improvise a balanced diet "from inadequate and unlikely sources which must have saved a good many lives", and were "instrumental in saving much serious illness". The committee continued to work after the civilian internees were transferred to Sime Road camp on 1 May 1944.

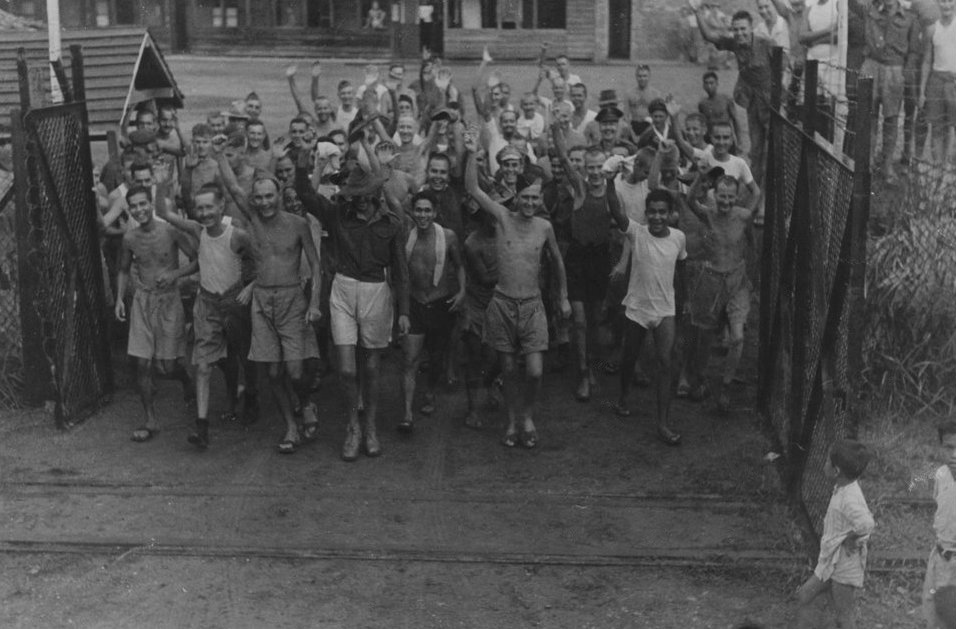
Allied prisoners after the liberation of the Singapore camps, c. 1945

Following Japan's formal surrender to the Allies on 2 September 1945, the Japanese forces occupying Singapore surrendered to the British on 12 September. In the 1946 New Year Honours, Allen was awarded a CBE for "services during internment". For the rest of his life he would periodically be incapacitated by a leg ailment caused by his time in internment. The Medical College re-opened on 20 June 1946, with Allen resuming his position as principal.

=== Post-war ===
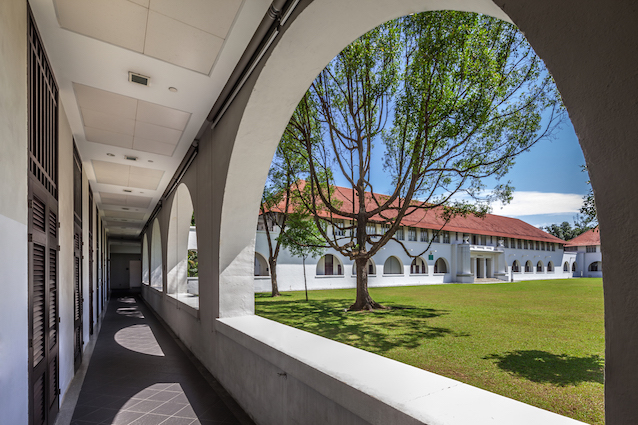
Formerly Raffles College, now the Bukit Timah campus of the National University of Singapore

In 1947, Allen was appointed principal-designate of the envisioned new university college to be created by amalgamating King Edward VII College and Raffles College. Allen thereupon relinquished his position as principal of the College of Medicine, and was replaced by Desmond William G. Faris.

A commission chaired by Sir Alexander Carr-Saunders was tasked with determining the specifics of the new university college. The commissioners had toured the two crown colonies of Singapore and the Malayan Union, as they had become in the aftermath of the war, between March and April 1947. In the commission's report of April 1948, it recommended that instead of a precursory university college affiliated to the University of London, a full Malayan university with the power to confer its own degrees should be established as soon as possible. The commission's conclusions were influenced by the political situation in the region: among other grievances, the proposed availability of Malayan citizenship to all residents was deeply unpopular with ethnic Malays, who felt their interests had been betrayed. Carr-Saunders believed that establishing a Malayan university "could serve a valuable political purpose, firstly by becoming an object of pride and loyalty which would knit together the diverse races of the country and secondly, by enhancing the prestige of Malaya in Southeast Asia as a whole."

Upon its official foundation on 8 October 1949, Allen became the first Vice-Chancellor of the new University of Malaya. Since 1949 Allen had once again been serving as principal of Raffles College and was therefore the college's final principal.

The new university had three faculties: King Edward VII College became the faculty of medicine, Raffles College became the faculties of arts and science. The geologist and physicist Elizabeth Alexander served as temporary registrar during the setting up of the university. The first dean of the science faculty was Alexander's husband, Norman, professor of physics at Raffles College, and another fellow internee with Allen in Changi Prison and Sime Road Camp. Alexander Oppenheim, deputy principal and professor of mathematics at Raffles College, and dean of the informal "POW University" established in the Changi prisoner-of-war camp, became the first dean of the arts faculty. Faris, Allen's successor as principal of the medical college, became the first dean of the medicine faculty.

Allen was knighted in the 1952 New Year Honours, and in March of the same year was awarded an honorary Doctorate of Laws (LLD) by the University Malaya. He had planned to retire as vice-chancellor in June that year, but in fact left Singapore for England in April to be with his seriously-ill wife in London. He did not return to his university office, and was succeeded as Vice-Chancellor by Sir Sydney Caine.

== Later life ==
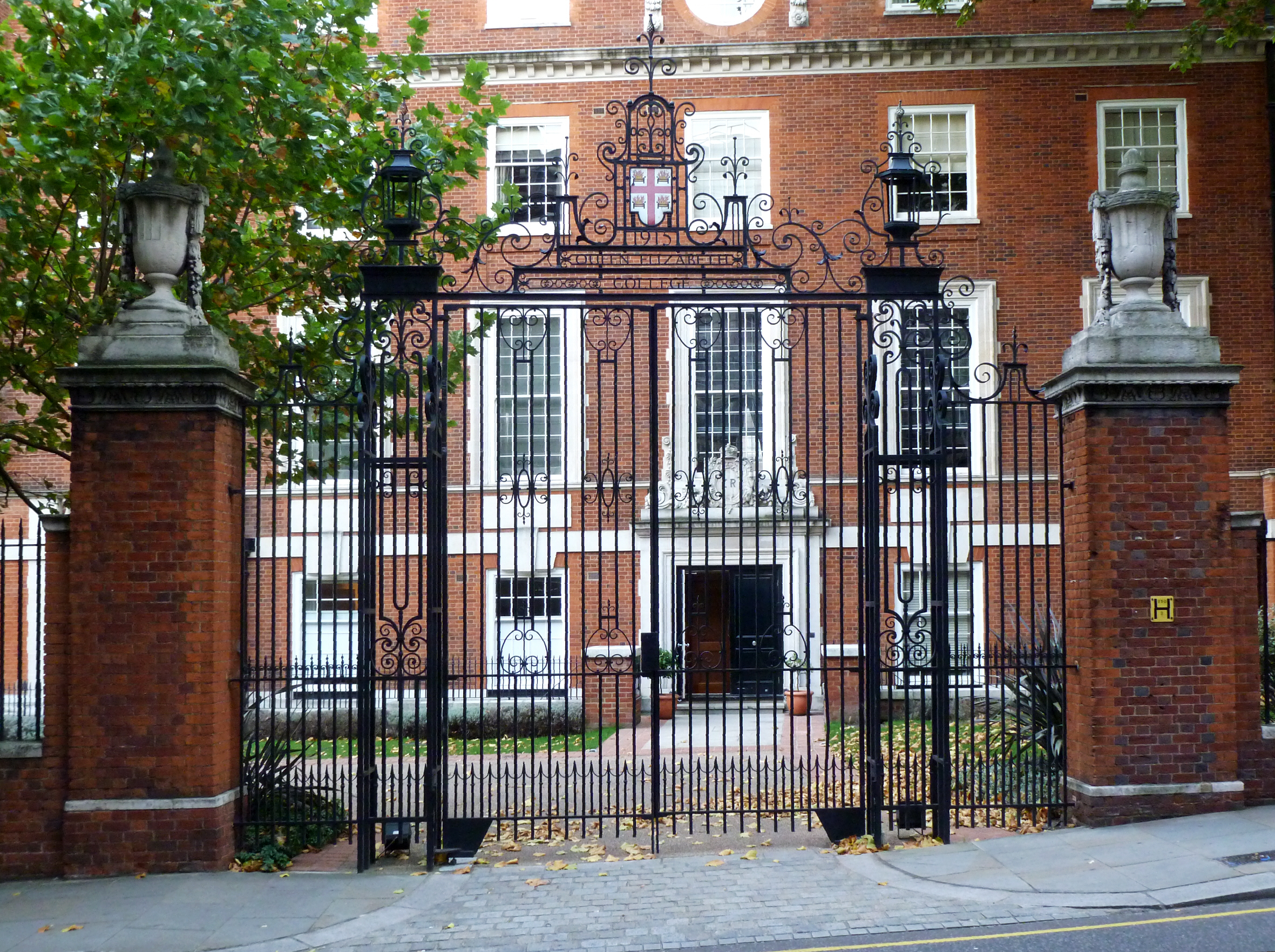
Queen Elizabeth College building in Campden Hill Road, now Academy Gardens

Allen became secretary to the British Association for the Advancement of Science on 1 April 1954, in succession to botanist David Nicoll Lowe. In 1958, Allen was awarded his second honorary LLD by Queen's University Belfast. Upon his retirement from the British Association in 1963, he was awarded a third honorary LLD by the University of Aberdeen. He was succeeded as secretary by the chemist and agriculturalist Norman Wright.

From 1958 Allen also served as chairman of the council of Queen Elizabeth College in the University of London, following on from the 36-year tenure of John Atkins. Allen was made a fellow of the college upon his retirement as chairman in 1964. He was succeeded by the physical chemist Sir Cyril Hinshelwood. In 1969, a lecture hall in the College's extended Atkins Building was named the Allen Theatre in recognition of his work in planning the expansion.

From 1960, Allen had served as vice-chairman of the committee of sponsors for a university in the county of Kent. From its foundation in 1965 until his death in 1970, Allen served as deputy pro-chancellor of the new University of Kent at Canterbury. He also served as the first president of the Kent Postgraduate Medical Centre, founded on 16 May 1964. In 1967 he laid the foundation stone for its building within the precincts of Kent and Canterbury Hospital. On 11 July 1969, the University of Kent awarded Allen his final honorary degree, a Doctorate of Science (DSc).

Allen died on 2 October 1970, at the age of 76, in Canterbury, Kent. In response to the publication of Allen's obituary in The Times, another former prisoner at Changi and Sime Road camps wrote to the editor ascribing his and fellow prisoners' survival and ongoing health to Allen's work in internment.

== Personal life ==
Allen married Sybil Mary Seaton in 1922, with whom he had a son and a daughter. After Sybil's death in 1953, Allen re-married Oriane Frances Tomkins in 1954.

== Notes ==
Academic offices
| Preceded by Hugh Macalister | Principal of King Edward VII College of Medicine; 1930–1947 | Succeeded by Desmond William G. Faris |
| Preceded by James Watson as acting President | President of Raffles College; 1932–1934 | Succeeded by Frederick Joseph Morten |
| Preceded by Wilfred Edward Dyer | Principal of Raffles College; 1947–1949 | Office abolished |
| New institution | Vice-Chancellor of the University of Malaya; 1949–1952 | Succeeded by Sydney Caine |
| Preceded by Sir John Atkins | Chairman of the Council of Queen Elizabeth College; 1958–1964 | Succeeded by Sir Cyril Hinshelwood |
Professional and academic associations
| Preceded by David Nicoll Lowe | Secretary to the British Association for the Advancement of Science; 1954–1963 | Succeeded by Norman Wright |
