= Elizabeth Alexander (scientist) =

British-born radio astronomer

- Born: Frances Elizabeth Somerville Caldwell; 13 December 1908; Merton, Surrey, England
- Died: 15 October 1958 (aged 49); Ibadan, Nigeria
- Education: Newnham College, Cambridge
- Spouse: Norman Alexander (m. 1935)
- Children: 3
- Scientific career
- Fields: Geologist; physicist; radio astronomer

Frances Elizabeth Somerville Alexander (née Caldwell; 13 December 1908 – 15 October 1958) was a British geologist, academic, and physicist, whose wartime work with radar and radio led to early developments in radio astronomy and whose post-war work on the geology of Singapore is considered a significant foundation to contemporary research. Alexander earned her PhD from Newnham College, Cambridge, and worked in Radio Direction Finding at Singapore Naval Base from 1938 to 1941. In January 1941, unable to return to Singapore from New Zealand, she became Head of Operations Research in New Zealand's Radio Development Lab, Wellington. In 1945, Alexander correctly interpreted that anomalous radar signals picked up on Norfolk Island were caused by the sun. This interpretation became pioneering work in the field of radio astronomy, making her one of the first women scientists to work in that field, albeit briefly.

== Early life and studies ==
Alexander was born Frances Elizabeth Somerville Caldwell on 13 December 1908 in Merton, Surrey. She spent some of her early life in India, where her father, Dr. K. S. Caldwell, was a professor at Patna College. (He was later principal of Patna Science College after its founding in 1928). In 1918, Alexander returned to the United Kingdom and began secondary school.

Alexander then attended Newnham College, Cambridge and studied natural science, initially focusing on physics. She was also offered a place at Somerville College, Oxford and Girton College, Cambridge. She graduated with First-class honours in 1931, then received a PhD in geology for a thesis on Aymestry Limestone, under the supervision of Owen Thomas Jones. She was a member of the Sedgwick Club, along with fellow female geologists, Dorothy Hill and Constance Richardson. Like all women graduates of Cambridge University at that time, she could not become a full member of the university until after equal rights were granted post 1945.

In July 1935, Alexander married a physicist, Norman Alexander, from New Zealand. When her husband took the post of Professor of Physics at Raffles College in Singapore, Elizabeth Alexander travelled there and began a study into the effects of weathering in the tropics. She was particularly interested in erosion and how, under certain circumstances, new rock seemed to be forming at unexpectedly high speed. She thus began experiments, burying samples in order to compare them with lab controls later. Whilst in Singapore, the Alexanders had three children, William in 1937, Mary in 1939 and Bernice in 1941.

== Wartime work ==
Between 1940 and 1941, Alexander held the rank of Captain in the Naval Intelligence Service, working on radio direction-finding at Singapore Naval Base.

On 4 January 1942, under Navy orders to take her children to safety and return with specialist equipment being made in Australia, Dr. Alexander and her children were evacuated to New Zealand by a Short S23 C flying boat. After the Fall of Singapore on 15 February, she was stranded in New Zealand. She had no information about her husband for six months, and then was misinformed that he was dead. Whilst in New Zealand, Alexander became Senior Physicist and Head of the Operational Research Section of the Radio Development Laboratory in Wellington in 1942, where she remained until 1945. There she was responsible for most radio and radar research, including pioneering of radio meteorology in conjunction with Washington State College, development of the microwave radar program, and research on anomalous propagation leading to the post-war international project, Project Canterbury. In 1945, Alexander identified the "Norfolk Island Effect" as solar radiation. This discovery marked the beginning of Australian radio-astronomy after she left New Zealand when her contract ended with the end of the war in 1945.

There has been some debate over whether Alexander or Ruby Payne-Scott was actually the first woman to work in the field of radio astronomy. Despite her progress in the field, Alexander only ever considered radio astronomy a job and as soon as the war was over she returned to her passion of geology, never again working in radio astronomy.

Whilst Alexander worked in New Zealand, her husband had continued as Scientific Adviser to the Armed Forces, moving to help out at Singapore General Hospital when Raffles College was on the front line. At the hospital, he kept the X-ray machines going until Singapore fell a few days later. He was then interned in Changi, then Sime Road camps, along with the senior medical staff of the hospital.

== Post-war career ==
In September 1945 Alexander was reunited with her husband in New Zealand when he was allocated six months' compulsory sick leave. He returned to Singapore in March 1946 to restart the Physics and Chemistry Departments at Raffles College. Both departments had been looted and the Professor of Chemistry and his senior lecturer were both dead. Alexander wound up her work in Wellington and took her children to England, leaving them with her sister as guardian. She rejoined Norman Alexander and they bought equipment for the College, then returned to Singapore together.

On returning to Singapore, Alexander acted as registrar for the conversion of Raffles College to the University of Malaya. She sought to restart her work on tropical weathering, however the lab in her house had been destroyed and, during road building, the top of a hill that she had used for triangulation had been removed thus making it impossible to locate her buried experimental samples. Alexander later returned to England whilst Norman Alexander spent time in both Singapore and New Zealand. In 1947, when their children were old enough to attend boarding school, the couple returned to Singapore and both worked at Raffles College.

Alexander became the geologist to the Government of Singapore in 1949, surveying the island and publishing a report in 1950 which included the first geological map of Singapore. For this work, she is credited with having produced one of the most comprehensive papers on the general geology of Singapore. Alexander's main task was to assess the island's quantities of granite and other useful stone, and she concluded that granite resources should last for 500 years. Alexander was also responsible for introducing the name "Murai Schist" to refer to a part of the Jurong Formation, and created the first documented collection of fossils in the area of the Ayer Chawan Facies.

In 1952, the Alexanders moved to Ibadan, Nigeria, both accepting posts at University College Ibadan. Elizabeth Alexander took on the role of Lecturer in Soil Sciences and worked in Agronomy, soil science, and administration. Norman became the Chair of Physics. After the move, a member of staff at Raffles Museum managed to locate one of Alexander's experimental samples of buried rocks, and arranged for it to be sent to Rothamsted Research Station near London so that she could examine it during annual leave. The university opened a department of geology in 1958 and appointed Elizabeth Alexander Senior Lecturer and Head of Department. Just three weeks into her new role, Alexander suffered a stroke and she died a week later on 15 October 1958 at the age of 49.

In 2017 Alexander was selected as one of the Royal Society Te Apārangi's 150 women in 150 words project, celebrating women's contributions to knowledge in New Zealand.

== Bibliography ==
Alexander published a number of geological papers between 1951 and 1957, derived from her PhD, along with some derived from her work as a soil scientist in Nigeria. In 1958 Alexander wrote a report on tropical weathering in Singapore, which was published posthumously.

- Alexander, F. E. S. (1936). "The Aymestry Limestone of the Main Outcrop". Quarterly Journal of the Geological Society. 92 (1–4): 103–115. Bibcode:1936QJGS...92..103A. doi:10.1144/GSL.JGS.1936.092.01-04.07. S2CID 131504090.
- Alexander, F. E. S. (1945). Long Wave Solar Radiation. Department of Scientific and Industrial Research, Radio Development Laboratory.
- Alexander, F. E. S. (1945). Report of the Investigation of the "Norfolk Island Effect". Department of Scientific and Industrial Research, Radio Development Laboratory. Bibcode:1945rdlr.book.....A.
- Alexander, F. E. S. (1946). "The Sun's radio energy". Radio & Electronics. 1 (1): 16–17. (see R&E holdings at NLNZ.)
- Alexander, F. E. S. (1947). "A revision of the genus Pentamerus James Sowerby 1813 and a description of the new species Gypidula bravonium from the Aymestry Limestone of the main outcrop". Quarterly Journal of the Geological Society. 103 (1–4): 143–161. Bibcode:1947QJGS..103..143A. doi:10.1144/GSL.JGS.1947.103.01-04.12. S2CID 128686563.
- Alexander, F. E. S. (1947). "On Dayia navicula (J. de C. Sowerby) and Whitfieldella canalis (J. de C. Sowerby) from the English Silurian". Geological Magazine. 84 (5): 304–316. Bibcode:1947GeoM...84..304A. doi:10.1017/S001675680008300X. S2CID 129866241.
- Alexander, F. E. S. (1948). "A revision of the brachiopod species Anomia Reticularis Linnaeus, genolectotype of Atrypa Dalman". Quarterly Journal of the Geological Society. 104 (1–4): 207–220. Bibcode:1948QJGS..104..207A. doi:10.1144/GSL.JGS.1948.104.01-04.09. S2CID 129746805.
- Alexander, F. E. S. (1950). "The geology of Singapore and the surrounding islands". Report on the Availability of Granite on Singapore and the Surrounding Island. Singapore Government Press.
- Alexander, F. E. S.; Jackson, R. M. (1954). "Examination of soil micro-organisms in their natural environment". Nature. 174 (4433): 750–751. Bibcode:1954Natur.174..750A. doi:10.1038/174750b0. PMID 13214000. S2CID 7199893.
- Alexander, F. E. S.; Jackson, R. M. (1955). "Preparation of sections for study of soil microorganisms". In D. K. McE. Kevan (ed.). Soil Zoology. Proceedings of the University of Nottingham Second Easter School in Agricultural Science. London: Butterworth. pp. 433–441.
- Alexander, F. E. S. (1957). "Differential insecticide damage in maize varieties". Nature. 179 (4550): 109. Bibcode:1957Natur.179..109A. doi:10.1038/179109a0. S2CID 4240429.

== Sources ==
- Orchiston, Wayne (2005). Dr Elizabeth Alexander: First Female Radio Astronomer (PDF). Springer. ISBN 978-1-4020-3723-8.
- Sullivan, Woodruff T. III (2009). Cosmic Noise – A History of Early Radio Astronomy. Cambridge University Press. ISBN 978-0-521-76524-4. Archived from the original on 7 July 2017.
