= Alexander Macalister =

Irish anatomist

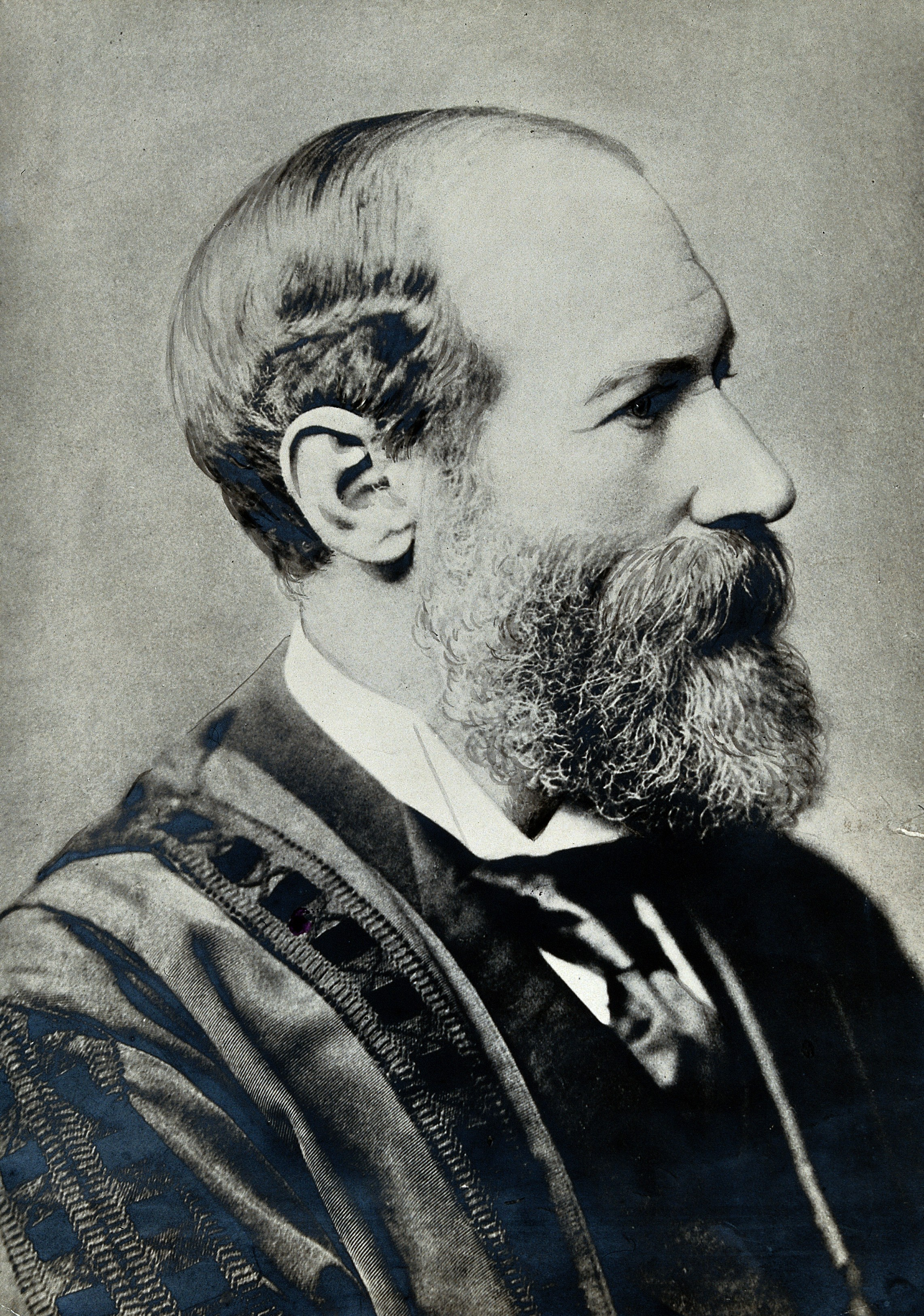

Prof Alexander Macalister FRS Hon.FRSE FSA FRAI (9 April 1844 – 2 September 1919) was an Irish anatomist, Professor of Anatomy, Cambridge University, from 1883 until his death. He was a Fellow of St John’s College, Cambridge.

== Life ==
He was born in Dublin, the second son of Robert Macalister, secretary of the Sunday School Society of Ireland, and his wife (née Boyle). Alexander was educated locally then studied medicine at Trinity College, Dublin.

He qualified at the Irish Royal Colleges in 1861, became M.B. at Trinity College ten years later and M.D. in 1876. After acting as demonstrator of anatomy at the Royal College of Surgeons in Ireland, he was appointed professor of zoology, and eight years later professor of anatomy and chirurgery, at Dublin. In 1883, he succeeded Sir George Murray Humphrey in the chair of anatomy at Cambridge, and held this post for thirty-six years. He was a prolific writer.

Besides his "Text-book of Human Anatomy"(1889) for which he is best known, he was the author of "Introduction to Animal Morphology"(1876) and "Morphology of Vertebrate Animals" (1878) as well as of numerous papers on animal, morphology, human anatomy and small text-books for students. Macalister was also editor of the Journal of Anatomy between 1907 and 1916. He was a man of remarkable versatility, being an able mathematician as well as versed in archæology, Egyptology and draughtsmanship. Like his cousin, Sir Donald Macalister, he was a proficient linguist, having knowledge of fourteen languages.

Macalister received many honours. In 1881, he was elected a fellow of the Royal Society. He was made hon. LL.D. of the Universities of Edinburgh, Glasgow and McGill and hon. D.Sc. and senator of the University of Dublin. He was Secretary of the Royal Irish Academy and president of the Anatomical Society (1897–99). His name has been attached to the fovea gastrica and the annulus femoralis s. cruralis. In 1897, Macalister was named an honorary member of the American Association for Anatomy.

== King Henry VI investigation ==
On 4 November 1910 the body of King Henry VI in its brick vault in St. George's Chapel, Windsor (since 12 August 1484) was "investigated", with King George V's consent, by William Henry St John Hope and Canon John Neale Dalton, in the presence of the Dean and Canons, and various other people such as M.R. James, Provost of King's College, Cambridge (and later of Eton College, both founded by Henry VI), and Dr. A. Macalister, Professor of Anatomy at Cambridge. The vault was emptied of rubble, and at the centre was found a small lead chest containing the fragmented bones of "a fairly strong man, aged between 45 and 55", according to Macalister's report, published in The Times on 12 November 1910. The bones had previously been buried in Chertsey Abbey in 1471 until their removal in 1484.

== Death ==
He died in Cambridge on 2 September 1919 after a long illness and was buried in the Parish of the Ascension Burial Ground in Cambridge with his wife Elizabeth, who had died in 1901.

== Family ==
He married Elizabeth Stewart in 1866. Their children included the archaeologist R. A. Stewart Macalister and George Hugh Kidd Macalister.
