= List of vice-chancellors of the University of Malaya =

This is a list of vice-chancellors of the Universiti Malaya.

No.	Vice-Chancellor	Honour	Qualifications	Term in Office
Before Independence	Sir Dr. George V. Allen	CBE, Kt, LL.D. (Malaya, Belfast and Aberdeen), D.Sc. (Kent)	MD, MB, BCh, BAO (Belfast), DTM&H (Lond.)	1949–1952
Before Independence	Sir Dr. Sydney Caine	KCMG, LL.D. (Malaya)	BSc (LSE)	1952–1956
1	Professor Tan Sri Sir Dr. Alexander Oppenheim	OBE, PMN, KT, LL.D. (Malaya)	PhD (UC), D.Sc. (Oxon)	1956–1965
Acting	Dr. Rayson Huang Li Song	CBE, ORS, JP, D.Sc. (HKU)	D.Phil (Oxon), D.Sc. (Oxon), D.Sc. (Malaya), BSc (HKU)	1965–1966
Acting	Professor Emeritus Tan Sri Datuk Dr. Chin Fung Kee	JMN, PSM, DMPN, D.Sc. (Belfast, Singapore, and Glasgow)	MEng (Belfast), BEng (Civil) (Belfast), Dip. Arts (Raffles College)	1966–1967
2	Dr. James H.E. Griffiths	OBE	PhD (Oxon), MA (Oxon)	1967–1968
3	Regius Professor Dr. Ungku Abdul Aziz bin Ungku Abdul Hamid	Regius Professor (Malaya)	PhD (Waseda), Dip. Arts (Raffles College)	1968–1988
4	Professor Dato' Dr. Syed Hussein Alatas	DSPN	PhD (Amsterdam)	1988–1991
5	Professor Emeritus Datuk Dr. Mohd. Taib Osman	JSM	PhD (Indiana), MA (Malaya), BA (Malaya)	1991–1994
6	Tan Sri Dato' Dr. Abdullah Sanusi Ahmad	PSM, KMN, DSNS	PhD (USC), MA (Pitt) BA (Malaya)	1994–2000
7	Professor Dato' Dr. Anuar Zaini Md. Zain	DPMP	MBBS (Malaya)	2000–2003
8	Professor Emeritus Datuk Dr. Hashim Yaacob	DPSK, SPSK	MSc (Lond.), BDS (Otago)	2003–2006
9	Tan Sri Datuk Dr. Rafiah Salim	PSM, Hon. DUniv (Belfast)	LL.D. (Belfast), LL.M. (Belfast)	2006–2008
10	Tan Sri Datuk Dr. Ghauth Jasmon	PSM, DMSM	PhD (Lond.), BEng (Electrical) (Lond.)	2008–2013
11	Professor Tan Sri Dato' Dr. Mohd. Amin Jalaludin	PSM, DPMS	MBBS (Malaya), FRCS (Royal College of Surgeons of Edinburgh)	2013–2017
12	Datuk Ir. (Dr.) Abdul Rahim Hj. Hashim	PJN, D.Eng (Birmingham)	BEng (Birmingham)	2017–2020
13	Professor Dato' Ir. Dr. Mohd. Hamdi Abd. Shukor	DPNS	D.Eng (Kyoto), MSc (UMIST), BEng (Hons) (Mech) (Imperial)	2020–2023
14	Professor Dato' Seri Ir. Dr. Noor Azuan Abu Osman	DGPN	PhD (Strathclyde), MSc (Strathclyde), BEng (Hons) (Mech) (Bradford)	2023–Present
