= Richard Brunel Hawes =

British physician (1893–1964)

Sir Richard Brunel Hawes CMG FRCP
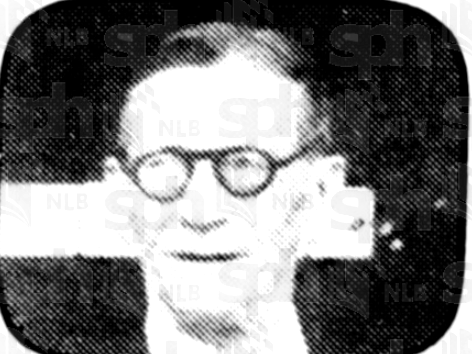
- Hawes in 1954
- Born: 1893; South America
- Died: 30 December 1964 (aged 71)
- Occupations: Physician and expert in tropical medicine
- Children: 3

Sir Richard Brunel Hawes (1893 – 30 December 1964) was a British physician and expert in tropical medicine.

== Early life and education ==
Hawes was born in Iquique, Chile, South America in 1893, the son of Dr Francis Brunel Hawes. He was educated at Stonyhurst College and St Thomas' Hospital, London.

== Career ==
Hawes joined the Royal Engineers in 1914 on the outbreak of World War I, and after returning to St Thomas' Hospital during the following year, served with the Royal Army Medical Corps from 1916 to 1919. He took part in the retreat from Mons and was mentioned in dispatches and awarded the Mons Star. He later served during the Mesopatanium campaign until 1919, and rose to the rank of captain. After the War, he became resident physician at the Old Seaman's Hospital, Greenwich.

In 1921, Hawes joined the Colonial Service and went to Malaya where he practised as a physician in Sungai Petani, Kedah. In 1926, he was appointed the first full-time professor of medicine at the King Edward VII College of Medicine, Singapore, a post he held until 1941. In 1935, he became a Fellow of the Royal College of Physicians. In 1938, he was appointed a member of the government's advisory committee for medical research. He also served as professor of medicine and consulting physician to the government of the Straits Settlements, and physician to Singapore General Hospital, and Tan Tock Seng Hospital.

In 1940, he left Singapore and returned to England where he was consultant physician to the Colonial Office, a post he held until his retirement in 1961.

Hawes made significant contributions to research into Malaria prevention, and the causes of Beriberi and its treatment with vitamin B1. In 1954, he received an honorary MD (Doctor of Medicine) from the University of Malaya.

== Personal life and death ==
Hawes married Kathleen O'Neill in 1920 and they had three sons.

Hawes died on 30 December 1964, aged 71.

== Honours ==
Hawes was appointed Companion of the Order of St Michael and St George (CMG) in the 1949 New Year Honours. He was created a Knight Bachelor in the 1957 Birthday Honours.
