= Sydney Caine =

British economist and educator

Sir Sydney Caine KCMG
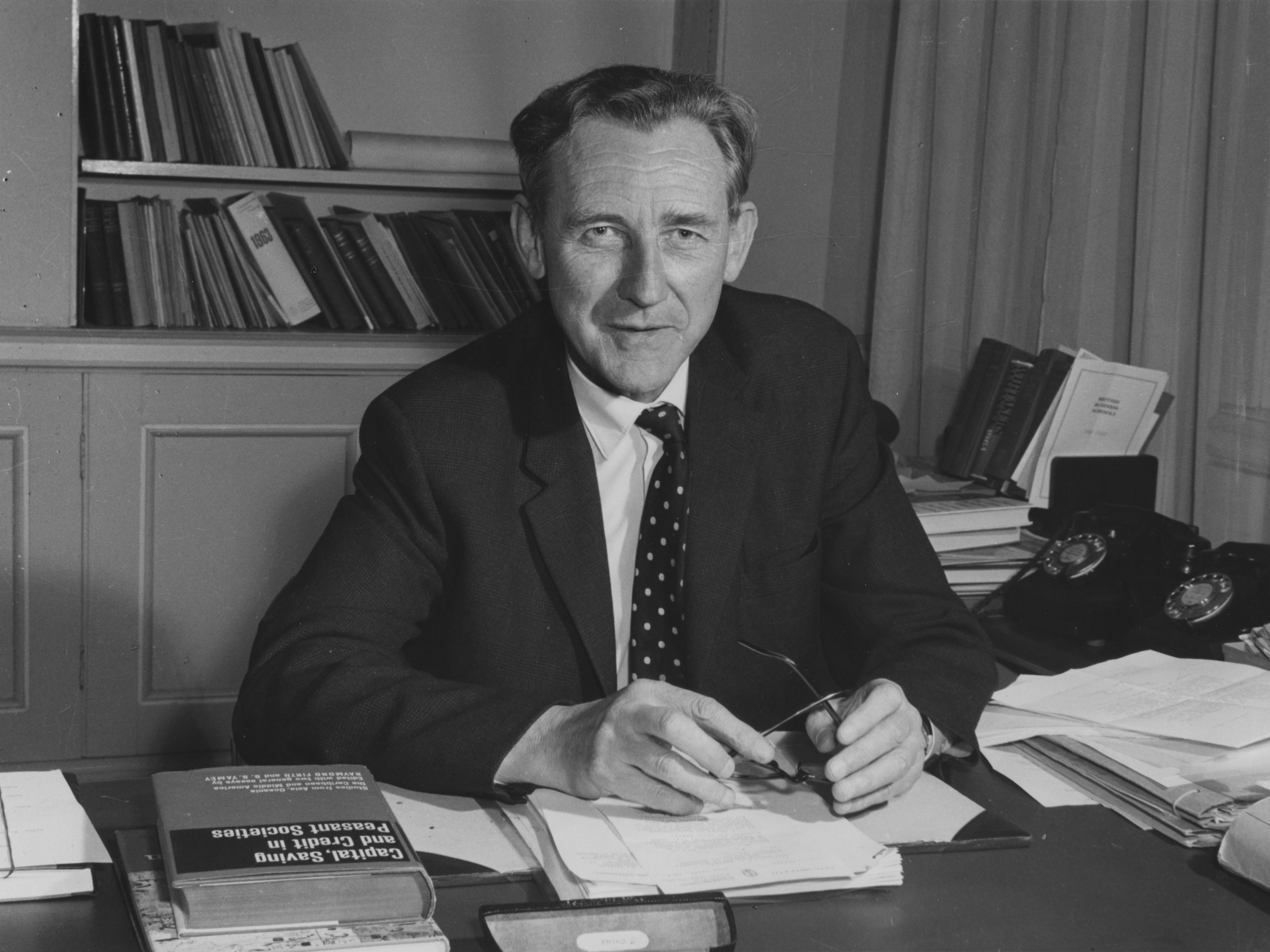
- Caine, circa before 1964

Financial Secretary of Hong Kong
- In office 9 March 1938 – 16 November 1939
- Preceded by: Edwin Taylor
- Succeeded by: Henry R. Butters

Vice-Chancellor of the University of Malaya
- In office 1952–1957
- Preceded by: Sir George Allen
- Succeeded by: Sir Alexander Oppenheim

Director of the London School of Economics
- In office 1957–1967
- Preceded by: Sir Alexander Carr-Saunders
- Succeeded by: Sir Walter Adams

Personal details
- Born: 27 June 1902 Hendon, London, England
- Died: 2 January 1991 (aged 88) Hindhead, Surrey, England
- Spouses: Muriel Harris (m. 1927; died 1962); Doris Winifred (m. 1965; died 1973); Elizabeth Bowyer (m. 1975)
- Children: Michael Harris Caine
- Education: London School of Economics

Sir Sydney Caine KCMG (27 June 1902 – 2 January 1991) was an educator and economist.

== Early life ==
On 27 June 1902, Caine was born. Caine's father was Harry Caine, a railway clerk. Caine's mother was Jane. Caine attended Harrow County School in London, England.

== Education ==
In 1922, Caine graduated with a first class degree, specialising in Economic History from London School of Economics.

== Career ==
Caine started his career as an assistant inspector of taxes. In 1926, Caine joined the Colonial Office, where he served as secretary to the West Indian Sugar Commission and to the UK Sugar Industry Commission.

In 1937, Caine was appointed as the Financial Secretary of Hong Kong, until 1940. He proposed the imposition of a new water charging system amid the construction of the Shing Mun Reservoir, and an income tax.

Between 1952 and 1957 he was the vice-chancellor of the University of Malaya in Singapore.

Caine was appointed the director of the LSE between 1957 and 1967. He was an alumnus of the LSE, and, before his appointment as director of the school, he was a well-known economist who had acted as a consultant for the World Bank for a period of time and had worked as a diplomat, being appointed minister at the British Embassy in Washington, US.

Between 1963 and 1970 he was the chairman of the governing board of the UNESCO International Institute for Educational Planning.

== Personal life ==
In 1925, Caine married Muriel Ann Harris. Their son, Michael, was born in 1927. His wife died in 1962.

Caine married secondly, in 1965, Doris Winifred Folkard (died 1973). He married, thirdly, in 1975, Elizabeth Bowyer (died 1996).

On 2 January 1991, aged 88, Sir Sydney Caine died.

== Legacy ==
- Hong Kong One Dollar note with Caine's printed signature.

Government offices
Preceded by Edwin Taylor as Colonial Treasurer	Financial Secretary of Hong Kong; 1938–1939	Succeeded by Henry Butters
Academic offices
Preceded by Sir George Allen	Vice-Chancellor University of Malaya; 1952–1957	Succeeded by Alexander Oppenheim
Preceded by Sir Alexander Carr-Saunders	Director of the London School of Economics; 1957–1967	Succeeded by Walter Adams
