= Norman Wright =

Norman Wright may refer to:

- Norman Wright (agriculturalist) (1900–1970)
- Norman Wright (footballer) (1908–1974)
- Norman R. Wright & Sons, an Australian shipbuilding company
