= Rudolf Andorka =

Hungarian sociologist (1931–1997)

- Born: 30 April 1931; Budapest, Hungary
- Died: 30 June 1997 (aged 66); Budapest, Hungary
- Awards: Széchenyi Prize (1996); Knight of the Legion of Honour

Academic background
- Education: Eötvös Loránd University

Academic work
- Discipline: Sociology, demography
- Sub-discipline: Social mobility, fertility, social indicators
- Institutions: Hungarian Central Statistical Office; Budapest University of Economic Sciences

Rudolf Andorka (30 April 1931 – 30 June 1997) was a Hungarian sociologist and demographer. After two decades at the Hungarian Central Statistical Office, where he led the country's social mobility surveys, he became professor of sociology at the Budapest University of Economic Sciences, today's Corvinus University of Budapest, in 1984 and served as its rector from 1991 until his death. He was a corresponding member of the Hungarian Academy of Sciences from 1990, president of the National Scientific Research Fund (OTKA) from 1991 to 1996 and president of the Hungarian Sociological Association from 1995 until his death. His textbook Bevezetés a szociológiába (Introduction to Sociology) remains in use at Hungarian universities.

== Early life ==
Andorka was born in Budapest into a Lutheran family. His father, Rudolf Andorka (1891 - 1961), was an army officer who headed Hungarian military intelligence, served as military attaché in Prague and Warsaw and was Hungary's envoy to Spain from 1939 to 1941, resigning when Hungary joined the attack on Yugoslavia. The Germans deported him to the Mauthausen concentration camp in 1944, and the communist authorities interned and later imprisoned him after 1950.

The younger Andorka finished secondary school at the Piarist gymnasium in Budapest in 1949 and enrolled in the evening course of the law faculty of the Pázmány Péter University, while working as a manual labourer because his father's pension had been withdrawn. In 1951 he and his mother were deported to the village of Besenyszög near Szolnok, and he was expelled from the university. After military service and years of work in small cooperatives he was readmitted in 1956. He served in the university national guard during the Hungarian Revolution of 1956, was briefly held by Soviet security officers after its suppression and in 1957 was sentenced to five months in prison. He received his law doctorate in 1963, at the age of 32.

== Career ==
=== Central Statistical Office ===
Unable to practise law, Andorka earned his living as a technical translator from English, German, French, Polish, Spanish and Italian. In 1962, the then-director of the library of the Hungarian Central Statistical Office (KSH), Dezső Dányi, took him on, and in 1963 he moved to the office's Demographic Research Institute. His first assignment was on alcoholism, a topic he later said he was given because it was unpopular.

His book Determinants of Fertility in Advanced Societies was published by Methuen in London and the Free Press in New York in 1978 and was reviewed in Population Studies, Population and Development Review, Contemporary Sociology, The British Journal of Sociology, Social Forces and The Economic Journal. He took the candidate's degree in sociology in 1979 and the Academy's doctorate in 1989.

=== University of Economic Sciences ===
In 1984, Andorka moved to the Budapest University of Economic Sciences as professor and head of the department of sociology. He was elected rector in 1991 and held the post until his death. He was a childhood friend and schoolmate of the prime minister József Antall, but declined Antall's offer of a ministerial post.

== Honours and legacy ==
Andorka received the Széchenyi Prize in 1996 for his work on social mobility and for his services to the organisation of science and to international scientific relations. He was a knight of the French Legion of Honour.

In 1997 his colleagues and students founded the Andorka Rudolf Társadalomtudományi Társaság [Rudolf Andorka Society for Social Sciences], which has organised memorial conferences on his research topics. His library was donated to the Sapientia University in 2013, and the journal Magyar Tudomány devoted a thematic section to his work in 2018. In 2021, the Rajk College for Advanced Studies established a Rudolf Andorka Medal for social scientists.

== Selected works ==
- Alkoholizmus (with László Cseh-Szombathy and György Vukovich). Budapest: Központi Statisztikai Hivatal, 1968.
- Determinants of Fertility in Advanced Societies. London: Methuen, and New York: Free Press, 1978. ISBN 0-416-67340-6.
- A társadalmi mobilitás változásai Magyarországon. Budapest: Gondolat, 1982.
- Bevezetés a szociológiába. Budapest, 1986. Second, revised edition, edited by Zsolt Spéder: Budapest: Osiris, 2006.
- Gyermekszám a fejlett országokban. Budapest: Gondolat, 1987.
- A Society Transformed: Hungary in Time-Space Perspective (edited with Tamás Kolosi, Richard Rose and György Vukovich). Budapest: Central European University Press, 1999.
