= John MacAlister =

Sir John MacAlister
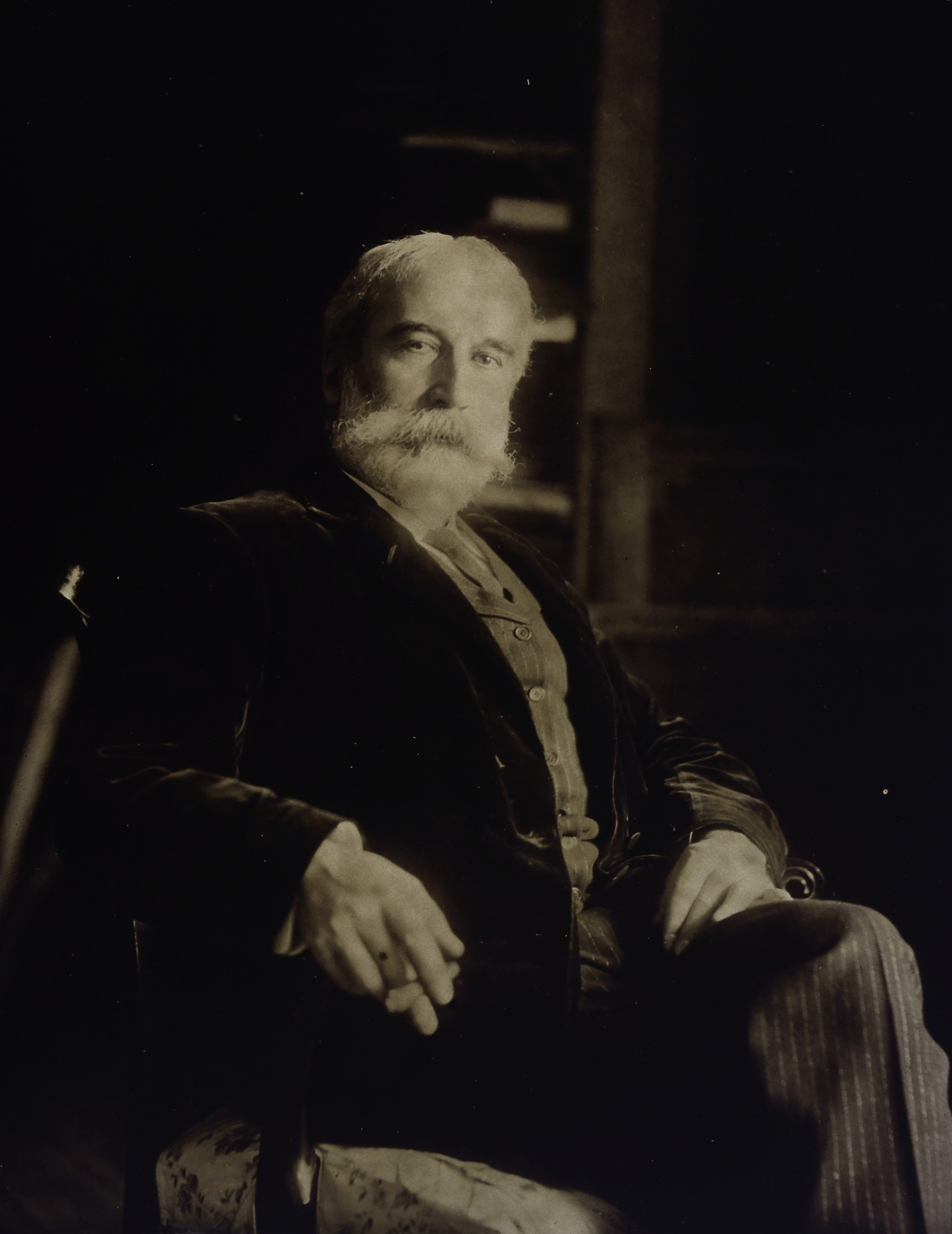
- portrait photo courtesy of Wellcome Trust
- Born: John Young Walker MacAlister; 10 May 1856; Perth, Scotland
- Died: 1 December 1925 (aged 69); London, England
- Citizenship: United Kingdom
- Occupation: Librarian
- Known for: Secretaryship of the Royal Society of Medicine

Sir John Young Walker MacAlister (10 May 1856 – 1 December 1925) was a Scottish journalist, editor, librarian, and promoter of medical postgraduate education. He was the Secretary of the Royal Society of Medicine from 1901 to 1925 and one of the promoters of the Society's formation.

== Education and career ==
John Y. W. MacAlister was educated at the Liverpool Institute High School for Boys and at the University of Edinburgh. He studied medicine for three years at the University of Edinburgh, but ill-health prevented him from completing his medical education. He was a sub-librarian for the Liverpool Library from 1877 to 1880 and a librarian for the Leeds Library from 1880 to 1887.

In 1887, MacAlister was appointed Librarian of the newly founded Gladstone Library of the National Liberal Club. However, after only a few months, he was elected on 9 August 1887, Resident Librarian of the Royal Medical and Chirurgical Society (RMCS) — the forerunner of the RMS. From then on, he devoted most of his time and energy to the RMCS and its successor, the RSM which consisted of the fusion of 18 societies in 1907. In 1901 he had been appointed Secretary of the Society while retaining control of the library as Consultant Librarian.

He worked as a journalist for the Leeds Mercury and the Yorkshire Post. In 1889 he became the founder, owner and editor of the journal The Library. From 1887 to 1889 he was the Honorary Secretary for the Library Association and in 1889 obtained a Royal Charter for the Association.

During WW I, MacAlister was Honorary Secretary of the War Office's Surgical Advisory Committee and also Organiser and Honorary Secretary of the Emergency Surgical Aid Corps for the Admiralty, War Office, and Metropolitan Police. In recognition of his work during WW I, he was knighted in 1919.

== Family ==
John Y. W. Macalister was a brother of Sir Donald MacAlister. John Y. W. Macalister married Elizabeth Batley on 7 January 1875 in Edinburgh. They had two sons; their elder son was Donald Alexander MacAlister.
