= Hugh Macalister =

- Born: 1879
- Died: 1930

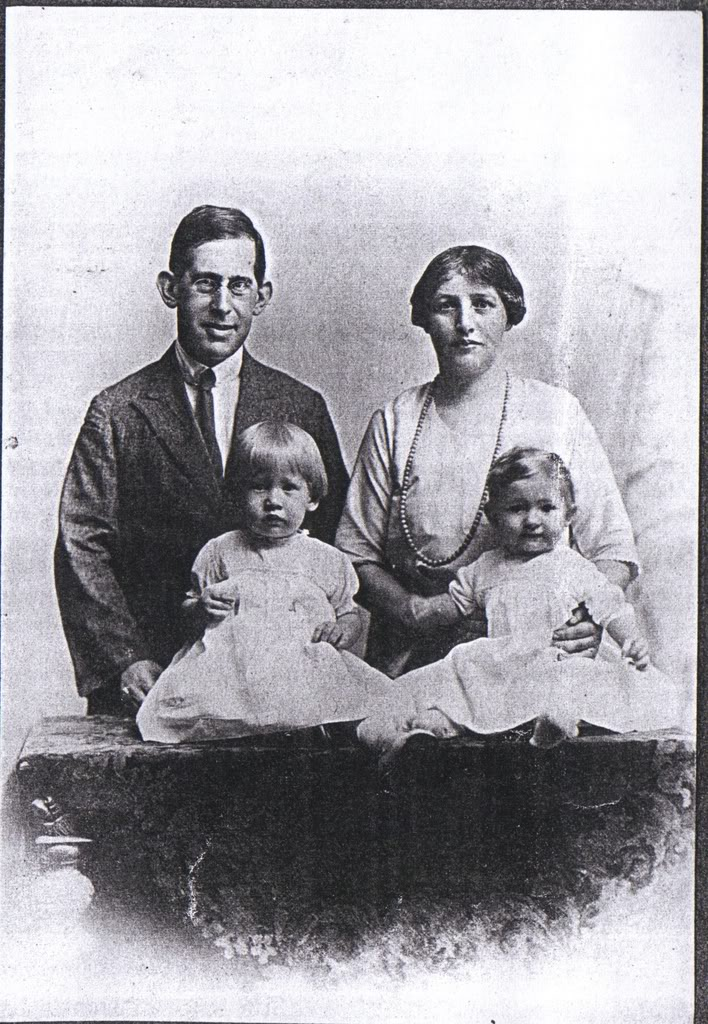
George Hugh Kidd Macalister and Margaret Gray Moir, with their two daughters Elspeth Macalister and Jean Moira Edith Macalister.

George Hugh Kidd Macalister (3 May 1879 – 2 November 1930) was a medical doctor, Professor of Clinical Medicine and Lecturer on Therapeutics, King Edward VII College of Medicine in Singapore, from 1918 until his death.

== Family ==
He was the youngest son of Alexander Macalister, professor of anatomy at Cambridge University. Brother to R.A. Stewart Macalister, Edith Florence Boyle Macalister, Margaret Anne MacDougal Macalister. Widower of Norah O'Brien Tandy (died in childbirth). Husband of Margaret Gray Moir. Margaret and he went on to have two daughters. Elspeth Macalister and Jean Moira Edith Macalister. He was cousin to Donald MacAlister.
