= Edwin Taylor (treasurer) =

Colonial Treasurer of Hong Kong

Edwin Taylor, CMG was a Colonial Treasurer of Hong Kong from 1931 to 1937.

He acted as Acting Colonial Treasurer on 7 May 1931 and Colonial Treasurer on 2 July 1931. He retired on 10 March 1937.

He was awarded Companion of the Order of St Michael and St George (CMG) in the 1936 Birthday Honours for his public service.

Government offices
Preceded by Charles McIlvaine Messer	Colonial Treasurer of Hong Kong; 1931–1937	Succeeded by Sydney Caine as Financial Secretary
