= Population Investigation Committee =

The Population Investigation Committee is a United Kingdom social research group founded in 1936 by the council of the British Eugenics Society.

Its original members included David V. Glass, Griselda Rowntree and J.W.B. Douglas. Since the second world war it has been housed at the London School of Economics (LSE).

The PIC founded a journal, Population Studies and also a Scholarship Fund for UK students studying for master's degrees in demography.

== Formation ==
The origins of the PIC lie in an annual lecture of the Eugenics Society. On 16 February 1935, the Society's Galton Lecture was delivered by Sir Alexander Carr-Saunders, Charles Booth Chair of Social Science at the University of Liverpool, and Chairman of the Eugenics Society's Positive Eugenics Committee. Entitled "Eugenics in the Light of Population Trends", Carr-Saunders's lecture drew attention to the falling birth rate in Britain and his fears for what this meant for British society.

Carr-Saunders argued for a more structured approach to the topic of population and the creation of a "coherent population policy". It was towards these ends that the Council of the Eugenics Society formed a research body – the Population Investigation Committee - in 1936.

At the first meeting of the PIC on 15 June 1936, Carr-Saunders was elected Chairman of the committee, C.P. Blacker the General Secretary, and David Glass the Research Secretary. It was also resolved that the PIC would be an independent organisation to the Eugenics Society (and to other organisations who had appointed representatives to the PIC).

Despite Carr-Saunders original call for a "coherent population policy", the PIC's originating remit was towards research, not in formulating policy. As such, the PIC played a major role in a number of national surveys which sought to investigate the "medical, economic and social factors affecting changes in the population".

== Research ==
The PIC has been involved in a number of social science research projects, the most notable were the National Survey of Health and Development and the Scottish Mental Survey of 1947. The National Survey of Health and Development developed from a Maternity Inquiry established in 1946 through a collaboration of the PIC with the Royal College of Obstetricians and Gynaecologists. The Scottish Mental Survey of 1947 was carried out by the PIC in cooperation with the Scottish Council for Research in Education.

Other research activities of the PIC included inquiries and surveys into fertility and birth control; marriage and divorce and the British Peerage.

== Population Studies ==
The PIC's journal, Population Studies, was established in 1947. It was the first English-language journal "exclusively concerned with demography". Population Studies was also the place of publication for much of the research carried out by the PIC.

== Later years ==
It has been suggested that the research outputs of the PIC slowed down after the death of its then Chairman David Glass in 1978.

The work of the PIC remains centred around Population Studies even if since 2002 the journal has been published externally to the PIC. The PIC also retains interests in the postgraduate teaching of demography - it established a training programme in demography at the LSE in 1965 - and in recent years has maintained a Scholarship Fund (drawn from profits of Population Studies) for the support of UK masters students studying demography.

== Chairmen ==
The Chairmen of the PIC have been:

Sir Alexander Carr-Saunders (1936-1958)

David Glass (1958-1978)

Prof. Ralph Dahrendorf (1978-1984)

Prof. Sir Tony Wrigley (1984-1991)

Prof. John Hobcraft (1991-2003)

Prof. John Cleland (2003- )
