= David Glass (sociologist) =

British sociologist (1911–1978)

David V. Glass FRS FBA
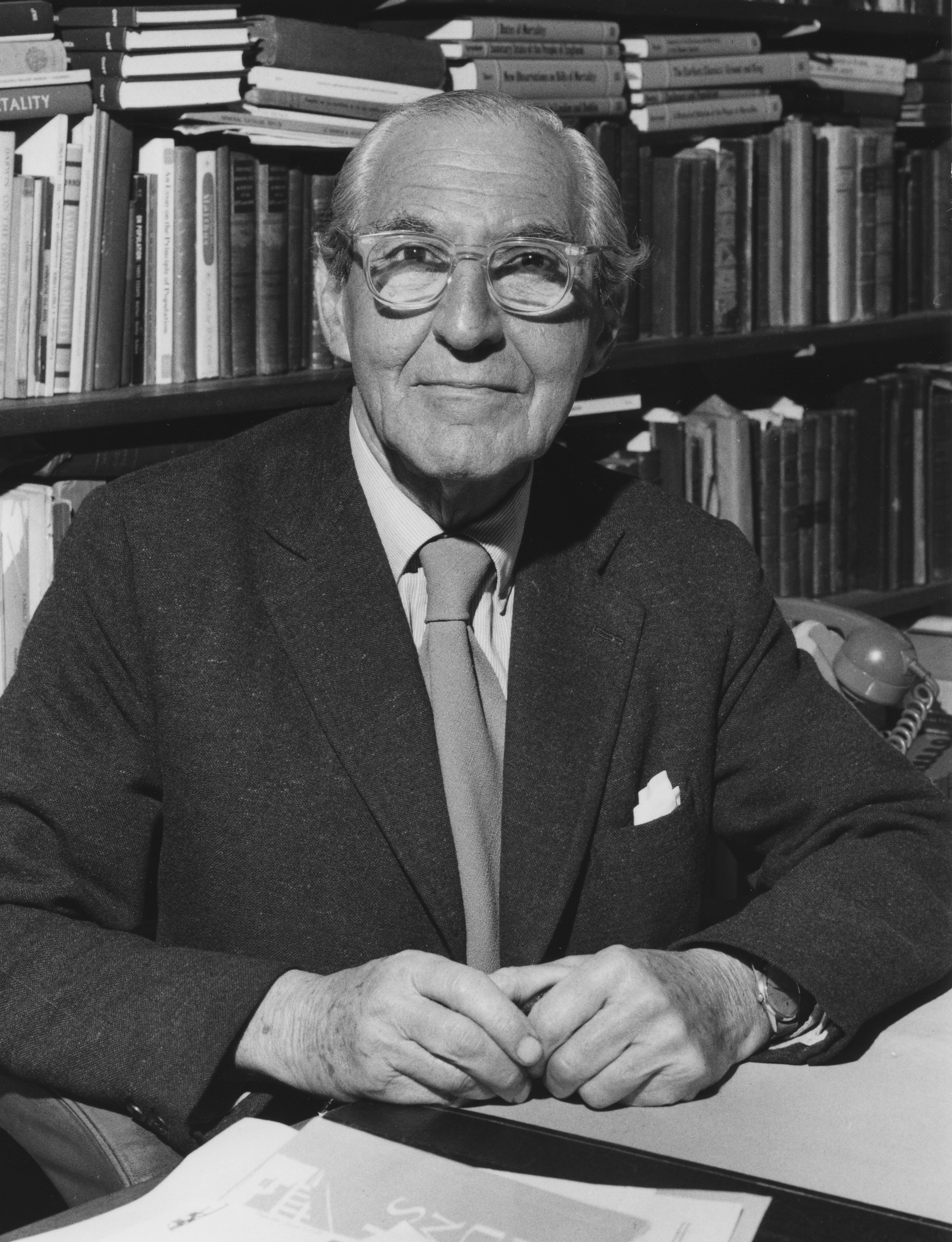
- Glass, c. 1970s
- Born: 2 January 1911; London, England
- Died: 23 September 1978 (aged 67)
- Scientific career
- Fields: Sociology
- Workplaces: London School of Economics
- Doctoral students: Margaret Archer; John Goldthorpe; Orlando Patterson

David Victor Glass FRS FBA (2 January 1911 – 23 September 1978) was an eminent English sociologist and was one of the few sociologists elected to the Royal Society. He is also one of the very few people to be elected both Fellow of the British Academy and Fellow of the Royal Society. He was professor of sociology at the London School of Economics, 1948–1978.

== Life ==
Glass was born in the East End of London, England, the son of a tailor, and attended a state elementary school and Raine's Grammar School. He then took a degree from the LSE in 1931.

From 1932 to 1940 he was a research assistant to William Beveridge and statistician, Arthur Bowley.

In 1935 he was a research assistant with Lancelot Hogben in the department of Social Biology at the LSE. At this time he came into contact with R. R. Kuczynski. After Hogben's departure and the closing of the department in 1937, he was heavily involved in founding the Population Investigation Committee (PIC).

In 1948 he became professor. and from 1961 to 1978 he was Martin White Professor of Sociology at the London School of Economics. Glass was succeeded in the role by Donald Gunn MacRae.

He died in 1978 from a coronary thrombosis and was survived by his wife Ruth Glass, the urban sociologist.

== Positions held ==
- Chairman, Population Investigation Committee
- President, British Society for Population Studies
- Honorary President, International Union for Scientific Study of Population
- Member, International Statistical Institute
- FBA, 1964
- FRS, 1971
- Foreign Honorary Member, American Academy of Arts and Sciences, 1971
- Foreign Associate, National Academy of Sciences (USA), 1973

== Publications ==
- The Town in a Changing World, 1935
- The Struggle for Population, 1936
- Population Policies and Movements in Europe, 1940
- (ed) Introduction to Malthus, 1953
- (ed) Social Mobility in Britain, 1954
- (with Eugene Grebenik) The Trend and Pattern of Fertility in Great Britain, 1954
- (ed) The University Teaching of Social Sciences: Demography, 1957
- Latin American Seminar on Population: Report, 1958
- Society: Approaches and Problems for Study, 1962 (co-ed)
- Differential Fertility, Ability and Educational Objectives, 1962
- (ed jtly), Population in History, 1965
- (ed jtly) Population and Social Change, 1972
- Numbering the People, 1973
- (with P. Taylor) Population and Emigration, 1976

He was an editor of the journals Population Studies and British Journal of Sociology.

== See also ==
- Who's Who (UK)
