= Geology of Singapore =

Igneous rocks are found in Bukit Timah, Woodlands, and Pulau Ubin island. Granite makes up the bulk of the igneous rock. Gabbro is also found in the area and is found in an area called Little Guilin, named for its resemblance to Guilin in South China. This area is in Bukit Gombak. Sedimentary rocks are found on the western part of Singapore, which is mainly made of sandstone and mudstones. It also includes the southwestern area. Metamorphic rocks are found in the northeastern part of Singapore, and also on Pulau Tekong, off the east coast of Singapore. The rocks are mainly made up of quartzite, and also make up the Sajahat Formation.

== Specific areas ==
The following are the list of local geology:

- Kallang Formation:
  Reef Member: Coral, unconsolidated calcareous sand and lesser quartz, ferruginous and lithic sand.
  Transitional Member: Unconsolidated black to blue-grey estuarine mud, muddy sand or sand, often with a higher organic content and peat layers.
  Littoral Member: Well sorted unconsolidated beach and near-shore quartz sand with minor lateritic, shell and lithic fragments. Iron-cemented beach rock is also included in this member.
  Alluvial Member: A variable terrestrial sediment ranging from pebble beds through sand, muddy sand, and clay to peat. The member is usually unconsolidated but lightly consolidated beds may be found.
  Marine Member: Dominantly a blue-grey clayey mud but peat and sand horizons are also present. The member is usually unconsolidated but lightly consolidated beds do occur.
- Tekong Formation: Unconsolidated marine and littoral well sorted sand with minor pebble beds and wood.
- Huat Choe Formation: A lacustrine deposit containing white kaolin clay and minor quartz gravel.
- Old Alluvium: Terrestrial to deltaic loose coarse quartz-feldspar sand and gravel, and lightly cemented sandstone-conglomerate. The top 8 metres are usually deeply weathered.
- Fort Canning Boulder Bed: Pleistocene colluvial deposit of strata from Rimau and possibly Queenstown Facies
- Jurong Formation:
  Murai Schist: Strongly cleaved and sheared sediment of the Jurong Formation. Results from dynamic metamorphism.
  Tengah Facies: Muddy marine sandstone with occasional grit beds and conglomerate. The member is usually deeply weathered but appears not to have been strongly lithified at any stage.
  St. John Facies: Flysch-like marine muddy fine sandstone with minor laminae of carbonaceous matter. Usually moderately well lithified.
  Rimau Facies: Transitional to marine quartz conglomerate and quartz sandstone. The clasts and usually angular to sub-angular and loosely packed but the rock is well cemented.
  Pandan Facies: Grey to dark grey fossiliferous limestone, carbonaceous limestone, micritic limestone, and sparitic limestone. Minor dolomite and marble.
  Ayer Chawan Facies: Well bedded marine muddy sandstone and mudstone, often black. Red roundstone conglomerate is common and all beds are tuffaceous. Lithic tuff and spilite are mapped separately. A number of fossil collections have been made from this member.
  Jong Facies: Well cemented sandstone conglomerate and sandstone with occasional mudstone beds and spilite pillows.
  Queenstown Facies: Red to purple mudstone and sandstone with minor conglomerate. Minor tuffs can also be found within the member. The red colouration is thought to come from tropic weathering in Triassic time, but volcanic material present may also have added to the colour.
- Dyke Rocks: Igneous rocks intruded into the Palaeozoic Formations and Bukit Timah Granite. Dykes are grouped as Acid Dykes and Basic Dykes. Within the acid dykes granophyre, trachyte, and granite porphyry, and within the basic dykes, dolerite, and spessartine have been mapped.
- Bukit Timah Granite: The granite varies from granite through adamellite to granodiorite, and several hybrid rocks are included within the formation. Both hornblende-rich granite and biotite-rich granite occur. Zones of norite-granite mixed rocks are also seen. Hybrid granodiorite is also recognised.
- Palaeozoic Volcanics: Andesitic ashy tuff and agglomerate tuff.
- Gombak Norite: Gabbroic and noritic rock. Shows metasomatic formation close to the Bukit Timah Granite.
- Sajahat Formation: Well lithified quartzite, quartz sandstone, and argillite.

== See also ==
- Geography of Singapore
