= Population Studies (journal) =

Academic journal

- Discipline: Demography
- Language: English
- Edited by: John Ermisch

Publication details
- History: 1947–present
- Publisher: Taylor & Francis
- Frequency: 3 issues/year
- Impact factor: 1.702 (2018)

Standard abbreviations
- ISO 4: Popul. Stud. (Camb.)

Indexing
- CODEN: POSTA4
- ISSN: 0032-4728 (print); 1477-4747 (web)
- LCCN: sn98023299
- OCLC no.: 1027933877

Links
- Journal homepage; Online access; Online archive

Population Studies is a triannual peer-reviewed academic journal covering demography. It was established in 1947 and is published by Taylor & Francis on behalf of the Population Investigation Committee. The founding editor-in-chief was David Glass, who edited the journal from 1947 until his death in 1978. The current editor-in-chief is John Ermisch (University of Oxford). According to the Journal Citation Reports, the journal has a 2018 impact factor of 1.702, ranking it 19th out of 29 journals in the category "Demography".

== Past Editors ==
- 2017- John Ermisch (University of Oxford)
- 1997-2016 John Simons (London School of Hygiene and Tropical Medicine)
- 1978-1996 Eugene Grebenik (Office of Population Censuses and Surveys)
- 1947-1978 David Glass (sociologist) (London School of Economics)
