= Michael Harris Caine =

English businessman and philanthropist (1927–1999)

Sir Michael Harris Caine
- Alfred Ayer, Iris Murdoch and Caine (on right), in 1978
- Born: 17 June 1927; Welwyn Garden City, England
- Died: 20 March 1999 (aged 71); London, England
- Education: Bedales School: University of Oxford; George Washington University
- Occupations: Businessman and philanthropist
- Known for: Co-founding the Booker Prize, creating the Caine Prize for African Writing
- Spouses: Janice Mercer (m. 1952; div. 1987) Emma Nicholson (m. 1987)
- Children: 3
- Parent: Sydney Caine (father)

Sir Michael Harris Caine (17 June 1927 – 20 March 1999) was an English businessman. He headed Booker Bros and Booker plc, the food wholesalers. His philanthropic activities included co-founding the Man Booker Prize, creating the Caine Prize and the Russian Booker Prize, and serving as president of the Royal African Society.

== Early life and education ==
Michael Harris Caine was born in Welwyn Garden City on 17 June 1927, the son of economist Sydney Caine, who was later Financial Secretary of Hong Kong and director of the London School of Economics.

Caine attended Bedales, an independent school notable for its progressive ethos. He studied at the University of Oxford, receiving his bachelor's degree after writing on slavery and secession in the United States. He received his master's degree at George Washington University.

== Career ==
Caine joined Booker plc in 1952 as a management trainee. He rose quickly through the ranks, and he joined the board in 1964. In 1975, he became chief executive, and four years later, he also assumed the chairmanship. He held the post of chief executive until 1984 and of chairman until 1993, the year he retired.

He helped establish the Man Booker Prize for literary fiction in 1969, using the Prix Goncourt as a model. He chaired the Booker Prize Management Committee from 1972 to 1995. He also launched the Russian Booker Prize, awarded from 1992 to 2017.

Caine headed and maintained several Africa-focused organizations and initiatives, including the Royal African Society, London's Africa Centre (for which he chaired the council of management from 1995), the African Emerging Markets Fund, Africa '95 (chairing the executive committee) and the United Kingdom Council for Overseas Students. For his philanthropic work he was knighted in 1988.

== Personal life ==
With his first wife, Janice Mercer, whom he married in 1952, he had one son and one daughter; the couple divorced in 1987. Later that year, Caine married the politician and philanthropist Emma Nicholson. Together they had a foster son, Amar Kanim, who was rescued from Iraq after surviving a napalm attack during the 1991 uprisings there.

Caine was frequently confused with the actor Michael Caine; Baroness Nicholson said that this happened "an enormous number of times. The phone would ring in the middle of the night, and there would be these inebriated women calling from Los Angeles saying, 'I'm coming over, I'm on the next plane, get my room ready.'"

=== Death ===
On 8 January 1999, Caine underwent an operation for colorectal cancer at the private King Edward VII's Hospital in London. On 7 February, during his recovery, his breathing tube became blocked. Nurses were at first unable to repair it, and he fell into a coma due to the loss of oxygen to his brain. On 18 March, he was transferred to St Thomas' Hospital, where he died two days later, at the age of 71. It was ruled a death by misadventure. His widow, Baroness Nicholson, believed his death was the result of poor hospital standards, and subsequently called for increased oversight in private hospitals. An intensive care doctor interviewed for a Panorama special about the incident said that the staff of an NHS hospital may have been better prepared to care for Caine.
