= Donald Gunn MacRae =

British sociologist (1921–1997)

- Born: 20 April 1921; Glasgow, Scotland
- Died: 23 December 1997 (aged 76); Canterbury, Kent, England
- Education: University of Glasgow; Balliol College, Oxford
- Occupation: Sociologist
- Employer: London School of Economics

Donald Gunn MacRae (20 April 1921 – 23 December 1997) was a British sociologist.

== Biography ==
MacRae was born in Glasgow, Scotland, on 20 April 1921, and raised there and on the Isle of Skye, where his grandparents lived. His father Donald MacRae was an engineer who worked for a flour mill, and his mother Elizabeth Maud (Gunn) MacRae was a teacher.

MacRae attended the University of Glasgow, followed by the Balliol College, Oxford. Upon attaining first-class honours in philosophy, politics and economics, he joined the London School of Economics faculty in 1945, as an assistant lecturer. He was promoted to lecturer in 1950, and appointed reader in 1954. MacRae made professor in 1961, and was named Martin White Professor of Sociology in 1978, succeeding David Glass. Upon retirement in 1987, MacRae gained emeritus status.

MacRae was married twice, first to Helen McHardy in 1948. They had two daughters before the marriage was dissolved. In 1987, MacRae married Jean Ridyard, with whom he raised one daughter and one son. MacRae died on 23 December 1997, in Canterbury, Kent.
