= Donald MacAlister =

Scottish physician

Sir Donald MacAlister, Bt
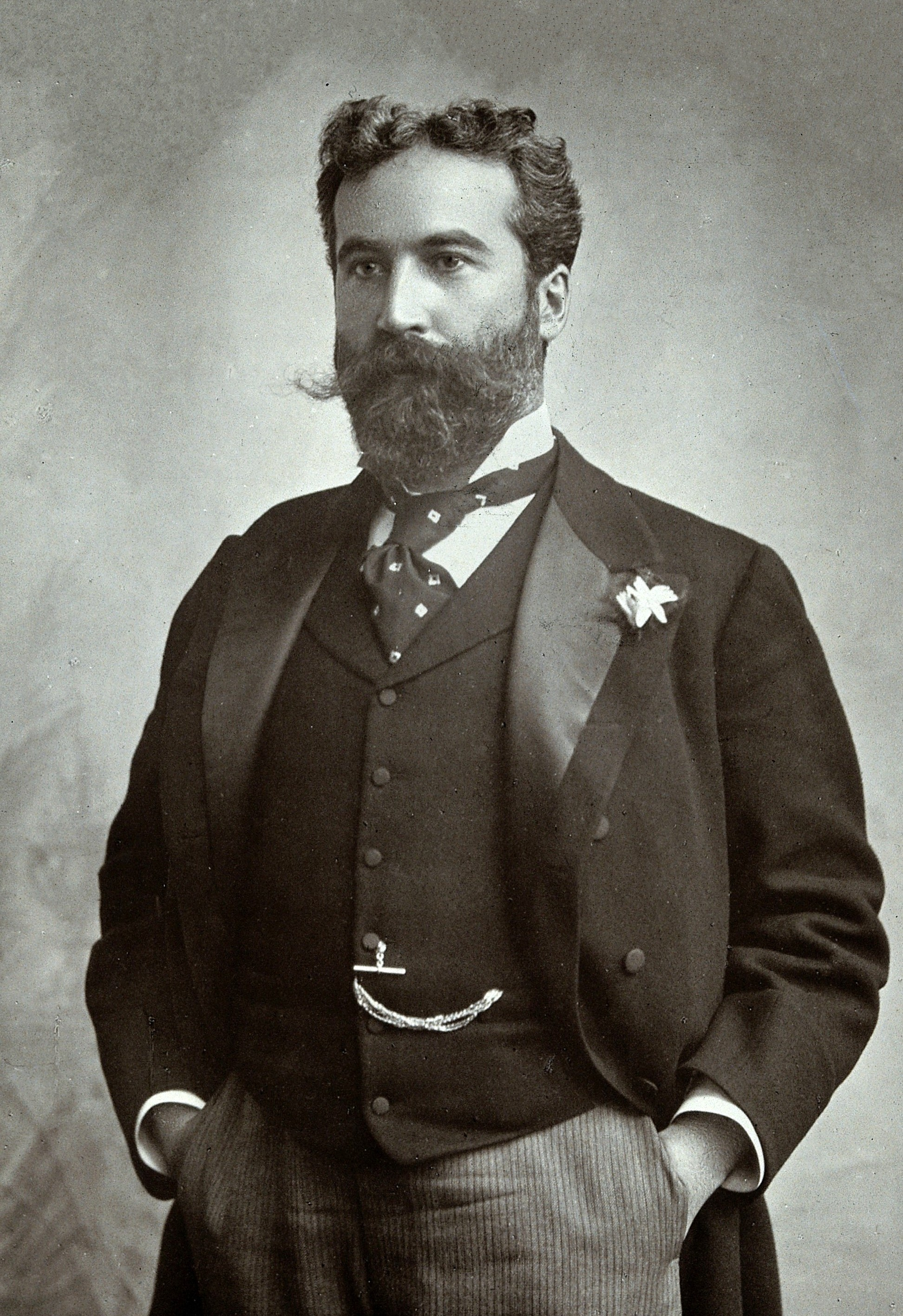

Chancellor of the University of Glasgow
- In office 1907–1929

Personal details
- Born: 17 May 1854 Perth, Perthshire, Scotland
- Died: 15 January 1934 (aged 79)
- Education: St John's College, Cambridge
- Profession: Physician

Sir Donald MacAlister, 1st Baronet of Tarbet KCB FRSE (17 May 1854 – 15 January 1934) was a Scottish physician who was Principal and Vice-Chancellor and, later, Chancellor of the University of Glasgow. He was a member of the Cambridge Apostles intellectual secret society, from 1876. From 1904 to 1931 he was President of the General Medical Council.

== Early life ==
Donald MacAlister was born in Perth, on 17 May 1854, the son of Daniel MacAlister (also spelt MacAllister), a publisher's agent and book-deliverer, living at 2 Earls Dykes in Perth who later went to live in Liverpool to work for Blackie and Son. His mother was Euphemia Kennedy and his younger brother, born in 1856, was Sir John MacAlister. He was cousin to Hugh Macalister.

He rose in life from humble beginnings via school at the Liverpool Institute for Boys (founded 1825, closed 1985) to achieve the highest score in the final mathematics examinations at the University of Cambridge in 1877. In November 1877, he was elected a Fellow of St. John's College, Cambridge.

He was a native speaker of Gaelic.

== Academic career and later life ==
MacAlister remained a fellow of St. John's College until the end of his life, and was senior tutor from 1900 to 1904. In 1879, he published a paper in the Proceedings of the Royal Society on "The Law of the Geometric Mean." The work was in response to a question put by Francis Galton and contains what is now called the log-normal distribution and the definitions of lower and higher quartiles to go along the then-called “middlemost” (median).

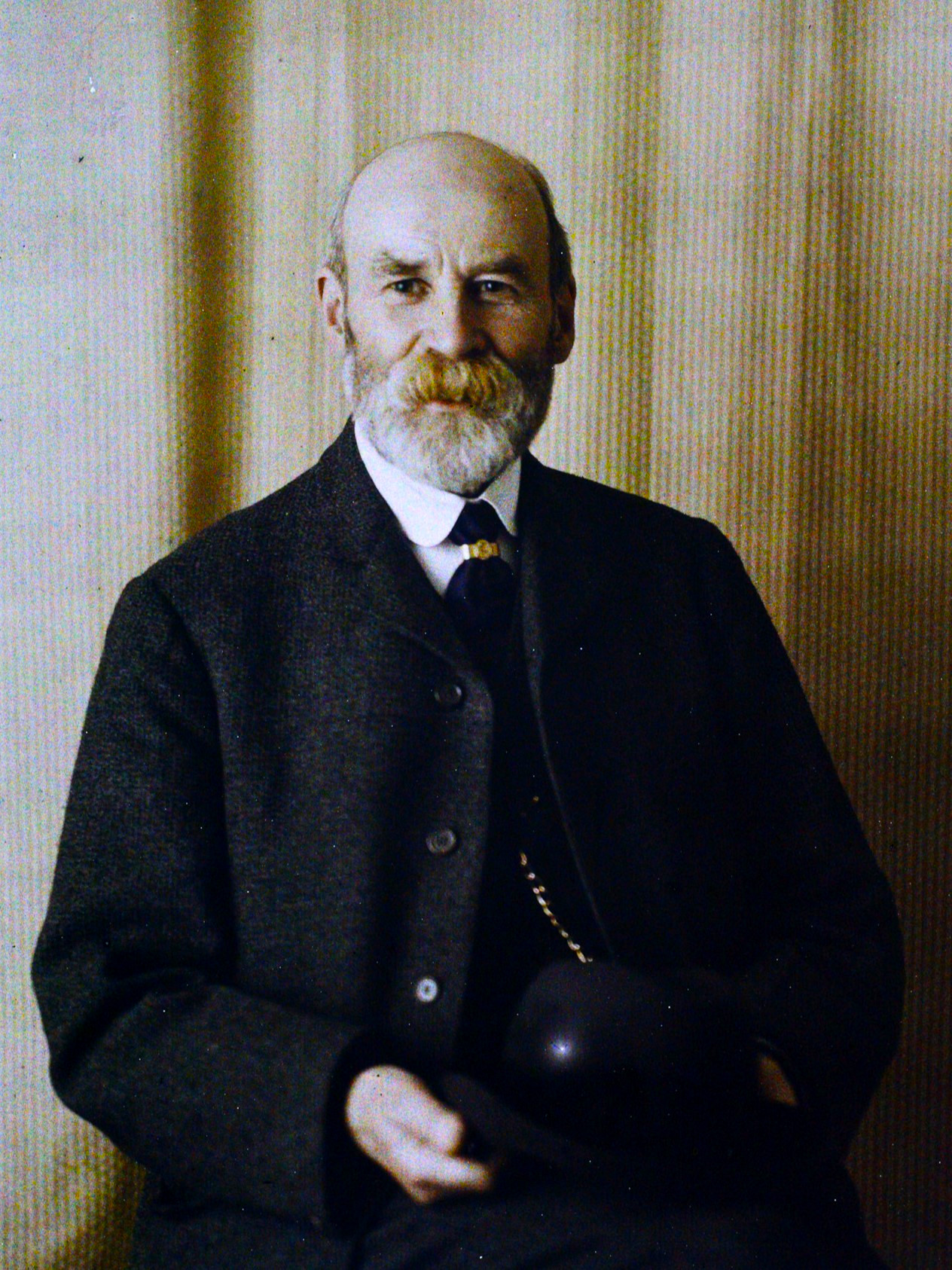
1919 Autochrome by Auguste Léon

After a spell teaching mathematics at Harrow School, MacAlister returned to his original intention of studying medicine, first at Cambridge, later in 1879 at St. Bartholomew's Hospital, and for a short time at Leipzig. In 1881, he settled in Cambridge, and took up medical teaching, investigation, and practice, and in 1884, when he graduated M.D., became a physician at Addenbrooke's Hospital. He was elected Fellow of the Royal College of Physicians in 1886. He was the Gulstonian Lecturer in 1887.

In addition to his accomplishments in mathematics and medicine, MacAlister was also a proficient linguist. In addition to his native Gaelic and English, he was said to have spoken German, Norse, French, Italian, Dutch, Spanish, Portuguese, Czech, Basque, Turkish, Greek, Arabic, Swedish, Russian, Serbian, Afrikaans and Romany: nineteen languages total.

MacAlister was a contemporary at St. John's of the first Japanese graduate of Cambridge named Kikuchi Dairoku and they were lifelong friends. MacAlister also assisted Inagaki Manjiro with a petition to the Council of the Senate to allow Japanese students to obtain exemption from the study of Latin and Greek for entrance examinations.

MacAlister played a very important part in the work of the General Medical Council (GMC). He was elected to it in 1889 as representative of Cambridge University and became its president in 1904. In 1931, after an unbroken twenty-seven years in office, he stood down on grounds of ill health.

In 1907, MacAlister was appointed Principal of the University of Glasgow, in place of Very Rev Robert Herbert Story, a position from which he retired in 1929. During those years, the university grew substantially. Upon his resignation, he was elected Chancellor of the university by the General Council.

MacAlister took a leading part in the university business of the country. He was one of the founders of the Universities Bureau of the British Empire, and was for many years Chairman of the Standing Committee of Vice-Chancellors and Principals of the British universities.

MacAlister's work was widely recognised; he received honorary doctorates from thirteen universities and was appointed KCB in 1908 and created a baronet, of Tarbert, Cantire, in the County of Argyll, in 1924.

In 1917, he was elected a Fellow of the Royal Society of Edinburgh. His proposers were Ralph Allan Sampson, Frederick Orpen Bower, John Horne, and Thomas James Jehu.

He died in 1934 and is buried in the Parish of the Ascension Burial Ground in Cambridge, with his wife, Edith Florence Boyle (16 June 1873 – 27 November 1950). They had no children and the baronetcy became extinct upon his death.

== Works ==
- Introductory Address on the General Medical Council (lecture, 1906)

== See also ==
- Japanese students in Britain

Academic offices
| Preceded by Professor Robert Story | Principal and Vice-Chancellor of the University of Glasgow; 1909 to 1929 | Succeeded by Professor Sir Robert Sangster Rait |
| Preceded by The Earl of Rosebery | Chancellor of the University of Glasgow; 1929 to 1934 | Succeeded by Sir Daniel Macaulay Stevenson |
Baronetage of the United Kingdom
| New creation | Baronet (of Tarbert); 1924–1934 | Extinct |
