= R. A. Stewart Macalister =

Irish archaeologist (1870–1950)

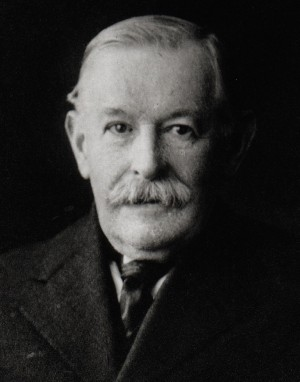
- Born: Robert Alexander Stewart Macalister; 8 July 1870; Dublin, Ireland
- Died: 26 April 1950 (aged 79); Cambridge, England
- Education: The Perse School
- Alma mater: St John's College, Cambridge
- Occupation: Archaeologist

Robert Alexander Stewart Macalister (8 July 1870 – 26 April 1950) was an Irish archaeologist.

== Biography ==
Macalister was born in Dublin, Ireland, the son of Alexander Macalister, then Professor of Zoology, University of Dublin. His father was appointed professor of anatomy at Cambridge University in 1883, and he was educated at The Perse School and then at St John's College, Cambridge, where in 1892 he graduated as fourteenth junior optime in mathematics.

Although his earliest interest was in the archaeology of Ireland, he soon developed a strong interest in biblical archaeology. Along with Frederick J. Bliss, he excavated several towns in the Shephelah region of Ottoman Palestine from 1898 to 1900. Using advances in stratigraphy building on the work of Flinders Petrie, they developed a chronology for the region using ceramic typology. Upon Bliss' retirement, Macalister became director of excavations for the Palestine Exploration Fund (PEF) in 1901.

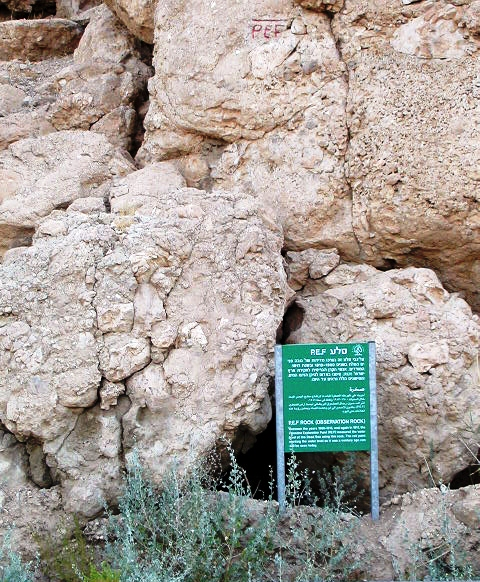
Line painted in 1900 (at top of image, marked "PEF") by Robert A.S. Macalister showing the level of the Dead Sea.

From 1902 to 1909 he was responsible for the excavations at Gezer, in the modern state of Israel, just west of Jerusalem. This was one of the earliest large-scale scientific archaeological excavations in the region. The Gezer calendar found there is a very early paleo-Hebrew calendrical inscription. Macalister also documents his findings of child sacrifices around the High Place of Gezer, by the Amorites, a tribe of Canaan. He associates his findings with biblical records of the sins of the Amorites, which he calls "the iniquity of the Amorites" in his 1906 publication "Bible side-lights from the mound of Gezer".

Macalister left the field of Biblical archaeology in 1909 to accept a position as professor of Celtic archaeology at University College Dublin, where he taught until his retirement in 1943. During this period, he worked at the ancient Irish royal site at the Hill of Tara and was responsible for editing the catalogue of all known ogham inscriptions from Great Britain and Ireland. Many of his translations of Irish myths and legends are still widely used today. He was elected to the Royal Irish Academy in 1910 and served as their president from 1926 to 1931. He was also president of the Royal Society of Antiquaries of Ireland from 1924 to 1928.

He is buried at the Parish of the Ascension Burial Ground in Cambridge, with his sister Margaret A. M. Macalister.

== Gallery ==
From "Bible Side Lights from Gezer".

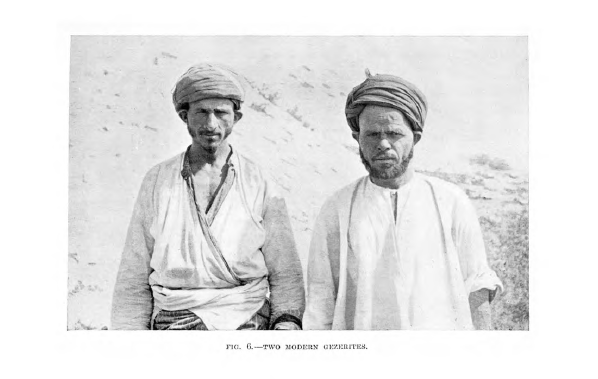

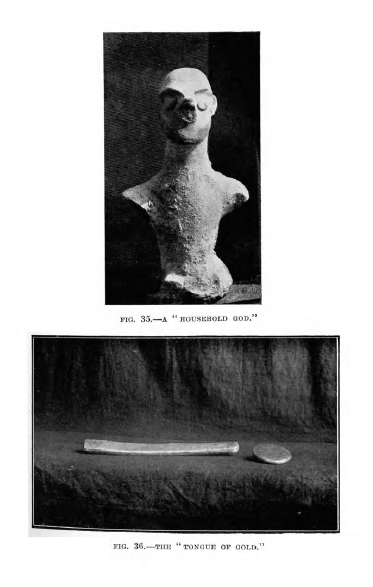

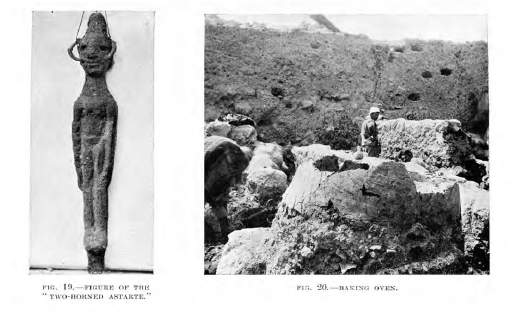

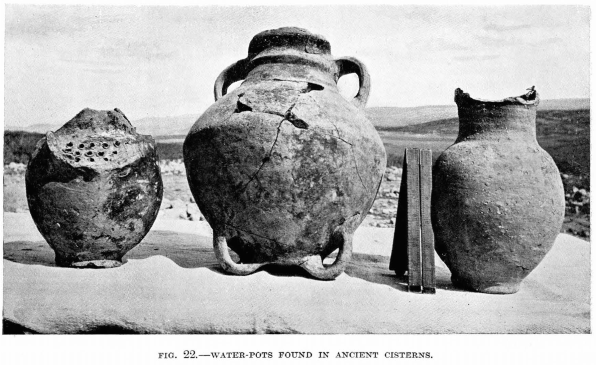

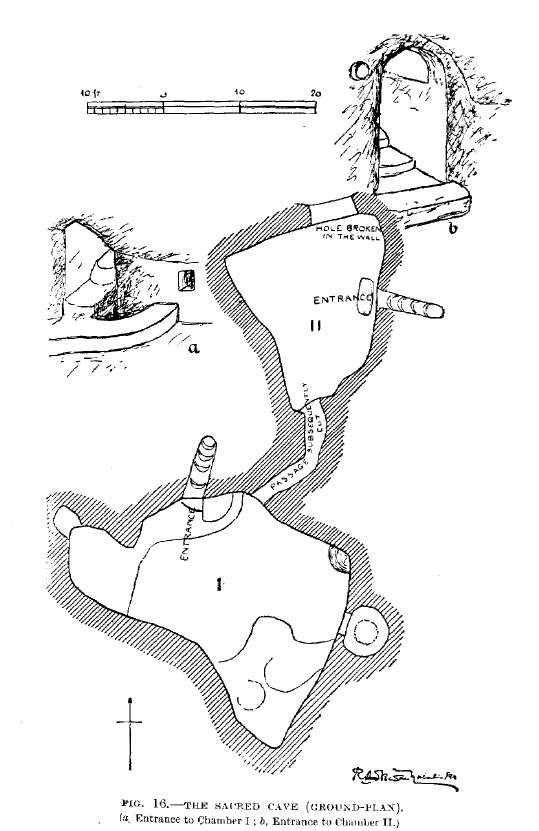

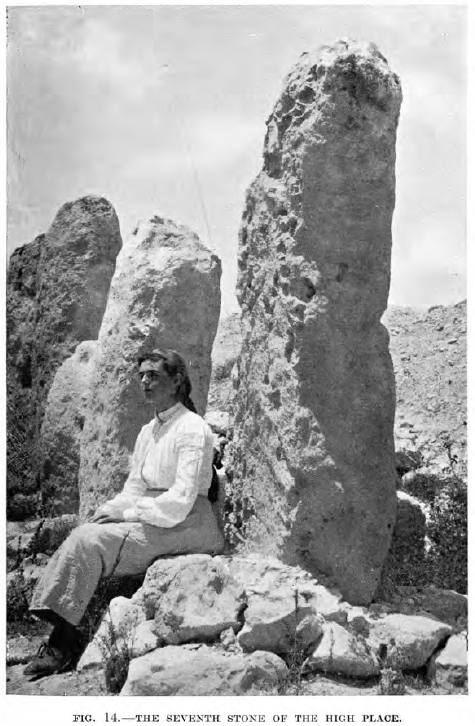

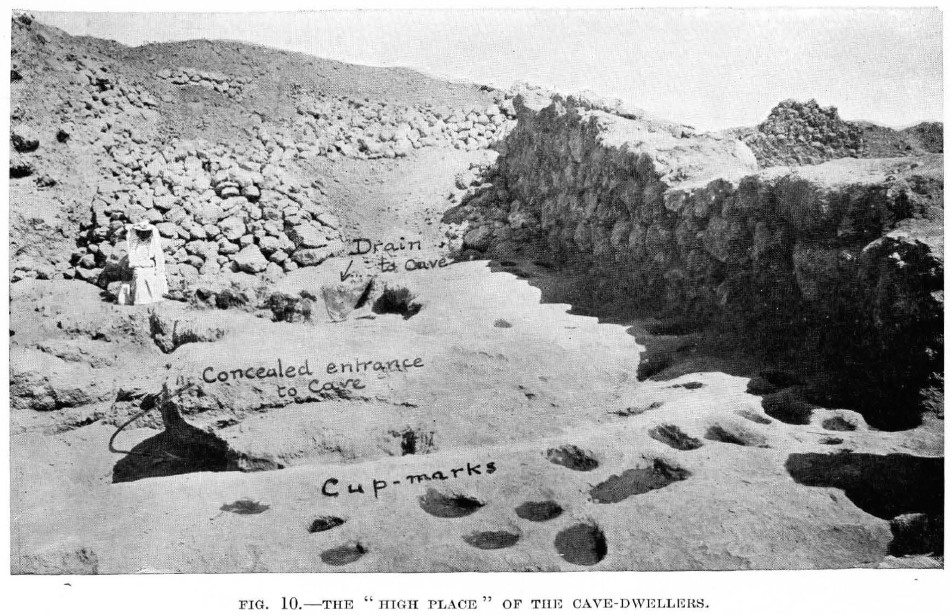
Iniquity of the Amorite "That a Canaanite altar should consist of a heap of human heads covered with earth is a new idea, though it is not inherently improbable; for it is evident from the excavations that the Canaanites showed an Aztec-like disregard of the value of human life."

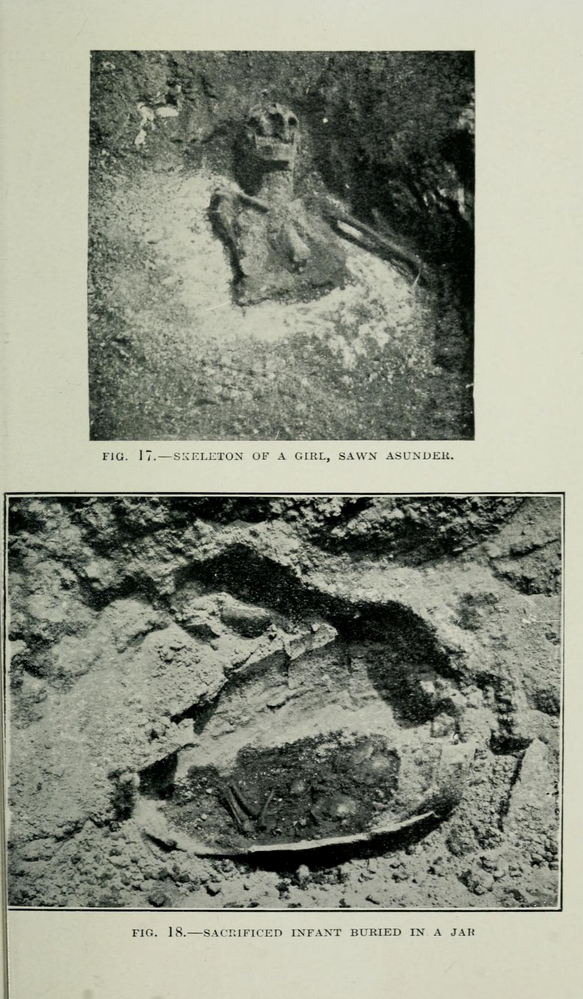

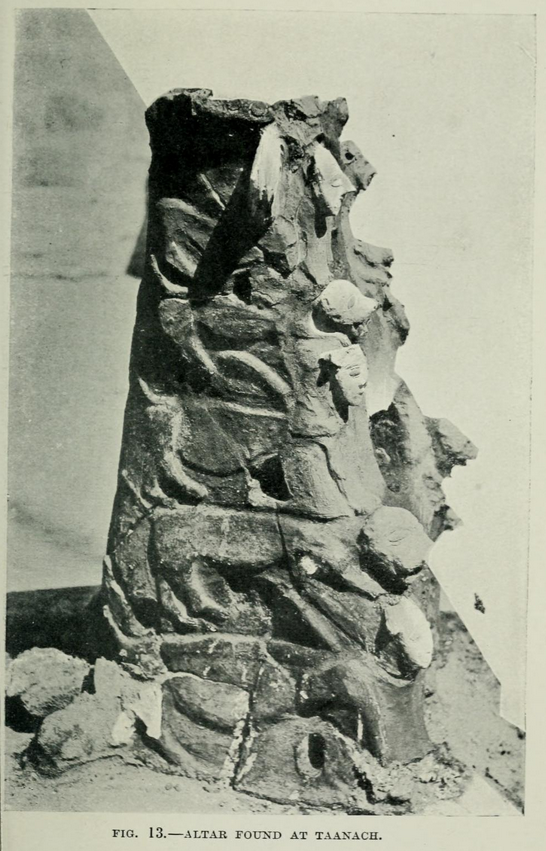

== Published works ==
- Macalister, R.A.S (1896), Ecclesiastical Vestments: Their Development and History
- —— (1897), Studies in Irish Epigraphy
- —— (1905), Fís Mherlíno; the vision of Merlino, an Irish allegory : An Irish Allegory (in Irish and English), Dublin, M.H. Gill
- ——; Jones, F.; Wunsch; Bliss, F.J. (1902), Excavations in Palestine, 1898–1900
- —— (1906), Bible side-lights from the mound of Gezer : a record of excavation and discovery in Palestine
- —— (1908), The Story of the Crop-Eared Boy; The Story of the Eagle-Boy : Two Irish Athurian Romances, For the Irish Texts Society by D. Nutt
- —— (1909), The Memorial Slabs of Clonmacnois, King's County
- —— (1912), The Excavation of Gezer: 1902 - 1905 and 1907 - 1909, London: John Murray
  - Vol.1, alt link
  - Vol.II, alt link
  - Vol.III [Plates], alt link
- —— (1912), A History of Civilization in Palestine
- —— (1913), "The Philistines: Their History and Civilization", The Schweich Lectures, London: Milford
- —— (1914), Muiredach, abbot of Monasterboice, 890–923 A. D.; his life and surroundings
- ——; Westropp, T.J.; Macnamara, G.U. (1916), The antiquities of Limerick and its neighbourhood
- —— (1919), "Temair Breg: a study of the remains and traditions of Tara", Proceedings of the Royal Irish Academy: Archaeology, Culture, History, Literature, 34, Royal Irish Academy: 231–399, JSTOR 25504215
- —— (1921), A Text Book of European Archaeology, Cambridge, Univ. Press
- —— (1921), The Latin and Irish Lives of Ciaran, The Macmillan company
- —— (1921), Ireland in Pre-Celtic Times
- —— (1925), A Century of Excavation in Palestine
- —— (1926), Excavations on the hill of Ophel, Jerusalem, 1923-1925, being the joint expedition of the Palestine exploration fund and the 'Daily Telegraph'
- —— (1928), The Archaeology of Ireland, London: Methuen
- —— (1931), Tara, a Pagan Sanctuary of Ancient Ireland
- —— (1932), "The 'Fermoy' Copy of Lebor Gabála", Ériu, 11: 172–173, JSTOR 30008098
- —— (1935), Ancient Ireland : A study in the Lessons of Archaeology and History
- —— (1937), "The Secret Languages of Ireland", Nature, 139 (3521): 692, Bibcode:1937Natur.139..692., doi:10.1038/139692a0, hdl:2027/uc1.31158006018807, S2CID 4117164
- —— (ed.), Lebor Gabála Érenn - The Book of the Taking of Ireland, Irish Texts Society by Educational Company of Ireland
  - Part I, 34, 1938, ISBN 1-870166-34-5
  - Part II, 35, 1939, ISBN 1-870166-35-3
  - Part III, 39, 1940, ISBN 1-870166-39-6
  - Part IV, 41, 1941, ISBN 1-870166-41-8
  - Part V, 44, 1956, ISBN 1-870166-44-2
- —— (1945), Corpus Inscriptionum Insularum Celticarum

== Works on Macalister ==
- (2015), Villain or Visionary? Samuel R Wolff

== See also ==
- Lebor Gabála Érenn

== Bibliography ==
- Thomas, Page A. (1984), "The Success and Failure of Robert Alexander Stewart Macalister", Biblical Archaeologist, 47 (1): 33–35, doi:10.2307/3209874, JSTOR 3209874, S2CID 165610704
- "MACALISTER, Robert Alexander Stewart", Who Was Who, A & C Black (Bloomsbury Publishing), online edn, Oxford University Press, 2012
- "R. A. Stewart Macalister (MLSR889RA)". A Cambridge Alumni Database. University of Cambridge.
- Fagan, Brian (2004). "Macalister, Robert Alexander Stewart (1870–1950)". Oxford Dictionary of National Biography (online ed.). Oxford University Press. doi:10.1093/ref:odnb/57475. (Subscription, Wikipedia Library access or UK public library membership required.)
