= Alexander Carr-Saunders =

British sociologist and biologist

Sir Alexander Carr-Saunders KBE FBA
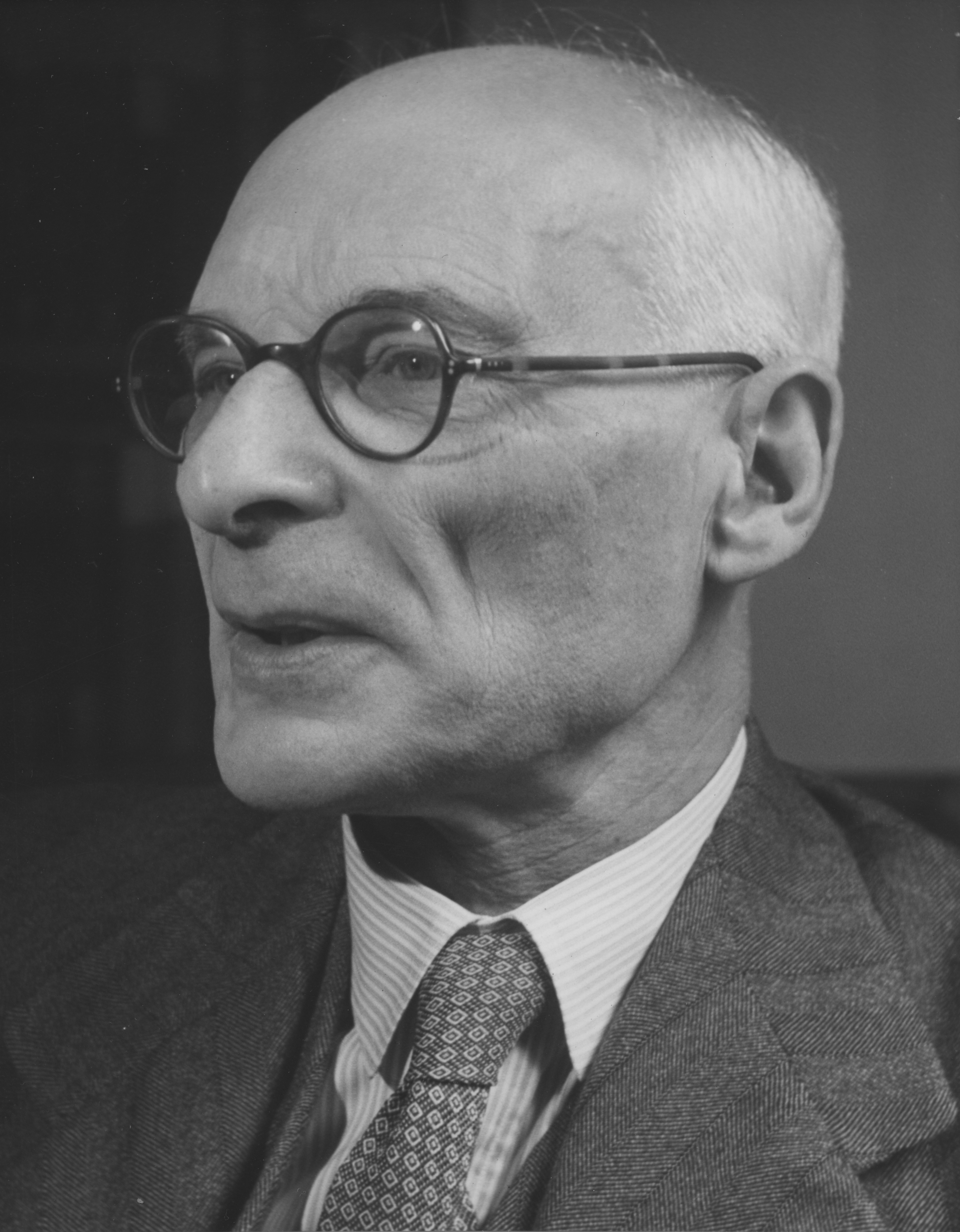
- Carr-Saunders in c.1960

5th Director of the London School of Economics and Political Science
- In office 1937–1957
- Preceded by: Sir William Beveridge
- Succeeded by: Sir Sydney Caine

Personal details
- Born: Alexander Morris Carr-Saunders; 14 January 1886 Reigate, Surrey, England
- Died: 6 October 1966 (aged 80)
- Spouse: Teresa Molyneux-Seel
- Relations: Catherine Maxwell Stuart, 21st Lady of Traquair (granddaughter)
- Children: 1
- Education: Eton College
- Alma mater: Magdalen College, Oxford
- Awards: Knight Bachelor (1946); FBA (1946); KBE (1957)

Military service
- Allegiance: United Kingdom
- Branch/service: British Army
- Years of service: 1914–1918
- Rank: Captain
- Unit: Royal Army Service Corps
- Battles/wars: World War I

Sir Alexander Morris Carr-Saunders, KBE, FBA (14 January 1886 – 6 October 1966) was an English biologist, sociologist, academic, and academic administrator. He was Director of the London School of Economics from 1937 to 1957.

== Early life ==
Carr-Saunders was born on 14 January 1886 in Reigate, Surrey, England. He was educated at Eton College, an all-boys public school in Eton, Berkshire. He then studied biology at Magdalen College, specialising in zoology. He graduated from the University of Oxford with a first class honours Bachelor of Arts (BA) degree in 1908.

== Career ==
=== Early career ===
Carr-Saunders remained a year at the University of Oxford as a demonstrator in comparative anatomy. He left in 1910 to join the University College London where he studied biometrics under Karl Pearson, a proponent of Social Darwinism and eugenics. Deciding against natural science, he instead read for the Bar of the Inner Temple.

Concerned about all kinds of social ills and problems, he saw a solution in eugenics for the engineering of society into a better condition. He became the secretary of the Eugenics Education Society and lived at Toynbee Hall.

=== Military service ===
When World War I broke out in 1914, he attempted to obtain a commission in the London Scottish Regiment, but was instead commissioned into the Royal Army Service Corps. He spent the first year of the war in France on the Western Front. He was then posted to a ration depot at Suez, Egypt, due to the high standard of his French. He was promoted to temporary lieutenant on 12 December 1914, and to temporary captain on 27 January 1918.

=== Later career ===
After the Armistice he returned to the Zoology department of the University of Oxford, taking an interest in ecological issues, especially population and overpopulation. He participated in the 1921 Oxford University Spitsbergen expedition, one of the first Oxford Expeditions to Spitsbergen in the Arctic, as main scientist, together with Julian Huxley. During the expedition he distilled his early ideas on population dynamics and summarized them in a book called The Population Problem. The book used a neo-Malthusian argument plus Francis Galton's ideas on eugenics as the theoretical framework for a quantitative analysis of population dynamics. The population problem arose -according to Carr-Saunders hypothesis- from the fact of having high reproductive rates among primitive people with low mental and physical qualities. Over-population of these lower races endangered the standard of living of races bearing higher qualities. Unlike Malthus, he thought that industrial productivity and not food was the main limiting factor in human populations..

The success of his magnum opus The Population Problem resulted in his appointment to the Charles Booth Chair of Social Science at the University of Liverpool in 1923. In 1936, he was appointed the first Chair of the Population Investigation Committee. In 1937, he was appointed to succeed Sir William Beveridge as Director of the London School of Economics, and held that post until his retirement in 1955. He served on the Royal Commission on Population, in 1944–1949. He served as President of the Geographical Association (who held their Annual Conferences at LSE for many decades) during 1947. In 1947 he further served as chairman of the commission which recommended the establishment of the University of Malaya.

Carr-Saunders was one of the mentors of the animal ecologist Charles Elton, greatly influencing Elton's approach toward animal ecology as a "sociology and economy of animals"

== Honours ==
For his military service during World War I, Carr-Saunders was awarded three medals; the 1914 Star or 1914–15 Star, the British War Medal, and the Victory Medal.

In the 1946 New Year Honours, Carr-Saunders was appointed a Knight Bachelor (Kt) in recognition of his role as Director of the London School of Economics and Political Science. On 12 March 1946, he was knighted by King George VI during a ceremony at Buckingham Palace. In 1946, he was also elected a Fellow of the British Academy (FBA), and awarded the first Galton medal by the Eugenics Society. In the 1957 New Year Honours, he was appointed a Knight Commander of the Order of the British Empire (KBE) "for services as Director of the London School of Economics".

== Personal life and death ==
Carr-Saunders was married to Teresa Molyneux-Seel (alumna of Somerville College, Oxford) and lived at a 16th-century mansion, Water Eaton, Oxfordshire, where his son Nicholas Saunders was born in 1938. His daughter, Flora Carr-Saunders, married Peter Maxwell Stuart, 21st Laird of Traquair.

Educational offices
Preceded by William Beveridge	Director of the London School of Economics; 1937–1957	Succeeded by Sydney Caine

Baronage of Scotland
Preceded by 19th Baron of Traquair	20th Baron of Traquair; 1886-1966	Succeeded by Catherine Maxwell Stuart, 21st Lady of Traquair
