= Eugene Grebenik =

British statistician

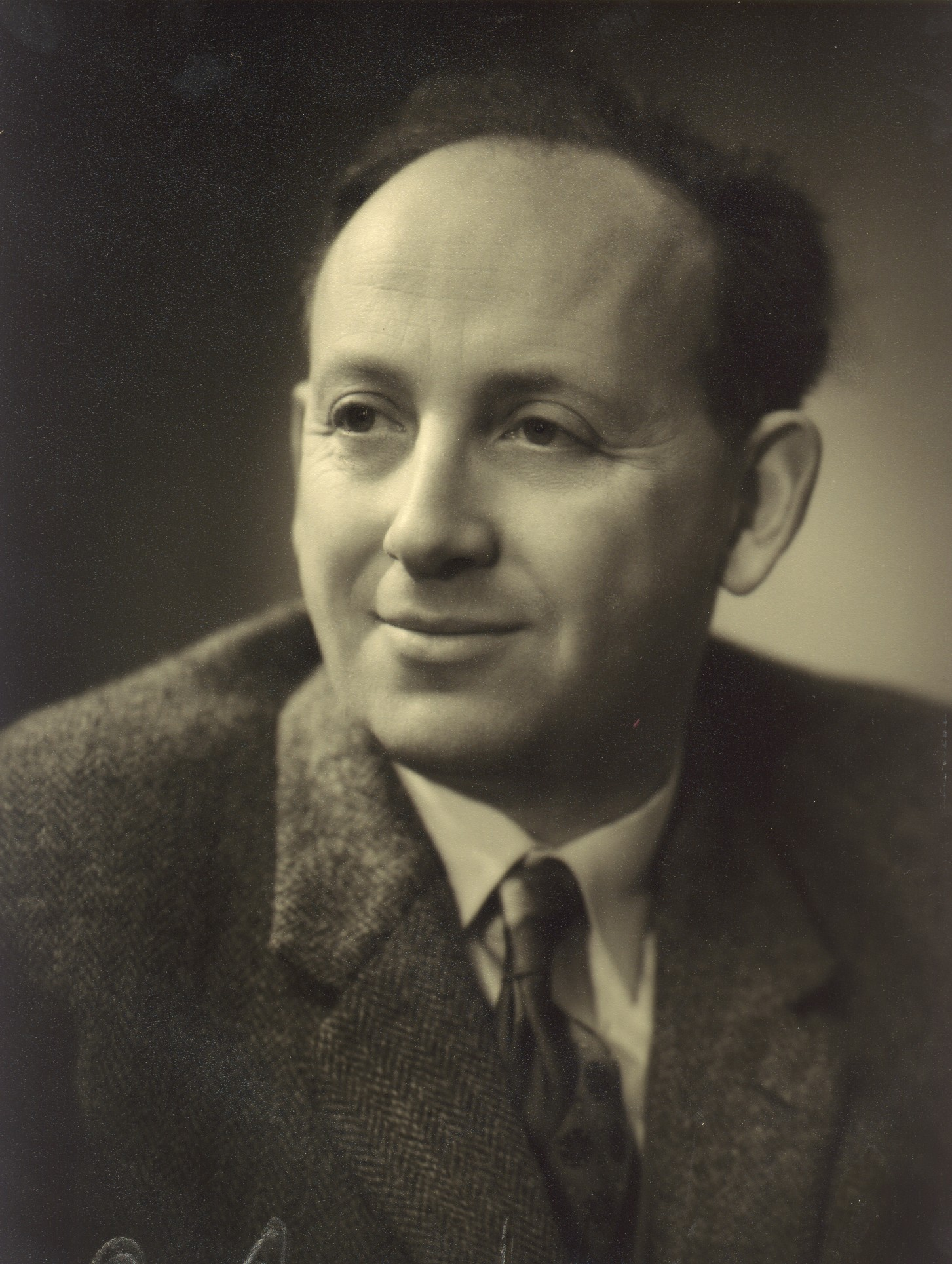
- Early 1960s, at Leeds
- Born: 20 July 1919; Kyiv, Ukrainian SSR
- Died: 14 October 2001 (aged 82); Oxford, England
- Scientific career
- Fields: Demography

Eugene Grebenik CB (Ukrainian: Євген Гребеник; 20 July 1919 – 14 October 2001), known as "Grebby", was a British civil servant who was a central figure in the development of demography in Britain. He was the first director of the UK's Civil Service College.

== Early life and education ==
Grebenik was born in Kyiv a few months after the establishment of the Ukrainian SSR. He was the only son and elder child of Jewish parents Schulim Grebenik (1887–1972), estate agent, and his wife, Lea Helene (née Lopatizkaya; 1894–1985), a qualified lawyer. His birth was not registered with the Soviet government because his mother did not want him to be naturalised and thought that this was mandatory. He had a sister, Renata Rosalie. The family moved to Danzig in 1920, then to Berlin, and finally, after the rise of Adolf Hitler, to England in 1933. Grebenik could speak several European languages but none like a native. All his life he was known as Grebby, because he never liked the association with eugenics born by the name 'Eugene'.

He attended the Xaverian College Catholic high school in Brighton.

Grebenik went to the London School of Economics in 1935 aged sixteen, and graduated with a first-class degree in economics (with statistics and demography as his special subject) at eighteen. He earned the Farr medal and prize.

== Career ==
After a brief spell working in the City of London, he returned to the LSE as research assistant to Arthur Bowley, and then moved to Bristol to work with H. A. Shannon. Their book, The Population of Bristol, was published in 1943. Rejected by the army due to his foreign birth, Grebenik returned to the LSE in 1940 and graduated MSc in 1941.

Promoted to lecturer in statistics in 1944, Grebenik was seconded to the Admiralty for the final year of World War II as a statistical officer, where he worked with William Brass. He was then seconded for a year to the secretariat of the Royal Commission on Population. He was naturalised on 23 November 1946 and shortly afterwards married Virginia Barker.

Grebenik worked with David Glass, editor of Population Studies, from its inception in 1947—and continued to be associated with the journal as joint and then sole editor for fifty years. He was promoted to reader in demography at the LSE in 1949. His work with Glass on the 1946 family census, published in two volumes as The Trend and Pattern of Fertility in Great Britain (1954), was a landmark in cohort analysis. In 1954 Grebenik was appointed professor of social studies at the University of Leeds.

In 1970 Grebenik was appointed the first principal of the Civil Service College at Sunningdale. He left the college in 1976 to conduct research at the Office of Population Censuses and Surveys, working with Abraham Manie Adelstein and John Fox, where he remained until he retired in 1984.

Grebenik was secretary-general of the International Union for the Scientific Study of Population from 1963 to 1973. He organised three of the IUSSP's four-yearly general population conferences, including the one held in Belgrade in 1965 in conjunction with the second United Nations world population conference. He was also president of the British Society for Population Studies from 1979 to 1981. Among other honours, In 1997, he was the first recipient of the Olivia Schieffelin Nordberg award from the Population Council in New York.

He and Virginia had three children: Michael, Peter and Catherine.

== Other sources ==
- Coleman, D. A. (2003). "Eugene Grebenik". Annals of Human Biology. 30 (6): 637–8. doi:10.1080/03014460310001607671. S2CID 58847137.
- Kirk, Maurice (6 December 2001). "Eugene Grebenik: A versatile demographer in pursuit of truth". The Guardian.
