= Norman Alexander =

New Zealand physicist

Professor Sir Norman Alexander CBE

Vice-Chancellor of Ahmadu Bello University
- In office 1961–1966

Professor of Physics, University College, Ibadan
- In office 1952–1960

Professor of Physics, University of Malaya
- In office 1949–1952

Professor of Physics, Raffles College
- In office 1936–1949

Personal details
- Born: Norman Stanley Alexander; 7 October 1907 Te Awamutu, New Zealand
- Died: 26 March 1997 (aged 89)

Sir Norman Stanley Alexander (7 October 1907 – 26 March 1997) was a New Zealand physicist instrumental in the establishment of many Commonwealth universities, including Ahmadu Bello University in Nigeria, and the Universities of the West Indies, the South Pacific and Botswana, Lesotho and Swaziland. He was knighted in 1966.

== Early life ==
Alexander was born in Te Awamutu, New Zealand. Alexander was one of eight children of farmers whose ancestors were immigrants from the United Kingdom and Denmark.

Alexander took his early education at Hamilton High School before moving to the University of Auckland to study physics, graduating with a Bachelor of Science with first class honours in 1927. In 1930, Alexander achieved a two-year scholarship to Trinity College, Cambridge to study physics at the Cavendish Laboratory with Ernest Rutherford.

== World War II ==
He was imprisoned in Changi Prison in 1942, and word made its way to New Zealand that he had died, when he was in fact alive. Using his academic knowledge, Alexander helped to build a salt evaporation plant at Changi and a small industrial plant that fermented surgical spirit and other products for the prison hospital. After his release he eventually headed a New Zealand commission of investigation into abuses at Sime Road Internment Camp.

== Career summary ==
- Physics lecturer at Auckland University College
- 1930 – won the Commonwealth scholarship to Trinity College, Cambridge.
- 1936–49 Professor of Physics, Raffles College, Singapore.
- 1949–52 Dean of Science, University of Malaya
- 1952–58 Professor of Physics and Vice-president, University College, Ibadan, Nigeria
- 1958–60 Professor of Engineering Physics, Middle East Technical University, Ankara, Turkey
- 1961–66 Vice Chancellor, Ahmadu Bello University, Nigeria
- 1966 University of the West Indies
- 1966–68 Vice Chancellor University of the South Pacific, Laucala Bay, Fiji
- 1970 – Advisor: UK Ministry of Overseas Development, Inter-University Council for Higher Education Overseas, London University School of Oriental and African Studies

== Personal life ==
Alexander was married to noted meteorologist Frances Elizabeth Somerville Alexander née Caldwell and have three children William (1937), Mary (1939) and Bernice (1941).

== Awards and honours ==
Alexander was promoted to Commander of the Order of the British Empire in the 1959 Birthday Honours, and was knighted in March 1966.
