= David Nicoll Lowe =

David Nicoll Lowe FRSE OBE (1909–1999) was a Scottish botanist and administrator. He served as Secretary to the Carnegie Trust in Dunfermline 1954 to 1970. He greatly improved the relationship between the Trust and its applicants.

== Life ==
He was born in Arbroath on 9 September 1909. He attended Arbroath High School then won a Kitchener Scholarship to St Andrews University. At university he founded the Mountaineering Club and served as its first President. He graduated both MA and BSc.

Following graduation he intended to join the Civil Service. In 1935 he was appointed Secretary of the British Association for the Advancement of Science. In the Second World War he sat on the War Cabinet Secretariat, linked to the Ministry of Production. He returned the British Association after the war, and stayed until 1954.

He was elected a Fellow of the Royal Society of Edinburgh in 1957. His proposers were James Ritchie, Sir George Taylor, Sir Maurice Yonge, and Douglas Allan. During his Secretaryship of the Carnegie Trust the trust went into other social fields: re-equipping village halls; helping to set up the Leonard Cheshire Homes; helping the YMCA; and promoting art schools. Specific one-off projects included the David Marshall Lodge at Aberfoyle and creation of the Conservation Corps.

He retired in 1968 and moved to Crieff with his wife. He became an active member of the Countryside Commission and the National Trust for Scotland. He died on 10 August 1999.

== Family ==
He was married to Muriel Enid Bryer (d.1991). They had a son and three daughters.
