= Norman Wright (agriculturalist) =

British chemist and agriculturalist (1900–1970)

Sir Norman Charles Wright FRSE CB FRIC (19 February 1900 – 16 July 1970) was a British chemist and agriculturalist, and most his work was as a nutrition scientist. He rose to be the main advisor on nutrition to the United Nations based in Rome.

In the 1960s, he was seen as the man able to solve the world's food problems.

== Life ==
Norman Charles Wright was born in Reading, Berkshire on 19 February 1900, the second son of Rev Francis Henry Wright, first registrar at the University of Reading, and his second wife, Agnes Mary Dunkley. He was educated at the Choir School attached to Christ Church Cathedral, Oxford, his classmates including William Walton. He then studied Sciences at Oxford University specialising in Chemistry. He graduated MA in 1922 then did a doctorate at Cambridge University gaining his PhD in 1925. He specialised in food and nutrition research.

From 1924 to 1926 Wright spent two years at the National Institute for Research in Dairying based in Reading then spent a year at Cornell University in America, under a Commonwealth Fund Fellowship. This was followed by a year in Washington DC at the United States Department of Agriculture.

In 1930, Wright was appointed first permanent Director of the recently created Hannah Dairy Research Institute in Ayr in south-west Scotland, following two years on a temporary contract there. In 1936 he made an important study trip to India with Sir John Russell, advising on the Indian dairy industry.

In 1945 Wright was elected a Fellow of the Royal Society of Edinburgh. His proposers were James Ritchie, James Edward Nichols, Alan William Greenwood and Thomas J. Mackie.

After the Second World War (in 1947) Wright was appointed Chief Scientific Advisor to the Ministry of Food (succeeding Sir Jack Drummond) and was central to the food rationing system in post-war Britain and in attempts to keep the population healthy and well-fed. From this important role in 1959 he moved to be Deputy Director General of the United Nations Food and Agriculture Organisation, advising on an international level to multiple countries around the world. This was based in Rome. He continued this role until 1963 when he went into semi-retiral. He joined the British Association that year.

Wright was knighted by Queen Elizabeth II in 1963. Leeds University awarded him an honorary doctorate (LLD) in 1967.

Wright died at home, 65 Addison Road in London on 16 July 1970.

== Publications ==
- The Far Infrared Absorption Spectra of Ammonia and Phosphine Gases Under High Resolving Power, (1933)
- Report on the Development of the Cattle and Dairy Industries (1940)

== Family ==
In 1928, Wright married Janet Robison Ledingham Rennie, daughter of Dr John Rennie of Aberdeen
