= Jurong Formation =

The Jurong formation is a sedimentary rock formation that covers the south-west portion of the island of Singapore. The formation was laid down in the late Triassic to early or middle Jurassic geologic periods. It consists of dolomite, limestone, mudstone, sandstone, shale, and conglomerates that have been acutely folded and faulted as the result of tectonic plate movement.
