= Alexander Oppenheim =

British mathematician and university administrator

Sir Alexander Oppenheim OBE, PMN, FRSE
- Born: 4 February 1903; Salford, United Kingdom
- Died: 13 December 1997 (aged 94); Henley-on-Thames, United Kingdom
- Education: University of Oxford; University of Chicago
- Known for: Oppenheim conjecture
- Awards: Fellow of the Royal Society of Edinburgh (1956)
- Scientific career
- Fields: Mathematics
- Workplaces: University of Benin; University of Ghana; University of Singapore; University of Malaya; University of Edinburgh
- Thesis: Minima of Indefinite Quadratic Quaternary Forms (1930)
- Doctoral advisor: L.E. Dickson

Sir Alexander Oppenheim, OBE, PMN, FRSE (4 February 1903 – 13 December 1997) was a British mathematician and university administrator. In Diophantine approximation and the theory of quadratic forms, he proposed the Oppenheim conjecture.

== Early life and education ==
Oppenheim was born on 4 February 1903 in Salford. His first language was Yiddish. He grew up in Manchester and attended Manchester Grammar School, where he was recognised as a mathematical prodigy. His teachers considered him too young to attend university and delayed his entrance to scholarship competitions until 1921, when he received a scholarship to Balliol College, Oxford. In each of his three undergraduate years at the University of Oxford, Oppenheim was the Oxford University mathematical scholar. He also captained the university chess team. He graduated with first-class honours in 1924 and was the senior mathematical scholar in 1926.

He was awarded a Commonwealth Fellowship to study at Princeton University and the University of Chicago. He completed a PhD at the University of Chicago in 1930 under the supervision L.E. Dickson with a thesis titled Minima of Indefinite Quadratic Quaternary Forms, published in the 1920 Proceedings of National Academies of Sciences. Oppenheim received a second doctorate, a DSc, from the University of Oxford in 1954 for his academic work later in his career.

== Career ==
=== Early career ===
After graduating, Oppenheim spent one year as a lecturer at the University of Edinburgh. He left Edinburgh in 1931 for a professorship at the Raffles College in Singapore.

=== Prisoner of war ===
During the Japanese occupation of Singapore, he served in the Singapore Reserve Army with the rank of lance-bombardier. His wife and young daughter escaped Singapore during this time. He was captured by the Japanese in 1942 and was held as a prisoner of war at Changi Camp.

At Changi Camp, Oppenheim helped establish a rudimentary "POW University" with 29 other captured academics and was elected Dean by his fellow prisoners. They had persuaded camp commandant Lieutenant Okazaki to allow them to collect books from Raffles College, hold courses in a dozen classrooms, and organize discussion groups.

Oppenheim's health deteriorated while at Changi Camp and was frequently seriously ill. His involvement at the informal university was interrupted when he was transferred to work on the Siam–Burma Railway.

=== University administration and later life ===
From 1945 to 1949, he resumed his position as a Professor in Mathematics at Raffles College. In 1947, he was the deputy principal, acting principal, and Dean of the Faculty of Arts. Oppenheim played a key role in the 1949 merger of Raffles College with King Edward VII College of Medicine to form the University of Malaya. He was appointed acting Vice-Chancellor in 1955 and then Vice-Chancellor in 1957, and remained in that position until his retirement in 1965. During his time as Vice-Chancellor, he oversaw the establishment of the new Kuala Lumpur campus of the university.

After leaving the University of Malaya, Oppenheim served as visiting professor at the University of Reading until 1968. At the invitation of Alexander Kwapong, he taught at the University of Ghana from 1968 to 1973. He then served as the head of the mathematics department at the University of Benin in Nigeria until 1977, when he retired.

He lived in Henley-on-Thames until his death there on 13 December 1997 at the age of 94.

== Research ==
Oppenheim's most important works were in the theory of quadratic forms. In 1929, he proposed the Oppenheim conjecture about representations of numbers by real quadratic forms in several variables.

== Personal life ==
Oppenheim married Beatrice Templer Nesbit (d. 1990) in 1930. They had one daughter and dissolved their marriage in 1977. In 1982, he married Margaret Ng, with whom he had two sons.

== Honours ==
In 1955, Oppenheim was appointed an Officer of the Order of the British Empire, and was made a knight bachelor in 1961. Oppenheim was elected a Fellow of the Royal Society of Edinburgh in 1956. He was awarded the Distinguished Alumni Medal from the University of Chicago in 1977. He received honorary doctorates from The University of Hong Kong, The University of Leeds, and The National University of Singapore. In 1962, he was appointed Honorary Commander of the Order of the Defender of the Realm, conferring upon him the title of "Tan Sri" by the Sultan of Malaysia.

== Selected publications ==
- Oppenheim, A. (1926). "On an Arithmetic Function". Journal of the London Mathematical Society. s1-1 (4): 205–211. doi:10.1112/jlms/s1-1.4.205.
- Oppenheim, A. (1927). "On an Arithmetic Function (II)". Journal of the London Mathematical Society. s1-2 (2): 123–130. doi:10.1112/jlms/s1-2.2.123.
- Oppenheim, A. (1929). "The minima of indefinite quaternary quadratic forms". Proceedings of the National Academy of Sciences of the United States of America. 15 (9): 724–727. Bibcode:1929PNAS...15..724O. doi:10.1073/pnas.15.9.724. PMC 522544. PMID 16577226.
- Oppenheim, Alexander (1931). "The Minima of Indefinite Quaternary Quadratic Forms". Annals of Mathematics. 32 (2): 271–298. doi:10.2307/1968191. JSTOR 1968191.
- Opponheim, A. (1971). "Representations of real numbers by series of reciprocals of odd integers". Acta Arithmetica. 18: 115–124. doi:10.4064/aa-18-1-115-124. ISSN 0065-1036.
- Oppenheim, A. (1972). "The representation of real numbers by infinite series of rationals". Acta Arithmetica. 21: 391–398. doi:10.4064/aa-21-1-391-398. ISSN 0065-1036.
