= Polish Panel Survey =

Polish-based panel survey program

Polish Panel Survey (POLPAN)
- Established: 1988
- Focus: Sociology
- Address: Polskie Badanie Panelowe (POLPAN); Institute of Philosophy and Sociology PAN ul. Nowy Świat 72; 00-330 Warszawa, Polska
- Location: Warsaw, Poland
- Website: www.polpan.org

The Polish Panel Survey (POLPAN, Polskie Badanie Panelowe) is a program of panel surveys of the population of Poland carried out by the Research Team on Comparative Social Inequality at the Institute of Philosophy and Sociology of the Polish Academy of Sciences. The study started in 1988 and is repeated in five-year intervals. The focus of the Polish Panel Survey is to describe Poland's social structure and its change.

POLPAN data and documentation from the waves 1988, 1993, 1998, and 2003 are available for download at GESIS – Leibniz Institute for the Social Sciences and from the Polish Social Data Archive. The latter archive also contains 2008 POLPAN wave data and documentation.

== Methodology and scope ==
Initially, in 1988, the survey was conducted among a national sample representing Poland’s adult population (aged 21–65), with N = 5,817 respondents. In 1993, this sample was randomly reduced to 2,500 individuals, whom researchers tried to reach in each of the consecutive five-year waves. To ensure an adequate age balance, additional subsamples involving young cohorts have been supplemented later. For example, the 2008 sample comprised 1,825 respondents of whom 1,244 belong to the strict panel, and 581 are newly added individuals aged 21–25 years. In 2013 an attempt was made to contact all respondents (7,261) who had ever participated in the study, which resulted in achieving a sample of 2,780. The 2018 sample comprises 2,161 respondents.

Data collection is carried out through questionnaire interviews by the Centre of Sociological Research at IFiS PAN.

The survey collects the following information:

- Employment (employment, self-employment, irregular employment and additional jobs, unemployment and housework);
- Occupational history
- Social, economic and political opinions and attitudes (chances of success and sources of conflicts, opinions about income, opinions about society, about privatization and the market, status evaluation and views on social issues);
- Friends and acquaintances;
- Family and household;
- Physical and psychological health;
- Religion;
- Intelligence (Raven's Test);
- Computer and Internet;
- Demographics.

== See also ==
- Socio-Economic Panel (SOEP)
- British Household Panel Survey (BHPS)
- Household, Income and Labour Dynamics in Australia Survey (HILDA)
- Panel Study of Income Dynamics (PSID)
- LISS panel (LISS)
- Survey on Household Income and Wealth (SHIW)

== Notes ==
Selected bibliography of POLPAN:

- Slomczynski, Kazimierz M.; Tomescu-Dubrow, Irina, eds. (2016). "Analyzing Social Change: The Polish Panel Survey, POLPAN 1988-2013. An issue devoted to the Polish Panel Survey, POLPAN". International Journal of Sociology. 46 (4). ISSN 0020-7659.
- Filipkowski, Piotr; Życzyńska-Ciołek, Danuta (2016). "Od kwestionariuszowego badania próby losowej do pogłębionej analizy życiowych przypadków – i z powrotem. Dwa wywiady biograficzne i kilka refleksji teoretycznych [From quantitative research based on a random sample to in-depth analysis of life experiences – and back. Two biographical interviews and a few theoretical reflections]". Studia Socjologiczne. 3 (222): 229–254. ISSN 0039-3371.
- Kunovich, Robert M.; Kunovich, Sheri L. (2016). "The Gender Gap in Political Knowledge in Poland". Polish Sociological Review. 1 (193): 33–49. ISSN 1231-1413.
- Kołczyńska, Marta; Merry, Joseph J. (2016). "Preferred Levels of Income Inequality in a Period of Systemic Change: Analysis of Data from the Polish Panel Survey, POLPAN 1988-2003". Polish Sociological Review. 2 (194): 171–189. ISSN 1231-1413.
- Słomczyński, Kazimierz M.; Tomescu-Dubrow, Irina; Dubrow, Joshua K. (2015). "Changes in Social Structure, Class, and Stratification: The Polish Panel Survey (POLPAN)" (PDF). ASK: Research & Methods. 24 (1): 19–37. ISSN 1234-9224.
- Kiersztyn, Anna (2015). "Solidarity Lost? Low Pay Persistence During the Post-Communist Transition in Poland". Polish Sociological Review. 4 (192): 493–509. ISSN 1231-1413.
- Baczko-Dombi, Anna; Wysmułek, Ilona (2015). "Determinants of Success in Public Opinion in Poland: Factors, Directions and Dynamics of Change". Polish Sociological Review. 3 (191): 277–293. ISSN 1231-1413.
- Tomescu-Dubrow, Irina (2015). "International Experience and Labour Market Success: Analysing Panel Data from Poland". Polish Sociological Review. 3 (191): 259–276. ISSN 1231-1413.
- Kryszczuk, Maciej D.; Green, Brian E. (2015). "Digital Divide in Poland: An Exploration of Some Sociological Impacts of Personal Computer Possession, Internet Use and PC Proficiency". Management and Business Administration. Central Europe. 23 (3): 2–18. doi:10.7206/mba.ce.2084-3356.147. ISSN 2450-7814.
- Janicka, Krystyna; Slomczynski, Kazimierz M. (2014). "Struktura spoleczna w Polsce: klasowy wymiar nierownosci [Social Structure in Poland: Class Dimension of Social Inequality]". Przegląd Socjologiczny. 63 (2): 55–72. ISSN 0033-2356.
- Kunovich, Robert M. (2013). "Political Knowledge in Poland". Communist and Post-Communist Studies. 46 (1): 65–78. doi:10.1016/j.postcomstud.2012.12.005. ISSN 0033-2356.
- Rossi, Maurizio; Scappini, Ettore (2013). "Possiamo ancora dirci cristiani? La volatilità della partecipazione individuale alla messa [Can we still call ourselves Christian? The inconsistency of individual Church attendance]". Polis. 27 (3): 363–394. ISSN 1120-9488.
- Kiersztyn, Anna (2013). "Stuck in a mismatch? The Persistence of Overeducation During Twenty Years of the Post-Communist Transition in Poland". Economics of Education Review. 32 (1): 78–91. doi:10.1016/j.econedurev.2012.09.009. ISSN 0272-7757.
- Slomczynski, Kazimierz M.; Tomescu-Dubrow, Irina, eds. (2013). "Sociodemographic Differentiation in a Dynamic Perspective: The Polish Panel Survey, POLPAN 1988–2008. An issue devoted to the Polish Panel Survey, POLPAN". International Journal of Sociology. 42 (4). ISSN 0020-7659.
- Slomczynski, Kazimierz M.; Tomescu-Dubrow, Irina, eds. (2012). "Changes in Social Structure, Class, and Stratification: The Polish Panel Survey (POLPAN)". International Journal of Sociology. 42 (1). ISSN 0020-7659.

Books:

- Slomczynski, Kazimierz M.; Tomescu-Dubrow, Irina; Życzyńska-Ciołek, Danuta; Wysmułek, Ilona, eds. (2016). Dynamics of Social Structure: Poland's Transformative Years, 1988–2013. Warsaw: IFiS Publishers. ISBN 9788376831275.
- Slomczynski, Kazimierz M.; Wysmułek, Ilona, eds. (2016). Social Inequality and the Life Course: Poland's Transformative Years, 1988–2013. Warsaw: IFiS Publishers. ISBN 9788376831312.
- Slomczynski, Kazimierz M.; Marquart-Pyatt, Sandra L., eds. (2007). Continuity and Change in Social Life: Structural and Psychological Adjustment in Poland. Warsaw: IFiS Publishers. ISBN 978-8373881327.
- Slomczynski, Kazimierz M., ed. (2005). The Polish Panel Study POLPAN, 1988–1993–1998–2003. Warsaw: IFiS Publishers. ISBN 978-8373880061.
- Slomczynski, Kazimierz M., ed. (2002). Social Structure: Changes and Linkages – The Advanced Phase of the Post-Communist Transition in Poland. Warsaw: IFiS Publishers. ISBN 978-8387632014.
- Slomczynski, Kazimierz M., ed. (2000). Social Patterns of Being Political – The Initial Phase of the Post-Communist Transition in Poland. Warsaw: IFiS Publishers. ISBN 978-8387632014.
