= Survey of Consumer Finances =

The Survey of Consumer Finances (SCF) is a triennial statistical survey of the balance sheet, pension, income and other demographic characteristics of families in the United States; the survey also gathers information on the use of financial institutions.

The SCF is sponsored by the United States Federal Reserve Board in cooperation with the U.S. Treasury Department. Since 1992, data have been collected by the National Opinion Research Center at the University of Chicago. Data from the survey are widely used, from analysis at the Federal Reserve and other branches of government to scholarly work at the major economic research centers.

== Methodology ==
Participation in the study is strictly voluntary. About 4,500 to 6,500 families are interviewed in the main study. In the 2004 survey, the median interview length was about eighty minutes. In complicated cases, the amount of time needed was substantially more than two hours. Most interviews were obtained in person, although interviewers may conduct telephone interviews if that was more convenient for the respondent.

Wealth in the U.S. is relatively concentrated, with more than a third of the total being held by one percent of the population. In order to address issues relevant to the full distribution of wealth, the survey combines two techniques for random sampling.

First, a standard multistage area-probability sample (a geographically based random sample) is selected to provide good coverage of characteristics, such as homeownership, that are broadly distributed in the population.

Second, a supplemental sample is selected to disproportionately include wealthy families, which hold a relatively large share of such thinly held assets as noncorporate businesses and tax-exempt bonds. Called the "list sample", this group is drawn from a list of statistical records derived from tax returns. These records are used under strict rules governing confidentiality, the rights of potential respondents to refuse participation in the survey, and the types of information that can be made available. Individuals listed by Forbes magazine as being among the Forbes 400 (the wealthiest 400 people in the U.S.) are excluded from sampling.

The response rate in the area-probability sample is more than double that in the list sample. In both 2001 and 2004, about 70 percent of households selected for the area-probability sample actually completed interviews. The overall response rate in the list sample was about 30 percent; in the part of the list sample likely containing the wealthiest families, the response rate was only about 10 percent. To retain the scientific validity of the study, interviewers are not allowed to substitute respondents for families that do not participate. Thus, if a family declines to participate, it means that families like theirs may not be represented clearly in national discussions.

The survey interviews are conducted largely between the months of May and December in each survey year by NORC.

== Results ==
The latest available results are those of the 2022 survey. Two general types of data set are provided – first, the full public data set is given in DAP/SAS, Stata and ASCII computer formats; second, an extract file of summary variables is provided in Microsoft Excel spreadsheet format. All of these files are provided in compressed form as ZIP files.

== See also ==
- Economic data
- Panel Study of Income Dynamics
- Survey of Current Business

Similar surveys in other countries

- British Household Panel Survey
- Household, Income and Labour Dynamics in Australia Survey
- Socio-Economic Panel (Germany)
- Survey on Household Income and Wealth (Italy)
