= Future of Families and Child Wellbeing Study =

Longitudinal study of American families

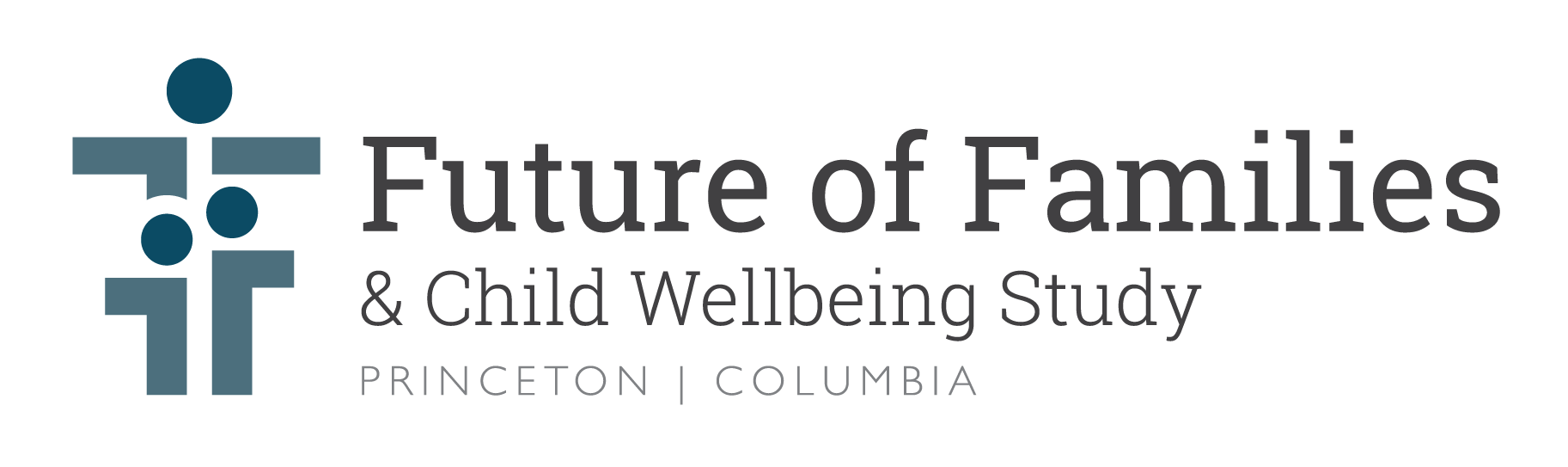
- Status: Active
- Country: United States
- Inaugurated: 1998; 28 years ago
- Founder: Sara McLanahan, Irwin Garfinkel, Ron Mincy
- Participants: 4,898 families
- Major events: Longitudinal study
- Leader: Kathryn Edin, Jane Waldfogel
- Website: ffcws.princeton.edu

The Future of Families and Child Wellbeing Study (FFCWS) is a longitudinal birth cohort study of American families. Formerly known as the Fragile Families and Child Wellbeing Study, the study's name was changed in January 2023.

Core aims of the study are to learn about the capabilities and relationships of unmarried parents and how children and parents in these families fare using various health, economic, and social measures over time. The FFCWS uses a stratified random sampling technique and oversampled non-marital births. Baseline data collection ran from 1998 to 2000, featuring interviews with both biological parents shortly after children's births as well as the collection of medical records. Follow-up interviews were conducted when the children were 1, 3, 5, 9, and 15 years old; as of the time of writing, 22-year interviews are currently being fielded. In addition to parent interviews, the follow-up waves included in-home assessments, child care or teacher questionnaires, and interviews with the child.

Most data for the FFCWS is available for free with the opportunity for users to access restricted contextual data through a contract data process. Some key findings of the study include that unmarried parents and their children face a host of social challenges and tend to have loving but ultimately unstable relationships. Additionally, most fathers are active in their children's lives, contributing emotionally and materially. The FFCWS has also been utilized for reflections on data quality and survey methodologies. The study is run by Princeton University and Columbia University.

== Research topics ==
The FFCWS is a unique dataset providing a wealth of information on contemporary families. Originally designed to understand and provide data on children who were born to unmarried parents, the FFCWS acknowledged that these children were not born to single mothers but to families, though the parental bonds may have been fragile. While, in the 1990s, it was known that children living with single mothers after a divorce fared worse than children living in two-parent married households, until the FFCWS, little data was available about children born to unmarried parents – a rapidly growing demographic at the time. The FFCWS is a critical source of data on the wellbeing of children born to unmarried parents, parents' relationships with each other, father involvement, and how parents' roles have changed over time. The FFCWS aims to better understand the underlying causes of social problems associated with unmarried families and study the impact of policies on family formation and child development.

The FFCWS's initial research questions focused on gathering information on four domains: (1) socioeconomic background of unmarried parents, especially fathers; (2) relationship patterns between unmarried parents; (3) life outcomes of children in these families; and (4) the impact of policies and environmental conditions on families and children. Some of the major topic areas covered are as follows.

- Household characteristics: roster of family members, family members' demographic information, child's living arrangements, employment and income, housing and neighborhood characteristics, religion
- Incarceration: current status and history of parents and new partners
- Family relationships: relationship between the biological parents, new partnerships, social support, church attendance, civic participation
- Parental health and cognitive ability: physical health, mental health, cognitive ability
- Parenting: nurturance, discipline, cognitive stimulation, relationship with child, Child Protective Services involvement
- Child health and development: child use of medical care, child health, child nutrition, daily routines, cognitive development, child behavior, child relationships
- Child care/kindergarten: child care use, child care provider characteristics
- Elementary school: school characteristics, classroom characteristics, teacher characteristics, child's behavior, special education services, comparative academic performance, parental involvement
- Genetic analysis: mother and child, genetic predisposition, gene-environment interaction
- Program participation: Temporary Assistance for Needy Families, food stamps, Medicaid, Earned Income Tax Credit, child support enforcement, housing assistance

== Survey process ==
=== Sampling ===
The 4,898 children in the FFCWS were born in hospitals in 20 large cities across the United States between 1998 and 2000. These cities all had populations above 200,000 and were selected for diversity in child support enforcement, labor market conditions, and welfare generosity. Instead of drawing simple random samples directly from the cities' newborn populations, the researchers used a stratified model, first sampling hospitals within each city and then sampling births from each hospital.

The study oversamples births to unmarried parents by 3 to 1. The use of an oversample of unmarried couples made survey participants disproportionately low-income and thus especially relevant for studying various social disadvantages. The FFCWS public data files include weights for each wave of data collection that can be used to make the sample representative of urban births nationwide.

=== Survey administration ===
After informed consent was obtained from the focal children's parents, baseline data collection consisted of an interview with the biological mother and biological father, usually in-person at the hospital shortly after the child's birth or conducted by phone. Birth hospitalization records for the mother and infant were also collected when possible.

The parents were each interviewed in a follow-up wave after roughly one year. For most interviewees, the study occurred over the telephone. For those not directly reachable by phone, researchers sent out local field interviewers to encourage participants to either call the interview administrators back or partake in at-home interviews.

When the child was three, the parents were interviewed again by phone. There was also a visit to the child's home and an in-person interview with the child's primary caregiver. The primary caregiver was usually the mother, but it could also be the father or someone else who spent the most time with custody over the child in a family setting, like a grandparent. If present, the mother and the child would complete cognitive assessments, and their heights and weights were collected. The interviewer also gathered observational data on the home environment, the appearance and behaviors of the family, and the neighborhood. In 15 of the 20 cities, the non-familial child care setting—a child care center or an informal child care arrangement—was also observed, and a caretaker at these institutions completed a survey.

The Year 5 interview contained the same components as the Year 3 interview, except that in Year 5 the child's kindergarten teacher also completed the Kindergarten Study Teacher Survey. Through this survey, the teacher provided information about themselves, their observations of the child's academic skills and behavior, and data on the school climate, school resources, and classroom characteristics.

Around the child's ninth birthday, both parents were interviewed by phone. Again, a home visit included a primary caregiver interview and physical and cognitive assessments of the child. The primary caregiver also filled out a paper survey. This wave included the first in-person interview with the child and the collection of saliva samples by the mother and child for DNA analysis. The children themselves were asked for informed assent before the study. All families with home visits were then asked for contact information for the child's elementary school teacher, who was mailed a survey.

An age 15 follow-up included interviews with the primary caregiver and the teen and DNA collection for teens. Home visits were conducted for a subset of the sample. Collaborative projects included a sleep and physical activity study from the in-home sample, an adolescent brain development study in three cities, and a mobile phone diary study of adolescent relationships.

In late 2020, the seventh wave of data collection started for 22-year-olds and their families. This wave contains interviews for the 22-year-olds and their primary caregivers from the Year 15 survey. In addition to survey data, DNA data, brain data, sleep data, cardiovascular health data, administrative data, and data on the 22-year old's partners as well as their own children are also being collected through collaborative studies.

=== Data sharing ===
Public data for the Baseline-Year 15 waves of FFCWS are available for free. They contain 17,000+ variables and are hosted in the Office of Population Research's data archive. Some of these variables are constructed variables that combine information from several directly collected variables to more reliably measure social concepts. Examples of these constructed variables include scores for the Peabody Picture Vocabulary Test and the Woodcock-Johnson Comprehension Test. More sensitive information, such as certain geographic identifiers and contextual Census data, may be obtained on a contract basis. Data protection requirements of a contract agreement help to protect participant confidentiality because the multi-domain nature of the FFCWS's data increases the risk for participants to be personally identified.

Metadata, or descriptions of the data, are freely available for the FFCWS. By 2018, the FFCWS had undergone a major redesign of metadata presentation system. Now, the metadata available are not only in the form of human-readable documents but also in the form of machine-readable data tables and an interactive Metadata Explorer website.

== Findings ==
Nearly 1,300 peer-reviewed articles, books and book chapters, and dissertations or theses have been written using data from the FFCWS.20 Together with sociologists Ron Haskins and Elisabeth Donahue, Sara McLanahan, Garfinkel, and Mincy summarized in 2010 that the FFCWS had four major findings. Firstly, despite earlier conceptions, a large majority of unmarried parents had intimate and loving relationships when their children were born. Over 50% of the unwed couples surveyed in the baseline were living together, and another 36% were dating each other. Secondly, unmarried parents faced numerous challenges regarding career opportunities, family life, and child rearing. Unmarried mothers were on average six years younger than married mothers but were three times more likely to have had another child with another partner. The presence of multiple father figures inside and outside the family increased the likelihood of significant social tensions. In addition, unwed parents reported lower incomes, poorer health, and higher rates of substance abuse. Unmarried fathers were five times more likely to have a prison record, and incarceration was shown to have darkened employment prospects and disrupted family relations. Perhaps as a result, the FFCWS's third major finding suggested that despite initial closeness, families with unwed parents proved relatively unstable, with only 35% of the couples staying together when the child reached the age of 5. Finally, births to unmarried parents were associated with poorer test performance and increased behavioral problems for children.

In addition to these findings, researchers have used the data to examine the importance of fathers in young adults' lives, childhood sleep, adolescent relationships, child protective service contact, exposure to deadly gun violence, eviction prevalence, and law enforcement exposure, among many other topics. A complete bibliography of publications using FFCWS is available at the FFCWS website.

== Data quality ==
The timing of the in-hospital baseline interview was conceptualized as a "magical moment" that allowed researchers to enroll people who would have been unable to participate under other circumstances. According to sociologist Kathleen Kiernan's review of large-scale studies on Western families, the FFCWS differs from most other studies starting between the mid-1990s and mid-2010s because of the project's diligence in tracking non-custodial parents, generally fathers living outside the household.

However, the project has several limitations. The research team excluded births in hospitals where less than 10% of the births were to unmarried parents. The researchers also excluded parents who planned to put their children up for adoption or who were below the age of 18 and were prohibited from giving interviews per hospital policy. Such exclusions create selection bias and render the sample less representative of the US population. Even within the selected sampling frame, non-response bias occurs. Many parents did not participate in the study because they could not complete the interviews in English or Spanish, and many fathers could not be contacted for interview. Finally, social desirability bias may cause respondents to underreport some measures such as substance abuse and domestic violence. Survey weights are available to address some of these concerns.

In 2017, a team of scholars led by sociologist Matthew J. Salganik organized a Fragile Families Challenge, which invited 160 teams from across the world to apply machine learning algorithms to data from Years 0 to 9 to predict six outcomes in Year 15. None made very accurate predictions. Salganik, along with a team of other researchers including Ian Lundberg, Kathryn Edin, Tim Nelson, and Susan Clampet-Lundquist subsequently conducted qualitative interviews with a subset of the FFCWS sample to try and understand the limits to these predictive models.

== Funding and management ==
The FFCWS is a joint project of Princeton University and Columbia University and is funded by a consortium of private foundations and government agencies. At Princeton, the project is actively managed through the Bendheim-Thoman Center for Research on Child Wellbeing. Princeton's Institutional Review Board oversees ethical considerations related to the study. At Columbia, this project is managed by the Columbia Population Research Center. The project was founded by Princeton sociologist Sara McLanahan and Columbia sociologists Irwin Garfinkel and Ron Mincy. The current principal investigators of the project are sociologist Kathryn Edin from Princeton and social economist Jane Waldfogel from Columbia. Previous principal investigators include McLananhan, Garfinkel, and Mincy, plus Princeton economist and public health expert Christina Paxson and Columbia psychologist Jeanne Brooks-Gunn.

Data collection for Year 9, Year 15, and Year 22 of the FFCWS was predominantly administered by the research service provider Westat. The previous four waves of data collection were conducted by Mathematica Policy Research, and the first wave was also conducted by the National Opinion Research Center.

== See also ==
- Early Childhood Longitudinal Program
- Family structure in the United States
- Millennium Cohort Study
- National Longitudinal Study of Adolescent to Adult Health
