= LISS panel =

The LISS panel (Longitudinal Internet studies for the Social Sciences) is an online household panel. The panel consists of some 5000 households in the Netherlands, comprising approximately 7500 individuals over the age of 16. The panel is based on a true probability sample of households drawn from the population register by Statistics Netherlands. Households without prior Internet access are equipped with a computer and broadband Internet.

The LISS panel provides scientists and policy makers with a facility to carry out surveys, with a focus on longitudinal studies. Data collected in the LISS panel are available at no charge to the wider research and policymaking community in the Netherlands and abroad, upon signing a user statement. The datasets are provided in SPSS and Stata formats. The documentation is available in English and Dutch.

The panel is maintained at the research institute Centerdata.

The LISS panel is the core element of a project entitled Measurement and Experimentation in the Social Sciences (MESS). In 2006, the NWO (Netherlands Organization for Scientific Research) awarded a grant to Centerdata to initiate this project. At first, the MESS project was planned for a period of seven years (2006 to 2013) and entailed both an optimal infrastructure for empirical research in the social sciences and the financial resources to carry out this research. In addition to the LISS panel, special groups were sampled and interviewed within the MESS project, e.g. immigrants or the elderly.

Since 2014 funding for carrying out surveys comes from the researchers themselves. The project is still strongly geared to integrating different academic disciplines and developing and testing new, innovative research techniques.

== See also ==
- British Household Panel Survey (BHPS), UK
- Panel Study of Income Dynamics (PSID), USA
- Socio-Economic Panel (SOEP), Germany
