= LifE Study =

German panel study with 3 generations since 1979

Life Paths into Early Adulthood [Lebensverläufe ins frühe Erwachsenenalter] (LifE 3G Study)
- Type of project: Prospective cohort study
- Location: University of Potsdam, University of Zurich, University of Innsbruck
- Key people: Helmut Fend, Fred Berger, Wolfgang Lauterbach
- Established: 1979
- Website: https://life3g.de/

The LifE study is a continuing longitudinal study in the field of educational sociology, initiated in Germany and ongoing since 1979. The study examines the individual development of approximately 1500 participants in the context of familial relationships and various life domains across multiple life stages.

== History ==
Initiated by educational researcher Helmut Fend at the University of Konstanz, the LifE-Study initially involved approximately 2000 children and adolescents born between 1962 and 1969 from both urban and rural regions in the German state of Hesse. Participants were surveyed annually from 1979 to 1983. The original phase included additional data collected from parents and teachers, expanding the total sample size to around 3,000 individuals.

Follow-up surveys were conducted in 2002 (participants then aged around 35), 2012 (age ~45), and 2024 (age ~57). Over time, the study has expanded to include the children of the original participants, creating a multi-generational dataset. It addresses research questions regarding continuity and change across generations, educational and occupational trajectories, family relationships, personality development, health outcomes, and social integration.

== Methodology and funding ==
The study uses standardized questionnaires, structured interviews, and systematic tracking of participants to ensure reliable and consistent results. Participation rates remained high through subsequent waves, with approximately 80% of original participants reached again in 2024. Comparisons with external datasets such as the German Socio-Economic Panel (SOEP) and the German Microcensus have been conducted to assess representativeness.

The LifE-Study is a collaborative project involving several academic institutions, notably the University of Potsdam, the University of Zurich, and the University of Innsbruck. Funding has consistently been provided by research bodies such as the German Research Foundation (DFG), the Austrian Science Fund (FWF), and the Swiss National Science Foundation (SNF).

== Re-using the data ==
Data from the LifE-Study have been utilized in numerous peer-reviewed reports published in international journals, including Developmental Psychology and the Journal of Personality and Social Psychology, as well as leading German educational journals. Independent evaluations have highlighted the value of the study's extensive longitudinal data, particularly for investigating developmental patterns across multiple life stages and generations.

Data from earlier waves have been made available through repositories such as GESIS (Leibniz Institute for the Social Sciences), enabling researchers to conduct independent analyses and verify findings.

== Results ==
The LifE-Study is a resource for longitudinal research on education, family sociology, developmental psychology, and related disciplines. Its findings demonstrate early and high predictability of educational attainment and career paths from age twelve onward. The study validates the meritocratic function of educational systems: For highly gifted children from lower social classes, it is evident that academic performance is the most significant factor determining the level of educational attainment. Conversely, for students from higher social classes, career outcomes are less dependend on cognitive competencies and more by social background.

The study also examined the impact of school tracking systems, showing that integrated schools did not significantly reduce educational inequality compared to tracked schools. Additionally, gender disparities were observed in educational and career trajectories, with pronounced income and status differences between men and women, especially after child-rearing years. The German vocational system effectively provides qualifications early in life but restricts further educational advancement, unlike more permeable systems found in countries such as Canada.

Social relationships exhibit significant long-term continuity and predictability. Early family relationship quality and adolescent friendships strongly influence adult romantic and parental relationships, psychological well-being, emotional stability, and life satisfaction, outweighing educational and career trajectories in impact. Additionally, the study reveals gender-specific relationship patterns, notably highlighting the enduring closeness of mother-daughter relationships.

The home and school are identified as core determinants of cultural, religious, and political orientations in adulthood. Surprisingly, parental influence remains highly significant, with many individuals closely adhering to their parents' orientations into adulthood. Schools primarily foster refined cultural orientations absent from home environments, while religious beliefs predominantly stem from parental models. Positive parent-child relationships and constructive parenting practices in childhood and adolescence are key factors for the intergenerational transmission of values and behaviors .

Personality and health analyses underscore the roles of self-efficacy and self-esteem, identifying low self-esteem as a significant vulnerability factor for the development of depression. Relational quality during adolescence and adulthood profoundly affects self-esteem levels and mental health outcomes.

Furthermore, over three decades, the study notes substantial changes in respect and empathy toward adolescents in schools and families, documenting a crucial humanization of school education.

== See also ==
- Longitudinal Study of Young People in England
- National Longitudinal Surveys
