= Cross-National Equivalent File =

- Director: Dean Lillard
- Website: https://www.cnefdata.org/

The Cross-National Equivalent File (CNEF) is a project that harmonizes and maintains cross nation data for researchers across the world. Current CNEF organization contains data from general population household-based panel surveys fielded in 9 countries, namely Australia, Canada, Germany, Great Britain, Japan, Korea, Russia, Switzerland and the United States.

== Management ==
The project was originally started by Dr. Richard Burkhauser at Cornell University. The CNEF is currently managed by Dean Lillard at the Department of Human Sciences of Ohio State University.

== Data collection and processing ==
Each of the participating countries conducts a longitudinal survey of households and their residents. Researchers from various institutions collaborate with CNEF to harmonize a subset of data from these surveys. This cross-national data collection is designed to enable researchers even with little experience in panel data analysis to access a simplified version of the panels, while also providing guidelines for experienced users to create equivalent variables across countries. The harmonized data can be used individually or collectively by researchers to compare social and economic outcomes over time and across different countries. By utilizing a cross-national design, researchers can investigate whether variations in observed outcomes are attributable to differences in policies, social conditions, and economic contexts across nations.

== Participant surveys ==
- British Household Panel Survey (BHPS), UK
- Understanding Society, the UK Household Longitudinal Study (UKHLS), UK
- Household, Income and Labour Dynamics in Australia Survey (HILDA), Australia
- Japan Household Panel Study (JHPS), Japan
- Korea Labor Income Panel Study (KLIPS), Korea
- Panel Study of Income Dynamics (PSID), US
- Socio-Economic Panel (SOEP), Germany
- Survey of Labour and Income Dynamics (SLID), Canada
- Swiss Household Panel (SHP), Switzerland
- Russia Longitudinal Monitoring Survey (RLMS-HSE), Russia
