= FADFED =

FADFED is a methodology for public opinion research that combines elements of quantitative and qualitative approaches. Developed in Amman, Jordan, FADFED has been used in the Middle East, Europe, and the United States.

FADFED, translated "Speak it Out" or "Let it Out" in Arabic, was invented by Dr. Sami Hourani and introduced by the Leaders of Tomorrow organization in Amman in 2010. FADFED involves placing white sheets of paper in public spaces and inviting individuals to write on these sheets of paper their responses to a given question prompt or prompts. Researchers using FADFED categorize respondents by demographics as suits their research purposes; for instance, by age or gender. A researcher does so by establishing a color coding of markers used at a particular event. Red markers might be given to women, or green markers to those over 50 years old, as an example. FADFED generates both written and oral discussion and debate on subject topics, and thus raises awareness of often controversial or politically sensitive issues. FADFED may be accompanied by surveys that help to establish demographic data for a given opinion-gathering event.

FADFED is primarily qualitative in nature, but because it attracts many responses quickly (often hundreds in one or two hours) the data produced can be assessed quantitatively as well. In some ways, FADFED resembles focus group research in that it produces open-ended responses from many people in a short amount of time. However, because all FADFED responses are given independently, there is no danger that one voice or opinion could dominate a group discussion, as there can be in focus group research. FADFED gives equal voice to all who choose to respond.
