= Irwin Garfinkel =

American social worker and economist

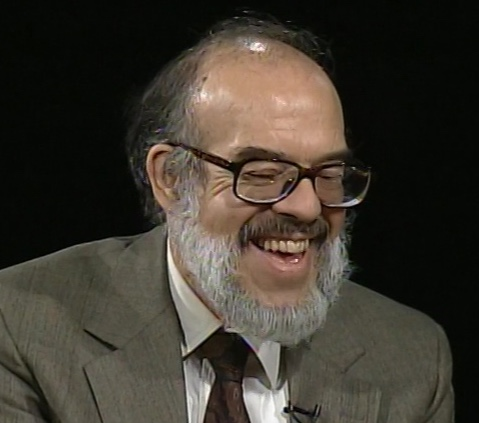
Garfinkel on CUNY TV's Urban Agenda (1997)

Irwin Garfinkel is an American social worker, economist, and professor emeritus known for his research on social welfare policy, poverty and inequality, benefit cost analysis and child wellbeing. He is the Mitchell I. Ginsberg Professor Emeritus of Contemporary Urban Problems at the Columbia University School of Social Work and a co-founder of the Columbia Population Research Center (CPRC) and the Center on Poverty and Social Policy (CPSP).

== Education ==
Garfinkel earned a Bachelor of Arts in History from the University of Pittsburgh in 1965 and a Master of Arts in Social Work from the University of Chicago in 1967. He completed his Ph.D. in Social Work and Economics at the University of Michigan in 1970.

== Career ==
He began his academic career at the University of Wisconsin–Madison, where he served as director of the Institute for Research on Poverty from 1975 to 1980 and later as director of the School of Social Work from 1982 to 1984. He led the Wisconsin Child Support Study, which informed child support reforms in the U.S., Great Britain, Australia, and Sweden.

In 1991, he began his tenure at Columbia University, where he held the Mitchell I. Ginsberg Professorship until his retirement in 2022. During his time at Columbia, he co-founded the Center for Poverty Research and Policy (CPRC) in 2007 and the Center for Social Policy and Practice (CPSP) in 2015. From 2016 to 2019, he also served as interim dean of Columbia's School of Social Work.

In 1998, he was appointed by the National Research Council to the Panel on Data and Methods for Measuring the Effects of Changes in Social Welfare Programs, contributing his expertise to shaping research in this important area.

Garfinkel’s research has influenced the understanding of poverty, family structures, and social policy. In his book Wealth and Welfare States: Is America Laggard or Leader? , he challenged misconceptions about the U.S. welfare system, arguing that the American welfare state is not unusually small, that America was a world leader in the provision of mass public education from the middle of the 19th century to about 1970, and that rather than undermining productivity, the welfare state has enhanced productivity. His work on child support enforcement demonstrated how a new child support assurance system could reduce poverty among single-parent households, shaping reforms in multiple U.S. states, the US as a whole, and internationally. He co-authored the influential Single Mothers and Their Children: The Battle for Self-Sufficiency with Sara McLanahan. The book explores the economic and social challenges faced by single-mother families in the United States and argues for policy solutions that both support work and enhance economic security for the nation’s poorest children.

Garfinkel also advanced methodologies for measuring poverty. He advocated for the Supplemental Poverty Measure (SPM), which accounts for near cash government assistance, such as food stamps and housing subsidies, providing a more nuanced understanding of economic hardship. His collaborations with scholars like Christopher Wimer and Jane Waldfogel on the Poverty Tracker highlighted cyclical poverty patterns and informed policy proposals like increases in the minimum wage.

== Personal life ==
In 1982, Garfinkel married Sara McLanahan, an assistant professor in sociology at the University of Wisconsin who became a scholar on family structure and inequality and together they raised her three children with his two children in a blended family. McLanahan, died of cancer on December 31, 2022, at the age of 81.

== Awards and honors ==
- Lifetime Achievement Award, Society for Social Work and Research (2015)
- Frank R. Breul Memorial Prize (2011)
- Fellow of American Academy of Social Work and Social Welfare (2010)

== Selected publications ==
=== Journals ===
- Jiménez-Solomon, Oscar; Garfinkel, Irwin; Wall, Melanie; Wimer, Christopher (2024). "When money and mental health problems pile up: The reciprocal relationship between income and psychological distress". SSM - Population Health. 25 101624. doi:10.1016/j.ssmph.2024.101624. PMC 10876910. PMID 38380052.
- Collyer, Sophie; Curran, Megan A.; Garfinkel, Irwin; Harris, David; Parolin, Zachary; Waldfogel, Jane; Wimer, Christopher (2023). "The Child Tax Credit and Family Well-Being: An Overview of Reforms and Impacts". The Annals of the American Academy of Political and Social Science. 706 (1): 224–255. doi:10.1177/00027162231205148. ISSN 0002-7162.
- Garfinkel, Irwin; Sariscsany, Laurel; Ananat, Elizabeth; Collyer, Sophie; Hartley, Robert P.; Wang, Buyi; Wimer, Christopher (2022). "The Benefits and Costs of a Child Allowance". Journal of Benefit-Cost Analysis. 13 (3): 335–362. doi:10.1017/bca.2022.15. ISSN 2194-5888.
- Sariscsany, Laurel; Garfinkel, Irwin; Nepomnyaschy, Lenna (2019). "Describing and Understanding Child Support Trajectories". Social Service Review. 93 (2): 143–182. doi:10.1086/703191. ISSN 0037-7961.
- Lee, Dohoon; Brooks-Gunn, Jeanne; McLanahan, Sara S.; Notterman, Daniel; Garfinkel, Irwin (2013-08-20). "The Great Recession, genetic sensitivity, and maternal harsh parenting". Proceedings of the National Academy of Sciences of the United States of America. 110 (34): 13780–13784. Bibcode:2013PNAS..11013780L. doi:10.1073/pnas.1312398110. ISSN 1091-6490. PMC 3752274. PMID 23918380.
- Sinkewicz, Marilyn; Garfinkel, Irwin (2009). "Unwed fathers' ability to pay child support: new estimates accounting for multiple-partner fertility". Demography. 46 (2): 247–263. doi:10.1353/dem.0.0051. ISSN 1533-7790. PMC 2831274. PMID 21305392.
- Crane, Jonathan; Manski, Charles F.; Garfinkel, Irwin (1992). "Evaluating Welfare and Training Programs". Contemporary Sociology. 21 (6): 867. doi:10.2307/2075695. ISSN 0094-3061. JSTOR 2075695.
- Garfinkel, Irwin (1972). "Equal Access, Minimum Provision, and Efficiency in Financing Medical Care". The Journal of Human Resources. 7 (2): 242–249. doi:10.2307/145186. ISSN 0022-166X. JSTOR 145186.
- Garfinkel, Irwin (1973). "Is In-Kind Redistribution Efficient". The Quarterly Journal of Economics. 87 (2): 320–330. doi:10.2307/1882195. ISSN 0033-5533. JSTOR 1882195.
- GARFINKEL, IRWIN; ORR, LARRY L. (1974-06-01). "Welfare Policy and the Employment Rate of Afdc Mothers". National Tax Journal. 27 (2): 275–284. doi:10.1086/ntj41861948. hdl:2027/mdp.39015041363527. ISSN 0028-0283.

=== Books ===
- Smeeding, Timothy M., ed. (2011). Young disadvantaged men: fathers, families, poverty, and policy. Annals of the American Academy of Political and Social Science. Lose Angeles: SAGE Publ. ISBN 978-1-4522-0538-0.
- Garfinkel, Irwin (January 28, 2010). Wealth and Welfare States: Is America a Laggard or Leader? (1st ed.). OUP Oxford. ISBN 978-0191037559.
- Garfinkel, Irwin; Haveman, Robert H. (2013). Earnings Capacity, Poverty, and Inequality. Burlington: Elsevier Science. ISBN 978-1-4832-6052-5.
- Garfinkel, Irwin; McLanahan, Sara (1986). Single mothers and their children: a new American dilemma. The changing domestic priorities series (4. [print.] ed.). Washington, DC: Urban Inst. Pr. ISBN 978-0-87766-405-5.
- Garfinkel, Irwin (1992). Assuring child support: an extension of social security. New York: Russell Sage Foundation. ISBN 978-0-87154-300-4.
- Garfinkel, Irwin (1982). Income-tested transfer programs: the case for and against. Institute for Research on Poverty monograph series. Institute for research on poverty, Ford foundation, United States. New York: Academic Press. ISBN 978-0-12-275880-5.
