= Longitudinal study =

Study with repeated observations over time

A longitudinal study (or longitudinal survey, or panel study) is a research design that involves repeated observations of the same variables (e.g., people) over long periods of time (i.e., uses longitudinal data). It is often a type of observational study, although it can also be structured as longitudinal randomized experiment.

Longitudinal studies are often used in social-personality and clinical psychology, to study rapid fluctuations in behaviors, thoughts, and emotions from moment to moment or day to day; in developmental psychology, to study developmental trends across the life span; and in sociology, to study life events throughout lifetimes or generations; and in consumer research and political polling to study consumer trends. The reason for this is that, unlike cross-sectional studies, in which different individuals with the same characteristics are compared, longitudinal studies track the same people, and so the differences observed in those people are less likely to be the result of cultural differences across generations, that is, the cohort effect. Longitudinal studies thus make observing changes more accurate and are applied in various other fields. In medicine, the design is used to uncover predictors of certain diseases. In advertising, the design is used to identify the changes that advertising has produced in the attitudes and behaviors of those within the target audience who have seen the advertising campaign. Longitudinal studies allow social scientists to distinguish short from long-term phenomena, such as poverty. If the poverty rate is 10% at a point in time, this may mean that 10% of the population are always poor or that the whole population experiences poverty for 10% of the time.

Longitudinal studies can be retrospective (looking back in time, thus using existing data such as medical records or claims database) or prospective (requiring the collection of new data).

Cohort studies are one type of longitudinal study which sample a cohort (a group of people who share a defining characteristic, typically who experienced a common event in a selected period, such as birth or graduation) and perform cross-section observations at intervals through time. Not all longitudinal studies are cohort studies; some instead include a group of people who do not share a common event.

As opposed to observing an entire population, a panel study follows a smaller, selected group - called a 'panel'.

== Advantages ==
When longitudinal studies are observational, in the sense that they observe the state of the world without manipulating it, it has been argued that they may have less power to detect causal relationships than experiments. Others say that because of the repeated observation at the individual level, they have more power than cross-sectional observational studies, by virtue of being able to exclude time-invariant unobserved individual differences and also of observing the temporal order of events.

Longitudinal studies do not require large numbers of participants (as in the examples below). Qualitative longitudinal studies may include only a handful of participants, and longitudinal pilot or feasibility studies often have fewer than 100 participants.

== Disadvantages ==
Longitudinal studies are time-consuming and expensive.

Longitudinal studies cannot avoid an attrition effect: that is, some subjects cannot continue to participate in the study for various reasons. Under longitudinal research methods, the reduction in the research sample will bias the remaining smaller sample.

Practice effect is also one of the problems: longitudinal studies tend to be influenced because subjects repeat the same procedure many times (potentially introducing autocorrelation), and this may cause their performance to improve or deteriorate.

== Examples ==
Study name	Type	Country or region	Year started	Participants	Remarks
45 and Up Study	Cohort	Australia	2006	267,153	The 45 and Up Study is a longitudinal study of participants aged 45 years and over in New South Wales conducted by the Sax Institute. Researchers are able to analyze Study data linked to MBS and PBS data, the NSW cancer registry, State hospitalizations, and emergency department visits and mortality data. The Study is used by both researchers and policymakers to better understand how Australians are aging and using health services to prevent and manage ill-health and disability and guide health system decisions. 45 and Up is the largest ongoing study of healthy aging in the Southern Hemisphere.
Alzheimer's Disease Neuroimaging Initiative	Panel	International	2004	n/a	–
Australian Longitudinal Study on Women's Health (ALSWH)	Cohort	Australia	1996	50,000	Includes four cohorts of women: born between 1921 and 1926, 1946–1951, 1973–1978 and 1989–1995
Avon Longitudinal Study of Parents and Children (ALSPAC)	Cohort	United Kingdom	1991	14,000	–
Born in Bradford	Cohort	United Kingdom	2007	12,500	–
1970 British Cohort Study (BCS70)	Cohort	United Kingdom	1970	17,000	Monitors the development of babies born in the UK in one particular week in April 1970
British Doctors Study	Cohort	United Kingdom	1951	40,701	Monitored the health of British male doctors. It provided convincing evidence of the link between smoking and cancer.
British Household Panel Study	Panel	United Kingdom	1991	5,500 households (~10,000 individuals)	Modeled on the US Panel Study of Income Dynamics PSID study
Building a New Life in Australia : The Longitudinal Study of Humanitarian Migrants (BNLA)	Cohort	Australia	2013	2,399	A longitudinal study of the settlement experience of humanitarian arrivals in Australia
Busselton Health Study	Panel	Australia	1966	10,000	–
Caerphilly Heart Disease Study	Cohort	United Kingdom	1979	2,512	Male subjects (Wales)
Canadian Longitudinal Study on Aging (CLSA-ÉLCV)	Cohort	Canada	2011	51,388	All research participants will be followed until 2033 or death.
Child Development Project	Cohort	United States	1987	585	Follows children recruited the year before they entered kindergarten in three US cities: Nashville and Knoxville, Tennessee, and Bloomington, Indiana
Children of Immigrants Longitudinal Study (CILS)	Cohort	United States	1992	5,262	Florida
Congenital Heart Surgeons' Society (CHSS)	Cohort	Canada	–	5,000	Various studies, managed by the Data Center Studies on Congenital Heart Diseases
Colombian Longitudinal Survey by Universidad de los Andes (ELCA)	Panel	Colombia	2010	15,363	Follows rural and urban households for increasing the comprehension of social and economic changes in Colombia
Copenhagen General Population Study (CGPS)	Cohort	Denmark	1976	170,000	The study is an ongoing prospective cohort study, that investigates the epidemiology of a wide range of diseases in a representative sample of the Danish population. Now integrated with and expanding upon the earlier and less extensive sister study, the Copenhagen City Heart Study.
Dunedin Multidisciplinary Health and Development Study	Cohort	New Zealand	1972	1,037	Participants born in Dunedin during 1972–73
Early Childhood Longitudinal Study (ECLS)		United States			
Study of migrants and squatters in Rio's Favelas	Cohort	Brazil	1968	n/a	The work of Janice Perlman, reported in her book Favela (2014)
Footprints in Time; the longitudinal study of Indigenous children	Cohort	Australia	2008	1,680	Study of Aboriginal and Torres Strait Islander children in selected locations across Australia
Fragile Families and Child Wellbeing Study	Cohort	United States	1998	n/a	Study being conducted in 20 cities
Framingham Heart Study	Cohort	United States	1948	5,209	Massachusetts
Genetic Studies of Genius	Cohort	United States	1921	1,528	The world's oldest and longest-running longitudinal study
Grant Study	Cohort	United States	1939	268	A 75-year longitudinal study of 268 physically and mentally healthy Harvard college sophomores from the classes of 1939–1944.
Growing Up in Australia; the longitudinal study of Australian children	Cohort	Australia	2004	10,000	–
Growing Up in Ireland (GUI)	Cohort	Ireland	2006	8,000 children 10,000 infants	Growing Up in Ireland is an Irish Government-funded study of children being carried out jointly by the Economic and Social Research Institute and Trinity College Dublin. The study started in 2006 and follows the progress of two groups of children: 8,000 9-year-olds (Child Cohort/Cohort '98) and 10,000 9-month-olds (Infant Cohort/Cohort '08).
Growing Up in New Zealand (GUiNZ)	Cohort	New Zealand	2009	6,846 children	GUiNZ is New Zealand's largest ongoing longitudinal study. It follows approximately 11% of all NZ children born between 2009 and 2010. The study aims to look in depth at the health and well-being of children (and their parents) growing up in NZ.
Growing Up in Scotland (GUS)	Cohort	Scotland	2003	14,000	–
Health and Retirement Study	Cohort	United States	1988	22,000	–
Household, Income and Labour Dynamics in Australia Survey	Panel	Australia	2001	25,000	–
Irish Longitudinal Study on Ageing (TILDA)	Cohort	Ireland	2009	8,500	Studies health, social and financial circumstances of the older Irish population
The Jyväskylä Longitudinal Study of Personality and Social Development, (JYLS)	Cohort	Finland	1968	369	The sample was drawn from 12 complete school classes. Data has been collected when the participants were 8, 14, 20, 27, 33, 36, 42 and 50 years old.
Life Paths into Early Adulthood (LifE Study)	Cohort	Germany	1979	3,000	Study tracks participants over an extended period to examine processes of development, education, socialization, and intergenerational transmission.
Longitudinal Study of Young People in England (Next Steps)	Cohort	England	2004	16,000	Large-scale panel study collecting information about young people of England aged 13 to 14 in 2004
Midlife in the United States	Cohort	United States	1983	6,500	–
Manitoba Follow-Up Study (MFUS)	Cohort	Canada	1948	3,983 men	Canada's largest and longest running investigation of cardiovascular disease and successful aging
Millennium Cohort Study (MCS)	Cohort	United Kingdom	2000	19,000	Study of child development, social stratification, and family life
Millennium Cohort Study	Cohort	United States	2000	200,000	Evaluation of long-term health effects of military service, including deployments
Minnesota Twin Family Study	Cohort	United States	1983	17,000 (8,500 twin pairs)	–
National Child Development Study (NCDS)	Cohort	United Kingdom	1958	17,000	–
National Educational Panel Study (NEPS)	Cohort	Germany	2009	60,000	Study on the development of competencies, educational processes, educational decisions, and returns to education in formal, nonformal, and informal contexts throughout the life span
National Longitudinal Surveys (NLS)	Cohort	United States	1979	12,686 (NLSY79), 9,000 (approx., NLSY97)	Includes four cohorts: NLSY79 (born 1957–64), NLSY97 (born 1980–84), NLSY79 Children and Young Adults, National Longitudinal Surveys of Young Women and Mature Women (NLSW)
National Longitudinal Survey of Children and Youth (NLSCY)	Cohort	Canada	1994	35,795	Inactive since 2009
National Health and Nutrition Examination Survey (NHANES)	Cohort	United States	1971	8,837 (since 1999)	Continual since 1999
Nature vs Nurture study	Cohort	United States	1960	11	Concluded in 1980. Controversial study by Peter B. Neubauer of twins and triplets separated at birth. Never published.
New Zealand Attitudes and Values Study	–	New Zealand	2009	n/a	–
Northern Ireland Longitudinal Study (NILS)	Panel	Northern Ireland	2006	500,000 (comprises about 28% of the Northern Ireland population and approximately 50% of households).	The NILS is a large-scale, representative data-linkage study created by linking data from the Northern Ireland Health Card Registration system to 1981, 1991, 2001 and 2011 census returns and to administrative data from other sources. These include vital events registered with the General Register Office for Northern Ireland (such as births, deaths, and marriages) and the Health Card registration system migration events data. The result is a 30-year-plus longitudinal data set which is regularly being updated. In addition to this rich resource, there is also the potential to link further Health and Social care data via distinct linkage projects (DLPs). The NILS is designed for statistics and research purposes only and is managed by the Northern Ireland Statistics and Research Agency under Census legislation. The data are de-identified at the point of use; access is only from within a strictly controlled 'secure environment' and governed by protocols and procedures to ensure data confidentiality.
Nurses' Health Study	Cohort	United States	1976	275,000	Most expensive and largest observational health study in history
ONS Longitudinal Study	Panel	England and Wales	1974 (data from 1971)	500,000 (1% sample of the population of England and Wales). The LS contains records on over 500,000 people usually resident in England and Wales at each point in time)	The sample comprises people born on one of four selected dates of birth and therefore makes up about 1% of the total population. The sample was initiated at the time of the 1971 Census, and the four dates were used to update the sample at the 1981,1991, 2001 and 2011 Censuses and in routine event registrations. Fresh LS members enter the study through birth and immigration and existing members leave through death and emigration. Thus, the LS represents a continuous sample of the population of England and Wales, rather than a sample taken at a one-time point only. It now includes records for over 950,000 study members. In addition to the census records, the individual LS records contain data for events such as deaths, births to sample mothers, emigrations and cancer registrations. Census information is also included for all people living in the same household as the LS member. The LS does not follow up household members in the same way from census to census. Support for potential users and more information available at CeLSIUS
Pacific Islands Families Study	Cohort	New Zealand	2000	1,398	–
Panel Study of Belgian Households	Panel	Belgium	1992	11,000	–
Panel Study of Income Dynamics	Panel	United States	1968	70,000	Possibly the oldest household longitudinal survey in the US
The Raine Study	Cohort	Australia	1989	5,768 (Gen1 + Gen2); 750 (Gen3); 100 (Gen0)	The Raine Study is based in Perth, Western Australia. It has followed the same group of pregnant women (Gen1) and their babies (Gen2) who were born into the study between 1989 and 1992. Its original aim was to investigate the benefits of more frequent ultrasound scans on infant health. It now studies the impact that early life factors (from the womb onwards) have on health throughout life. The Raine Study now includes 4 generations of cohort members.
Rotterdam Study	Cohort	Netherlands	1990	15,000	Focus is on inhabitants of Ommoord, a suburb of Rotterdam
Scottish Longitudinal Study (SLS)	Panel	Scotland	1991	274,000 (comprises 5.3% sample of the Scottish population, with records on approximately 274,000 individuals using 20 random birthdates)	The SLS is a large-scale linkage study built upon census records from 1991 onwards, with links to vital events (births, deaths, marriages, emigration); geographical and ecological data (deprivation indices, pollution, weather); primary and secondary education data (attendance, Schools Census, qualifications); and links to NHS Scotland ISD datasets, including cancer registrations, maternity records, hospital admissions, prescribing data and mental health admissions. The research potential is considerable. The SLS is a replica of the ONS Longitudinal Study but with a few key differences: sample size, commencement point and the inclusion of certain variables. The SLS is supported and maintained by the SLS Development & Support Unit with a safe-setting at the National Records of Scotland in Edinburgh. Further information and support for potential users is available at SLS-DSU
Seattle 500 Study	Cohort	United States	1974	500	Study of the effects of prenatal health habits on human development
Socio-Economic Panel (SOEP)	Panel	Germany	1984	12,000	–
Stirling County Study	Cohort	Canada	1952	639	Long-term study epidemiology of psychiatric disorders. Two cohorts were studied (575 from 1952 to 1970; 639 from 1970 to 1992).
Study of Health in Pomerania	Cohort	Germany	1997	15,000	Investigates common risk factors, sub-clinical disorders and manifest diseases in a high-risk population
Study of Mathematically Precocious Youth	Cohort	United States	1972	5,000	Follows highly intelligent people identified by age 13.
Survey of Health, Ageing, and Retirement in Europe (SHARE)	Panel	Europe	2002	120,000	Multidisciplinary and cross-national panel database of micro data on health, socio-economic status and social and family networks of individuals aged 50 or over
Study on Global Ageing and Adult Health (SAGE)	Cohort	International	2002	65,964	Studies the health and well-being of adult populations and the ageing process in six countries: China, Ghana, India, Mexico, Russian Federation and South Africa
Seattle Longitudinal Study	Cohort	United States	1956	6,000	–
Understanding Society: The UK Household Longitudinal Study	Panel	United Kingdom	2009	100,000	Incorporates the British Household Panel Study
Up Series	Cohort	United Kingdom	1964	14	Documentary film project by Michael Apted
Wisconsin Longitudinal Study	Cohort	United States	1957	10,317	Follows graduates from Wisconsin high schools in 1957

== See also ==
- Cross-sectional study
- Time series
- Panel analysis
- Repeated measures design
