= Fors =

Fors can mean:

- Fors, Deux-Sèvres, a French commune in the department of Deux-Sèvres
- Fors (Swedish village), a village in the Avesta Municipality in Dalarna County, Sweden
- Fors (Swedish parish), a parish in the Diocese of Härnösand, Sweden
- FORS, Transport for London's Freight Operator Recognition Scheme
- FORS, a measuring instrument installed on the Very Large Telescope
- FORS (Swiss Centre of Expertise in the Social Sciences)
- Sebastian Fors, a Swedish video game streamer
