= Gita Mishra =

Australian pidemiologist and academic

Gita Mishra AO
- Education: University of Auckland
- Scientific career
- Workplaces: University of Queensland; University of Cambridge; University College London
- Thesis: Multivariate analysis of data gathered from generally balanced designs (1996)

Gita Devi Mishra AO is an Australian epidemiologist who is Professor of Life Course Epidemiology and National Health and Medical Research Council Leadership Fellow at the University of Queensland. She is the director of the Australian Women and Girls’ Health Research Centre. She was awarded the 2022 Royal Australian and New Zealand College of Obstetricians and Gynaecologists Award for Excellence in Women’s Health.

== Early life and education ==
Mishra completed her doctoral research at the University of Auckland, where she studied medical statistics. Mishra was a scientific program leader at the Medical Research Council in Cambridge. She moved to University College London in 2004, where she spent three years as a Women’s Health Senior Research Fellow.

== Research and career ==
In 2010, Mishra joined the University of Queensland as a Professor of Life Course Epidemiology at the School of Public Health. She was awarded an Australian Research Council Future Fellowship in 2013, and made a National Health and Medical Research Council Leadership Fellow in 2022. In 2025, Mishra was awarded an Honorary Doctorate from Stockholm University.

Mishra founded the Queensland centre on Australian Women and Girls’ Health Research, where she leads long-term studies on women's health, including the Australian Longitudinal Study on Women's Health and the International collaboration for a Life course Approach to reproductive health and Chronic disease Events. These studies collect data on over 800,000 women in 12 countries, and provide comprehensive information on women's health around the world. She has studied the relationship between reproductive characteristics (from menarche to menopause) and disease (e.g. diabetes and cardiovascular disease).

Mishra developed the evidence for the 2020 National Women’s Health Strategy and the Queensland Women’s Health Forum.

Mishra is president of the 2025 World Congress of Endometriosis.

== Awards and honours ==
- 2017 Elected as a European Menopause and Andropause Society Board Member
- 2017 Honorary Membership of Sigma International
- 2017 Elected a Fellow of the Australian Academy of Health and Medical Sciences
- 2018 Leader of the Year Award
- 2022 Royal Australian and New Zealand College of Obstetricians and Gynaecologists Award for Excellence in Women’s Health
- 2024 Women's Agenda Women of 2024
- 2025 Honorary Doctorate by Stockholm University
- 2025 Officer of the Order of Australia

== Selected publications ==
- Peter H. Whincup; Samantha J Kaye; Christopher G Owen; et al. (1 December 2008). "Birth weight and risk of type 2 diabetes: a systematic review". JAMA. 300 (24): 2886–2897. doi:10.1001/jama.2008.886. ISSN 0098-7484. PMID 19109117. Wikidata Q37358400.
- Judith Stephenson; Nicola Heslehurst; Jennifer Hall; et al. (16 April 2018). "Before the beginning: nutrition and lifestyle in the preconception period and its importance for future health". The Lancet. 391 (10132): 1830–1841. doi:10.1016/s0140-6736(18)30311-8. ISSN 0140-6736. PMC 6075697. PMID 29673873. Wikidata Q52801834.
- Hong Ju; Mark Jones; Gita Mishra (26 November 2013). "The prevalence and risk factors of dysmenorrhea". Epidemiologic Reviews. 36: 104–113. doi:10.1093/epirev/mxt009. ISSN 0193-936X. PMID 24284871. Wikidata Q34388460.
