= Generations and Gender Survey =

The Generations and Gender Survey (GGS) is a series of panel surveys on families, life course trajectories and gender relations administered by the Generations and Gender Programme to improve demographic and social developments among several countries in Europe as well as Australia and Japan. The programme has collected at least one wave of surveys in more than 19 countries, with an average of 9,000 respondents per country. The importance of the GGS data is documented by its uptake in the research community, generating over 1,200 peer-reviewed publications. It was launched by the United Nations Economic Commission for Europe, as a successor to its previous Fertility and Family Survey in the 1990s.

The participating countries are Australia, Austria, Belarus, Belgium, Bulgaria, Czech Republic, Estonia, France, Georgia, Germany, Hungary, Italy, Japan, Kazakhstan, Lithuania, Netherlands, Norway, Poland, Romania, Russia, and Sweden. It does not include the United Kingdom, where, on the other hand, the UK households study has a similar scope.

== Survey content ==
The core questionnaire contains over 1,000 questions or items, broadly classified as follows:

- parent-child relationships
  - parent's perspective
  - child's perspective
- relationships between partners
  - partnership formation and dissolution
  - gender perspective
- complex partnership and fertility histories, stepfamilies
- contraception and infertility treatment
- household
- housing
- economic activity, income and wealth
- education
- health
- personal networks
- welfare state
- subjective well-being
- values
