= The Future of Children =

- Discipline: Social science
- Language: English
- Edited by: Sara McLanahan

Publication details
- History: 1991–2021
- Publisher: Princeton School of Public and International Affairs at Princeton University and The Brookings Institution (United States)
- Frequency: Biannually

Standard abbreviations
- ISO 4: Future Child.

Indexing
- ISSN: 1054-8289 (print); 1550-1558 (web)
- LCCN: 91650927
- JSTOR: 10548289
- OCLC no.: 795955382

Links
- Journal homepage; Online archive; ProjectMUSE (from 2005)

The Future of Children was a biannual academic journal published by the Princeton School of Public and International Affairs at Princeton University and the Brookings Institution. It focused on providing policy makers with the best available information about policies and programs regarding children. Publication ceased in 2021.
