= Survey on Household Income and Wealth =

The Survey on Household Income and Wealth (SHIW) is a statistical survey conducted by the Sample Surveys Division of the Banca d'Italia (the Italian central bank). The main objective of the SHIW is to study the economic behaviours of Italian households. In recent years the survey has been integrated in international research projects such as the Luxembourg Income Study and the Luxembourg Wealth Study, whose aim is to produce a comparable cross-national Data Archive on household income and wealth. Starting from 2008, the survey has also been part of a project conducted by the European Central Bank to produce a harmonized survey on household finances and consumption in the Euro area (Survey on Household Finance and Consumption).

== Methodology and scope ==
The sample size comprises about 8000 households selected from population registers. In order to analyse any changes in the phenomena under investigation, since 1989 about half of the sample has included households interviewed in previous surveys (panel households). Data collection is entrusted to a specialised company using professional interviewers and CAPI methodology.

The survey collects the following information:

- Characteristics of the household and of its members (number of income earners, gender, age, education, job status, and characteristics of the dwelling);
- Income: (wage and salaries, income from self-employment, pensions and other financial transfers, income from financial assets and real estates);
- Consumption and saving (food consumption, expenses for housing, health, insurance, spending on durable goods, and household saving);
- Wealth in terms of real estate, financial assets, liabilities;
- Special modules such as capital gains, inheritance, risk aversion, unpaid work, economic mobility, social capital, tax evasion, financial literacy.

Survey data from 1977 to 2014 are freely available for research purposes on the Banca d'Italia’s website (formats: ASCII, SAS and Stata).

== Main uses ==
The main uses of the survey are:

- for research projects linked to the functions of the Banca d'Italia;
- for ex-ante evaluation of economic policies through microsimulation models such as Euromod and Econlav;
- for academic research;
- to improve the information coming from macro statistics such as National Accounts.

The main results of the SHIW are diffused through the Supplements of the Statistical Bulletin.

== See also ==
- British Household Panel Survey (BHPS)
- Household, Income and Labour Dynamics in Australia Survey (HILDA)
- Panel Study of Income Dynamics (PSID)
- Socio-Economic Panel (SOEP)
- Survey of Consumer Finances (SCF)
