= Jeanne Brooks-Gunn =

American developmental psychologist

- Born: 1946 (age 78–79); Bethesda, Maryland, U.S.
- Education: Connecticut College (BA); Harvard University (EdM); University of Pennsylvania (PhD)
- Occupation: Professor of Psychology

Jeanne Brooks-Gunn (born 1946, in Bethesda, Maryland) is an American developmental psychologist and professor. She is currently the Virginia and Leonard Marx Professor of Child Development at Teachers College, Columbia University.

== Education ==
Brooks-Gunn received her B.A in psychology at Connecticut College in 1969. She went to graduate school at Harvard University where she obtained her Ed.M in Human Learning and Development in 1970. Brooks-Gunn continued her studies the University of Pennsylvania, receiving her Ph.D. in human learning and development under the supervision of Michael Lewis.

== Career ==
Brooks-Gunn is the Virginia and Leonard Marx Professor of Child Development at Columbia University, in both Teachers College and the College of Physicians and Surgeons at Columbia University where she is co-director of the National Center for Children and Families at Teachers College, Columbia University. Her current studies include the Fragile Families and Child Wellbeing Study, Project on Human Development in Chicago Neighborhoods, and Early Head Start.

Brooks-Gunn has written numerous books and edited volumes, and has published over 500 articles. Her work focuses on neighborhood poverty, growing up poor, and adolescent mothers.

Brooks-Gunn's work led to increased understanding of the influence of parents and schools on child development. Her books exposed how children raised in poverty experience more negative cognitive and educational outcomes than more affluent children. She has led programs for children and parents, holding meetings that aim to better the lives of children and youth. Her programs include home visiting for pregnant women and mothers-to-be, early childhood educational programs for children of ages 12 to 36 months, and after-school programs for older children.

=== Representative work ===
In one of her books, Brooks-Gunn and colleagues focused on developmental outcomes for adolescent mothers and their children in relation to school, work, the presence of the baby's father is in their lives, and other factors. In another study, Brooks-Gunn and colleagues focused on the epidemic of obesity which many people suffer from today, including young children. They predicted racial/ethnic differences in obesity in a sample of 3-year-olds from low income families. They found evidence of obesity start at age three, with children of obese mothers having a higher chance of being overweight, and with heightened risk of obesity among Hispanic children.

Another study compared behavioral problems associated with acting out in children growing up in a single parent versus dual parent households. Child behavioral outcomes were associated with parental resources, parental mental health, parental relationship quality, parenting quality, and father involvement. Children coming from so-called "fragile families" fared worse than those with more stable family structures.

== Awards and honours ==
Brooks-Gunn received the APA Award for Distinguished Contributions to Research in Public Policy in 2002 for contributions to helping children, youth, and families. She offered solutions to family problems through interventions and programs for families of different backgrounds to provide them with the needed resources for a better future. She has also been awarded the James McKeen Cattell Fellow Award from the Association for Psychological Science, the Urie Bronfenbrenner Award for Lifetime Contribution to Developmental Psychology in the Service of Science and Society from the American Psychological Association, the Distinguished Contributions to the Public Policy for Children Award from the Society for Research in Child Development, the Hill Award for Excellence in Theory Development and Research on Adolescents from the Society for Research on Adolescence, and the Harvard University Graduate School of Education Alumni Council Award.

She is a member of the National Academy of Education and the National Academy of Medicine, and a fellow of the American Academy of Arts and Sciences, the American Association for the Advancement of Science, the American Psychological Association, and the New York Academy of Science. In 2009, she received an honorary doctorate in science from Northwestern University.
