= Westat =

Professional services research corporation

- Type: Employee-owned
- Industry: Professional services
- Founded: 1963
- Headquarters: Bethesda, Maryland, United States
- Number of locations: 13
- Key people: Renee F. Slobasky (Chair of the Board); Scott Royal (CEO and President)
- Products: WesVar, Blaise
- Services: Research in the fields of health, education, social policy, and transportation
- Revenue: 500.7 million USD (FY2016)
- Number of employees: Over 1,900
- Website: www.westat.com

Westat is an employee-owned professional services corporation located in Bethesda, Maryland. It provides research services to government agencies and businesses and conducts research studies in behavioral health and health policy, clinical trials, education, public health and epidemiology, social policy and economics and transportation.

== History ==
Westat Inc. began as a partnership in 1961 with co-founders Edward C. Bryant, a University of Wyoming statistics professor, and two former students, James Daley and Donald King. In 1963, the company was incorporated. Bryant served as the company's first president until 1978 when Joseph Hunt took over as president for the next 32 years.

In 1978, the company established the Employee Stock Ownership Plan (ESOP), which allowed employees to own stock in the company.

In 1981, Westat moved to its location in Rockville, Maryland.

In May 2011, James E. Smith, became president and CEO of the company. Graham Kalton, stepped down as chairman of the board in 2019, and was replaced by Smith. Scott Royal, became the CEO and President of the company in March 2020.

In June 2023, Renee F. Slobasky succeeded Smith as board chair.

On December 1, 2025 Westat moved to its current location in Bethesda, Maryland.

=== Acquisitions ===
Westat acquired Geostats, a research and technology company, in November 2012.

In 2015, Westat acquired education research and technical assistance specialist, Edvance Research, and information technology solutions company Fenestra. Healthcare data analytics firm, JEN Associates, was acquired in February 2018. The acquisitions were for an undisclosed amount.

In June 2022, the company acquired Insight Policy Research (Insight) which operates as a wholly owned subsidiary of Westat, known as 'Westat Insight'.

== Research activities ==
Westat conducts studies on respondent knowledge, attitudes, and behaviors, program evaluation, physical, mental, and behavioral health, academic achievement and literacy, early childhood longitudinal studies, child abuse and neglect, medical treatments and outcomes, exposure assessments, and information management and communications solutions.

Westat developed a software package, Wesvar, that can be used to analyse data from surveys. and distributes the Blaise survey data analysis package in the Americas.

The company has a life sciences division that provides contract research support for clinical trials for the biopharmaceutical industry.

The company conducted an analysis of pedestrian deaths for the Governors Highway Safety Association (GHSA), in April 2022.

== Recognition and claims ==
Westat was the recipient of the Policy Impact Award by the American Association for Public Opinion Research in 2011 and 2014, for survey work that informed the Senate debate which led to the repeal of "Don't Ask Don't Tell" and for the National Prison Rape Statistics Program as one of the contractors to U.S. Bureau of Justice Statistics (BJS), respectively.

In September 2014, Department of Labor's Office of Federal Contract Compliance Programs discovered, during a scheduled audit of Westat, that the company systematically failed to provide equal employment opportunities to women applicants and applicants with other ethnicities for various positions between the period of October 2008 to September 2009. Under the terms of the settlement, Westat paid $1,500,000 in back wages and interest to all affected applicants, made 113 job offers to the original class members as positions become available, corrected record-keeping violations and conducted internal audits.
