= Swiss Centre of Expertise in the Social Sciences =

Facility in Lausanne, Switzerland

The Swiss Centre of Expertise in the Social Sciences (FORS) is a national research infrastructure, created in 2008. FORS is financed by the Swiss State Secretariat for Education and Research, the Swiss National Science Foundation, and the University of Lausanne. Its purpose is to provide services to the social science research community, to conduct research, and to publish and disseminate research findings.

The activities of the FORS specifically comprise the following:

- conducting national and international surveys on social and political topics;
- documenting and providing datasets of all kinds for secondary analyses;
- enhancing methods and procedures for survey research;
- advising researchers.

The FORS integrates infrastructures and research projects like the Swiss Household Panel (SHP), the Swiss Electoral Studies (Selects), the Social Report, and the current Data and Research Information Services (DARIS).

In addition, the FORS organises teaching and learning events, including the annual Swiss Summer School on Methods in the Social Sciences, monthly seminars on research methodology (in collaboration with social science faculty partners (MISC and IMA), workshops at Swiss universities and universities of applied sciences, as well as international conferences. FORS also offers a data portal to public statistics—COMPASS.

FORS and its staff collaborate widely with different players in the social sciences, in Switzerland and abroad.

== Partner Institutions, Organisations, and Infrastructures ==
- Council of European Social Science Data Archives (CESSDA)
- Cross-National Equivalent File (CNEF)
- European Social Survey (ESS)
- European Strategy Forum on Research Infrastructures (ESFRI)
- European Survey Research Association (ESRA)
- International Social Survey Program (ISSP)
- Leibniz Institute for the Social Sciences (GESIS)
- Réseau Quételet - French Data Archives for Social Sciences
- State Secretariat for Education and Research (SER)
- Survey of Health, Ageing and Retirement in Europe (SHARE)
- Swiss Academy of Humanities and Social Sciences (ASSH)
- Swiss Federal Statistical Office (SFSO)
- Swiss National Science Foundation (SNSF)
