= Seattle 500 Study =

The Seattle 500 Study is a University of Washington study that tracks individuals from birth. It is a longitudinal prospective study of the effects of prenatal health habits on human development. Beginning in 1974, this study has continuously followed a birth cohort of approximately 500 offspring. Current data collection is aimed at studying the development of mental health problems and problems of alcohol/drug abuse and dependence and their pre and post-natal antecedents.

The data which Seattle 500 collects is the basis of other research.
