= Australian Longitudinal Study on Women's Health =

Population-based health survey in Australia

The Australian Longitudinal Study on Women's Health (ALSWH), also known as Women's Health Australia, is an ongoing population-based survey examining the health of over 50,000 Australian women. The study is funded by the Australian Government Department of Health and is a collaborative endeavour conducted by staff and investigators at The University of Newcastle and The University of Queensland. The current directors are Professor Gita Mishra (The University of Queensland) and Professor Deborah Loxton (The University of Newcastle).

== Method ==
In 1996, women in three age groups (born 1973–78, 1946–51 and 1921–26) were randomly selected from the national Medicare database. These women were sent an invitation by mail to participate in the study. Over 40,000 women responded and agreed to participate. These women represented 2-3% of women in their age groups living in urban, rural and remote areas of Australia at that time.

In 2012–13, an additional cohort of women aged 18–23 (born 1989–95) was recruited. 17,012 women were recruited using various methods, including social media, traditional media, and peer referral, with the use of incentives.

The primary method of data collection employed by ALSWH is self-completed surveys. ALSWH also includes a qualitative data set, where participants are asked to write anything they feel is important to their health and wellbeing in a free response space at the end of the survey.

== Scope ==
The ALSWH study assesses:

- Physical and mental health (including well-being, major diagnoses and symptoms, determinants and consequences of chronic disease)
- Use of health services (general practitioners, specialist and other visits, access and satisfaction, cultural appropriateness)
- Health behaviours and risk factors (weight and exercise, diet and eating disorders, body image, smoking, alcohol and other drugs)
- Time use (including paid and unpaid work, family roles, leisure, social support, aspirations and financial resources)
- Socio-demographic factors (location, education, employment and family composition)
- Violence (physical and sexual abuse, intimate partner violence, harassment, psychological and abuse of older women)
- Life stages and key events (such as childbirth, menopause, major illness, falls and fractures, divorce, widowhood, dementia and bereavement).

== Substudies ==
As well as completing the main surveys, participants are occasionally invited to participate in substudies that aim to examine selected issues in more depth. A wide range of topics has been covered, including:

- Endometriosis
- Mothers and children's health
- Sleeping difficulties and disturbances
- Domestic violence
- Urinary incontinence
- Retirement
- Caring
- Breast cancer
- Experiences of motherhood
- Future plans of young women
- Alcohol use during pregnancy
- Weight change at menopause
- Prenatal and postnatal depression
- Menopausal symptoms and diet
- Contraception
- Adverse pregnancy outcomes – miscarriage, preterm delivery and stillbirth.

== Data linkage ==
ALSWH has approval to anonymously link survey data with a number of national and state-based administrative datasets. Currently these approvals include the National Death Index, Medicare data, state-based cancer registries, perinatal data collections and hospital admission datasets. The aim of linking to these datasets is to provide new insights into the health and health service use of Australian women, taking into account individual level differences in socioeconomic, behavioural, environmental and other risk factors. In the context of a changing health system, it is important to be able to monitor and evaluate the impact and outcomes of health service policy and practice.

== Outcomes ==
The longitudinal study design ensures that the same women are followed over many years so researchers can observe changes in their health, clarify cause-and-effect relationships, and assess the effects of changes in policy and practice. ALSWH can provide information about the health of women across the lifespan. This information has assisted federal and state governments to plan for the future and to develop and evaluate health policy and practice relevant to Australian women. The study was used extensively in the 2010 National Women's Health Policy and the National Women's Health Strategy 2020–2030.

ALSWH has collaborated with numerous investigators, universities and organisations around the world. The findings from ALSWH have been reported in over 100 reports to the government, and been included in more than 1000 academic publications.
