= Sara McLanahan =

American sociologist (1940–2021)

Sarah McLanahan
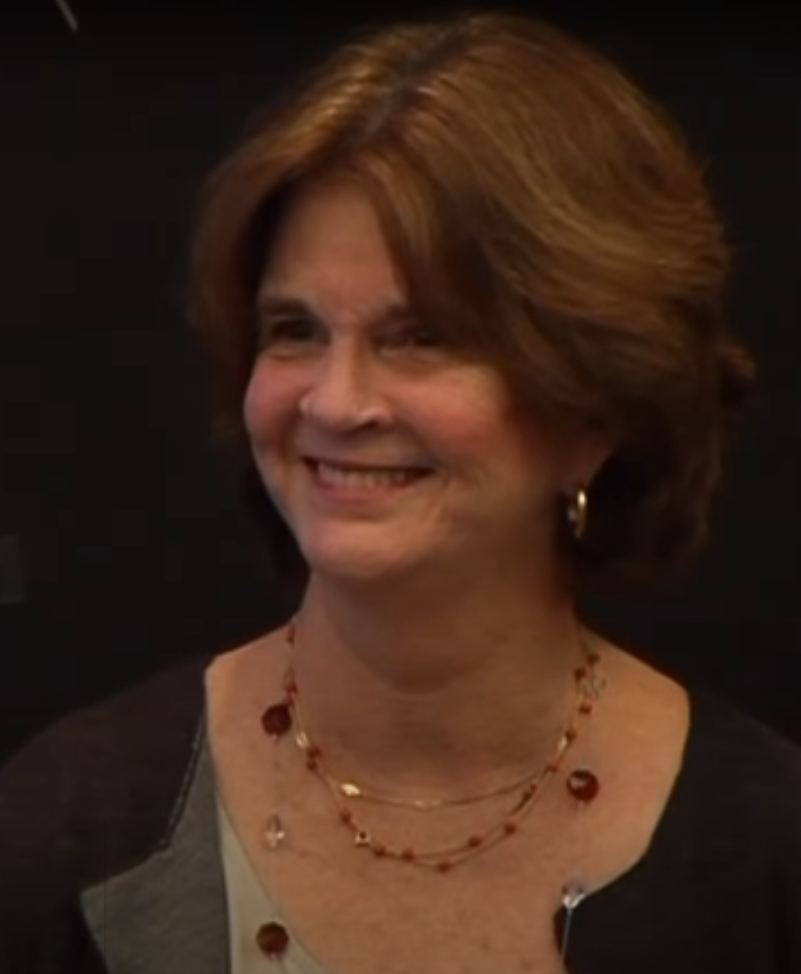
- McLanahan delivering a lecture
- Born: Sara Frances Smith; December 27, 1940; Tyler, Texas, U.S.
- Died: December 31, 2021 (aged 81); Manhattan, New York, U.S.
- Awards: American Academy of Arts and Sciences Fellow of 2019

Academic background
- Education: University of Houston, University of Texas

Academic work
- Institutions: Princeton University, University of Wisconsin
- Main interests: motherhood, marriage, divorce, family structure, children, social stratification
- Website: https://sociology.princeton.edu/people/sara-mclanahan

Sara McLanahan (née Smith; December 27, 1940 – December 31, 2021) was an American sociologist. She is known for her work on the family as a major institution in the American stratification system. Her early work examined the consequences of divorce and remarriage for parents and children, and her later work focused on families formed by unmarried parents. She was interested in the effects of family structure on social inequality and the roles that public policies can play in addressing the needs of families and children.

== Early life and education ==
Sara Frances Smith was born on 27 December 1940 in Tyler, Texas. After graduating from Bennet Junior College in 1959 with highest honors, McLanahan attended Smith College from 1961 to 1962. She married Ellery McLanahan in 1962 and divorced in 1972.

She continued her education at the University of Houston where she received an undergraduate degree in sociology. She went on to earn her PhD in sociology from the University of Texas at Austin while a single parent to her three children, Sara, Ellery, and Anna. She then completed a postdoctoral fellowship at the department of psychiatry at the University of Wisconsin. In 1982, she married Irv Garfinkel, then Professor and Director of the Poverty Institute, with whom she frequently collaborated for the following four decades.

== Career ==
McLanahan was the William S. Tod Professor of Sociology and Public Affairs at Princeton University. She previously taught at the University of Wisconsin.

At Princeton, McLanahan was the founding director of the Bendheim-Thoman Center for Research on Child Wellbeing. She was also a cofounder, with Dr. Garfinkel and Ron Mincy, of the Fragile Families and Child Wellbeing Study, director of the Education Research Section, and director of the Joint Degree Program in Social Policy.

McLanahan was editor-in-chief of the journal The Future of Children and a trustee of the Russell Sage Foundation. She served as president of the Population Association of America in 2004, was elected a fellow of the American Academy of Political and Social Science in 2005, and, in 2011, was elected to the National Academy of Sciences. She was elected a member of the American Philosophical Society in 2016.

McLanahan published more than 125 research articles, 59 book chapters, and 7 books and edited volumes. More than 915 articles have been published which rely on data from the Fragile Families and Child Wellbeing Study, which she co-founded with her husband, Irv Garfinkel. McLanahan died of lung cancer on 31 December 2021 at her residence in Manhattan, New York.

== Honors and awards ==
She was elected as an American Academy of Arts and Sciences Fellow in 2019.

== Selected works ==
- "Vol. 25, No. 2, FALL 2015 of The Future of Children on JSTOR". www.jstor.org.
- McLanahan, Sara; Tach, Laura; Schneider, Daniel (2013). "The Causal Effects of Father Absence". Annual Review of Sociology. 39 (1): 399–427. doi:10.1146/annurev-soc-071312-145704. ISSN 0360-0572. PMC 3904543. PMID 24489431.
- "Vol. 20, No. 2, FALL 2010 of The Future of Children on JSTOR". www.jstor.org.
- McLanahan, Sara (2009). "Fragile Families and the Reproduction of Poverty". The Annals of the American Academy of Political and Social Science. 621 (1): 111–131. doi:10.1177/0002716208324862. ISSN 0002-7162. PMC 2831755. PMID 20204078.
- McLanahan, Sara; Percheski, Christine (2008). "Family Structure and the Reproduction of Inequalities". Annual Review of Sociology. 34 (1): 257–276. doi:10.1146/annurev.soc.34.040507.134549. ISSN 0360-0572.
- Meadows, Sarah O.; McLanahan, Sara S.; Brooks-Gunn, Jeanne (2008). "Stability and Change in Family Structure and Maternal Health Trajectories". American Sociological Review. 73 (2): 314–334. doi:10.1177/000312240807300207. ISSN 0003-1224. PMC 2843941. PMID 20333277.
- Carlson, Marcia; McLanahan, Sara; England, Paula (2004). "Union Formation in Fragile Families". Demography. 41 (2): 237–261. doi:10.1353/dem.2004.0012. ISSN 1533-7790. PMC 3169423. PMID 15209039.
- McLanahan, Sara (2004). "Diverging Destinies: How Children Are Faring Under the Second Demographic Transition". Demography. 41 (4): 607–627. doi:10.1353/dem.2004.0033. ISSN 1533-7790. PMID 15622946. S2CID 6063666.
- McLanahan, Sara; Sandefur, Gary D. (1994). Growing up with a single parent : what hurts, what helps. Cambridge, Massachusetts. ISBN 0-674-36407-4. LCCN 94019995. OCLC 30474392. OL 1095466M.
- Garfinkel, Irwin; McLanahan, Sara; Irv Garfinkel (1986). Single mothers and their children : a new American dilemma. Washington, D.C.: Urban Institute Press. ISBN 0-87766-404-8. LCCN 86023413. OCLC 14240910. OL 2729409M.
- McLanahan, Sara (1985). "Family Structure and the Reproduction of Poverty". American Journal of Sociology. 90 (4): 873–901. doi:10.1086/228148. ISSN 0002-9602. S2CID 143515771.
