= Jane Waldfogel =

American social economist

Jane Waldfogel FBA is an American social economist and the Compton Foundation Centennial Professor of Social Work for the Prevention of Children's and Youth Problems at Columbia University. Her research focuses on work-family policies, improving the measurement of poverty, and understanding social mobility across countries and child welfare. She has published studies about the impact of public policies on child and family well-being.

== Education and career ==
Waldfogel received her B.A. from Radcliffe College in 1976, her M.Ed. from the Harvard Graduate School of Education in 1979, and her Ph.D. in public policy from the Kennedy School of Government at Harvard University in 1994.

She was elected as a Corresponding Fellow of the British Academy in 2015.
