= British Household Panel Survey =

Survey

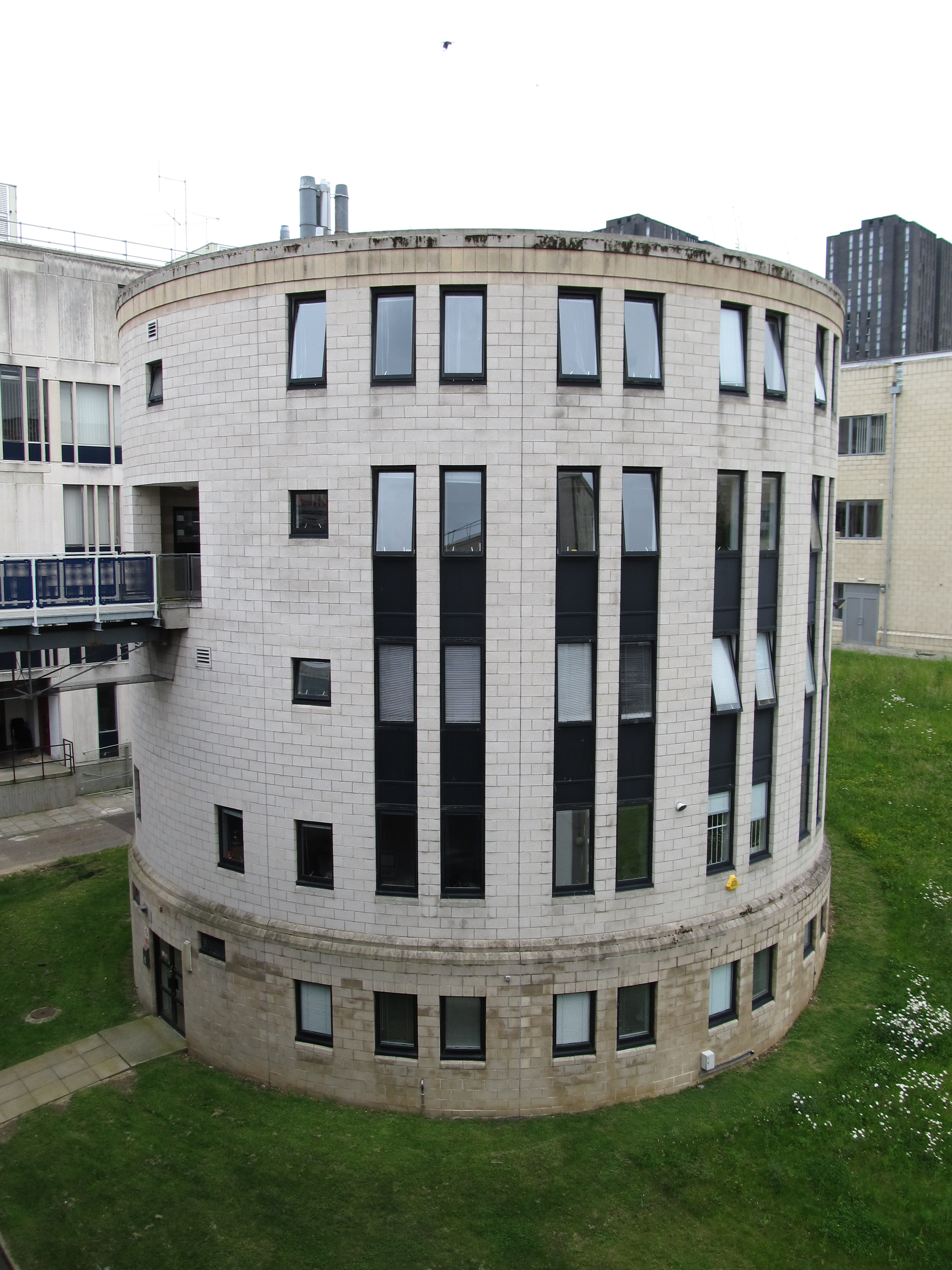
The Rab Butler Building contained the offices of the British Household Panel Survey from 1992 until 2007

The British Household Panel Survey (BHPS), carried out at the Institute for Social and Economic Research of the University of Essex, is a survey for social and economic research. A sample of British households was drawn and first interviewed in 1991. The members of these original households have since been followed and annually interviewed. The resulting data base is very popular among social scientists for quantitative analyses of social and economic change. One of the most important precursors of the BHPS is the Panel Study of Income Dynamics (PSID), established in the 1960s at the University of Michigan, Ann Arbor (US). The initial BHPS sample consisted of 10,300 individuals across Great Britain. Additional samples were recruited in Scotland and Wales in 1999 and the study was extended to Northern Ireland in 2001.

As a panel survey it is a form of longitudinal study. The BHPS was funded by the Economic and Social Research Council from its inception in 1989 until 2008. Since 2008, the BHPS has been integrated into Understanding Society: the UK Household Longitudinal Study, still run from ISER.

BHPS data are integrated into the European Community Household Panel and the Cross National Equivalent File (CNEF) which contains panel data from Australia, Canada, Germany, Great Britain and the United States.

== See also ==
- Canadian Survey of Labour and Income Dynamics (SLID)
- German Socio-Economic Panel (SOEP)
- Household, Income and Labour Dynamics in Australia Survey (HILDA)
- Panel Study of Income Dynamics (PSID)
- Survey on Household Income and Wealth (SHIW)
