= Longitudinal Study of Young People in England =

The Longitudinal Study of Young People in England (LSYPE), also known as "Next Steps", is a large-scale panel study collecting information about the young people of England, aged 13 to 14 in 2004.

== History ==
The study combines data from a wide range of different sources such as the National Pupil Database (NPD) or the 2001 Census. So far, six waves of the study have been conducted, the sixth edition being released in August 2009. The first four waves of the study were undertaken for the Department for Children, Schools and Families (DCSF) by a consortium of contractors including BMRB Social Research, GfK NOP and Ipsos MORI.

The purpose of the study is to identify the key issues that influence the lives of young people in England in hindsight to their progress in the transition from compulsory education to the entry in the labour market or other outcomes. The findings are meant to evaluate the success of certain policies as well as providing help with further policy development.

Amongst the main topics covered by the study are household and demographic information, languages spoken in the home, attitudes towards school and involvement in education, year 10 subject choices, special educational needs, parental expectations and aspirations, family activities, etc.

== Methodology and scope ==
The sample of the first wave consisted of about 21,000 young people aged 13 to 14 who were in Year 9 in February 2004. Fieldwork was carried out in the form of face-to-face interviews, supplemented by linkage to administrative records. Interviews were conducted with the young person as well as the main parent or carer.

== Survey results ==
Recently published research includes, amongst others, the paper "Minority Ethnic Pupils in the Longitudinal Study of Young People in England" which can be downloaded here.

== Re-using the data ==
The data and additional study information are available on the Economic and Social Data Service (ESDS) website . Users will have to register in order to access the download section.
