= Household, Income and Labour Dynamics in Australia Survey =

The Household, Income and Labour Dynamics in Australia Survey (HILDA) is an Australian household-based longitudinal study which began in 2001. It has been used for examining a wide variety of economic, social, health and other issues, examples of which include: the incidence of persistent poverty; assets and income in the transition to retirement; the correlates and impact of changes in physical and mental health; the social and health impacts of climate change; and an international comparison of wealth and happiness. The survey is widely used by Australian and international researchers in the fields of economics, social science, health and social policy and by the Australian Government. The HILDA survey is managed by a small team in the Melbourne Institute of Applied Economic and Social Research at the University of Melbourne. The inaugural director of the study was Professor Mark Wooden, who served in the role from 2000 to 2023. It is currently led by Nicole Watson and Roger Wilkins. The fieldwork was carried out by ACNielsen from 2001 to 2009 and has since been carried out by Roy Morgan Research. The survey is funded by the Australian Government through the Department of Social Services.

HILDA has the following key features:

- It collects information about economic and subjective well-being, labour market dynamics and family dynamics.
- Special questionnaire modules are included each wave and have covered topics such as wealth, retirement and fertility intentions.
- The wave 1 panel consisted of 7,682 households and 19,914 individuals. In wave 11 this was topped up with an additional 2,153 households and 5,477 individuals
- Interviews are conducted annually with all adult members of each household. Children are interviewed once they turn 15.
- The panel members are followed over time.
- Funding has been guaranteed for 25 waves, and the survey is expected to continue beyond wave 25.
- Each release of the data typically occurs at the start of December each year. The release in December 2023 was for data collected from 2001 (wave 1) to 2022 (wave 22).

HILDA data, when weighted, describe the Australian population, although homeless people and recent immigrants are under-represented. The datasets (PSPP/SPSS, SAS and Stata files) are available for legitimate research purposes and application can be made from the Australian Data Archive. The data are confidentialised by suppression of geographic and other identifying information. A bibliography of published research, the survey methodology, the questionnaires and a user manual are available from the Melbourne Institute's HILDA website.

== See also ==
- Panel Study of Income Dynamics (PSID), USA
- Socio-Economic Panel (SOEP), Germany
- Survey on Household Income and Wealth (SHIW), Italy
- Understanding Society: the UK Household Longitudinal Study (UKHLS) (formerly British Household Panel Survey (BHPS), UK)
