= Early Childhood Longitudinal Study =

The Early Childhood Longitudinal Study (ECLS) program provides data about the development of children in the United States. It is carried out by the Institute of Education Sciences. It provides data on children's status at birth and at various points thereafter. The ECLS program also provides data to analyze the relationships among a wide range of family, school, community, and individual variables with children's development, early learning, and performance in school.
