= Socio-Economic Panel =

Dataset of the population in Germany

Coordinates: 52°30′44″N 13°23′19.32″E

Socio-Economic Panel (SOEP)
- Established: 1984
- Faculty: Sociology, Economic, etc.
- Address: Sozio-oekonomisches Panel (SOEP); DIW Berlin; Anton-Wilhelm-Amo-Straße 58. 10117 Berlin – Germany
- Location: Berlin, Germany
- Website: diw.de/en/soep

The German Socio-Economic Panel (SOEP [/'zœp/], for Sozio-oekonomisches Panel) is a longitudinal panel dataset of the population in Germany. It is a household based study which started in 1984 and which reinterviews adult household members annually. Additional samples have been taken from time to time. In 2015, there will be about 14,000 households, and more than 30,000 adult persons sampled. Some of the many topics surveyed include household composition, occupation, employment, earnings, health and life satisfaction. The annual surveys are conducted by the German Institute for Economic Research (DIW Berlin) and the Kantar Group. The survey is funded by the German Federal Government and the State of Berlin via the «Bund-Länder-Kommission» (State/Federal State Commission) for Educational Planning and Research Promotion.

Data are available to social science researchers in Germany and abroad in SPSS/PSPP, SAS/DAP, Stata, R/S-PLUS and ASCII format. Extensive documentation in English and German is available online.

SOEP data are integrated into the Cross National Equivalent File (CNEF) which contains panel data from Australia, Canada, Germany, Great Britain and the United States. The data distribution of the SOEP for researchers outside Germany is supplied with the CNEF by a group at Ohio State University. Application to use this international distribution has to be made to the DIW Berlin.

== Subsamples ==
SOEP Subsamples 2017
Sample		Start-Year	Households	Persons	Description
A	West-German (residents)	1984	n=4,528	n=12,245	Head is either German or other nationality than those in Sample B
B	Foreigners	1984	n=1,393	n=12,245	Head is either Turkish, Italian, Spanish, Greek or from the former Yugoslavia
German reunification
C	East-Germans	1990	n=2,179	n=4,453	Head was a citizen of the GDR (expansion of survey territory)
D	Immigrants	1994/1995	n=522	n=1,078	At least one household member has moved to Germany after 1989 (expansion of survey population)
E	Refreshment	1998	n=1,067	n=1,923	Random sample covering all existing subsamples (total population)
F	Innovation	2000	n=6,052	n=10,890	Random sample covering all existing subsamples (total population)
G	High Income	2002	n=1,224	n=2,671	Monthly net household income is more than Euro 4,500 (7.500 DM)
H	Refreshment	2006	n=1,506	n=2,616	Random sample covering all existing subsamples (total population)
I	Incentive/Refreshment	2009	n=1,531	n=2,509	Random sample covering all existing subsamples (total population). Since 2011 it is no longer a part of the SOEP Core study. It is now a part of the new SOEP Innovation Study.
J	Refreshment	2011	n=3,136	n=5,161	Random sample covering all existing subsamples (total population)
K	Refeshment	2012	n=1,526	n=2,473	Random sample covering all existing subsamples (total population)
L1	Cohort Sample (2007–2010)	2010	n=2,074	n=7,670	part of the study "Families in Germany" (FiD), at least one household member born between January 2007 and March 2010
L2	Family Types I	2010	n=2,500	n=8,838	part of the study "Families in Germany" (FiD), at least one of the criteria: single parents, low-income families, and large families with three or more children
L3	Family Types II	2011	n=924	n=3,579	part of the study "Families in Germany" (FiD), at least one of the criteria: single parents, large families with three or more children
M1	Migration (1995–2010)	2013	n=2,732	n=7,445	Immigrated to Germany after 1995 or second-generation immigrants
M2	Migration (2009–2013)	2015	n=1,096	n=2,638	Immigrated to Germany between 2009 and 2013
M3/4	Refugee Sample	2016	n=3,320	n=9,965	Entering Germany between January 2013 and December 2016 with asylum application
M5	Refugee Sample	2017	n=1,519	n=4,161	Entering Germany between January 2013 and December 2016 with asylum application
N	Refresher Sample (PIAAC-L)	2017	n=2,314	n=4,807	Former participants of the PIAAC study

== See also ==
- Canadian Survey of Labour and Income Dynamics (SLID)
- Cross-National Equivalent File (CNEF)
- Household, Income and Labour Dynamics in Australia Survey (HILDA)
- Panel Study of Income Dynamics (PSID)
- Swiss Household Panel (SHP) (URL:last access 2013-05-28)
- LISS panel (LISS)
- Survey on Household Income and Wealth (SHIW)
- UK households: a longitudinal study (UKHLS) / Understanding Society, UK
  - formerly British Household Panel Survey (BHPS), UK
