= Understanding Society: the UK Household Longitudinal Study =

Panel survey in the UK

Understanding Society, the UK Household Longitudinal Study (UKHLS), is one of the largest panel surveys in the world, supporting social and economic research. Its sample size is 40,000 households from the United Kingdom or approximately 100,000 individuals.

== Structure ==
Data collection, or fieldwork, began in January 2009. Study participants are interviewed annually and the Study follows participants as their households change and evolve. The fieldwork period is 24 months, but each person is still interviewed annually, i.e., the fieldwork for consecutive waves overlap. Interviews are via a web-survey or a face-to-face survey with an interviewer.

The study is funded by the Economic and Social Research Council, a consortium of UK Government departments and the British Academy. Understanding Society is led by the Institute for Social and Economic Research (ISER) at the University of Essex.

As a panel survey, Understanding Society is a form of longitudinal study. The survey consists of information about the same individuals at regular intervals and so can be used to track changes in people's lives and attitudes over time. It can also be used to measure phenomena such as poverty persistence, unemployment duration, duration of marriage or cohabitation and analyze the factors that affect these durations. The study allows for deeper analysis of a wide range of sections of the population as they respond to regional, national and international change. Understanding Society will enhance our insight into the pathways that influence peoples longer term occupational trajectories; their health and well-being, their financial circumstances and personal relationships.

From its second wave (starting in 2010) Understanding Society incorporates the British Household Panel Survey, which was carried out at ISER since 1991.

Understanding Society has several key features which make it particularly valuable for studying the UK population:

It covers all ages: allowing researchers to understand the experiences of the whole population over time. Understanding Society has a special questionnaire for children aged 10–15 and an adult survey for participants aged 16 and over. There is continuous data collection - annual interviews mean that short- and long-term changes in people's lives can be investigated. The whole household contributes - information is collected on everyone in a household so that inter-relations between generations, couples and siblings can be explored. There is national, regional and local data - all four countries of the UK are included, allowing researches to compare the experiences of people in different places and in different policy contexts. It's multi-topic - Understanding Society covers a wide range of social, economic and behavioural factors making it relevant to a wide range of researchers and policy makers. There is an ethnic minority boost sample - allowing the experiences of specific ethnic minority groups to be investigated. The Study includes biomarkers and genetic data - data collected by nurses to measure people's health allows researchers to understand the relationship between social and economic circumstances and health. It can be linked to administrative data - Study data can be linked (with consent) to administrative records from other sources, building a richer picture of households.

This study also has a methodological sample called the Innovation Panel which is conducted in the year prior to the main survey to enable research in key methodological issues such as the quality of new questions, methods to improve response rates, mode effects. This sample consists of 1500 households.

== Data available to date ==
- Main stage Waves 1-8
- Innovation Panel Waves 1-11

Understanding Society data are available from the UK Data Service.

== Topics covered by Understanding Society ==
Understanding Society collects information on a wide range of social, economic, health and attitudinal topics. The Study asks questions about:

- Income, wealth and savings
- Finances and spending
- Health and wellbeing
- Education, work and training
- Family and partnerships
- Origins, nationality and ethnic identity
- Childcare and other caring responsibilities
- Transport
- Environmental behaviour
- Social and political attitudes
- Life satisfaction, community and leisure

More information on the topics covered by Understanding Society can be found in the long term content plan.

== Applications ==
Understanding Society gives an overview of the social, economic and health factors that affect the population of the UK. The Study highlights the links between the different facets of life and provides evidence on change and stability in people's lives, homes and communities. Data from the Study is used by university researchers from many different disciplines, as well as by government departments, think tanks, charities and businesses. Understanding Society has been used in thousands of research articles and reports. The Study helps researchers, charities and policymakers to take the lives of real people into account when making decisions.

== See also ==
Understanding Society is part of a world-wide collection of household panel surveys, including:

- Panel Study of Income Dynamics (PSID), based at the University of Michigan
- German Socio-Economic Panel (SOEP), based at the German Institute for Economic Research Berlin
- Household, Income and Labour Dynamics in Australia Survey (HILDA)
