= Panel Study of Income Dynamics =

Longitudinal panel survey

- Logo of the University of Michigan, which administers the study

Agency overview
- Formed: 1968
- Jurisdiction: United States
- Headquarters: Institute for Social Research, University of Michigan, Ann Arbor, MI
- Employees: ≈ 18,000 individuals in 5,000+ families (as of 2020)
- Parent agency: University of Michigan; Funded by National Science Foundation and National Institutes of Health
- Website: psidonline.isr.umich.edu

The Panel Study of Income Dynamics (PSID) is a longitudinal panel survey of American families, conducted by the Survey Research Center at the University of Michigan.

The PSID measures economic, social, and health factors over the life course of families over multiple generations. Data have been collected from the same families and their descendants since 1968. It has been claimed that it is the world’s longest running household panel survey, and more than 7,600 peer-reviewed publications have been based on PSID data.

As of 2025, Thomas Crossley of the University of Michigan's Institute for Social Research is the director of PSID.

== Background ==
The PSID gathers data about the circumstances of the family as a whole and about each individual in the family. The greatest level of detail is gathered for the primary adult(s) heading the family. The PSID has achieved high and consistent response rates, and because of low attrition and the success in following young adults as they form their own families, the sample size has grown from 4,800 families in 1968, to 7,000 families in 2001, to 7,400 by 2005, and to more than 9,000 as of 2013. By 2003, the PSID had collected information on more than 65,000 individuals. As of 2013, the PSID had information on over 75,000 individuals, spanning as many as four decades of their lives.

== Framework ==
The structure of the PSID started with two distinct samples. A nationally representative sample designed by the Survey Research Center became known as the SRC sample. A second sample of individuals was drawn from lower income levels, and this became known as the Survey of Economic Opportunity (SEO) sample. This second sample, though not nationally representative, allowed for more studies to investigate poverty in the United States. After this initial 1968 interview, families were interviewed each year until 1997. After 1997, the survey has been biennial, with data being collected every two years. Over time, as individuals leave their household, they are followed as they form their new residence. As time passed, the representativeness of the original sample became more and more out of line with the overall US demographic. To ameliorate the potential bias, two additional samples were added to the PSID. A third sample consisting of Latinos was added. In 1997, a new fourth Immigrant sample was added, and the other three reorganized. All three continued to be collected, but with a reduced number of households. The two "core" samples (SRC and SEO) were reduced to include 6,168 families, and the Latino sample was reduced to 2000 families. To these, a new set of 441 families from the Immigrant sample created a study group capable of tracking the current demographics in the US.

Until 1972, interviews were done in person using paper. Since 1973 interviews are by phone. Starting in 1993, interviews were conducted using Computer Assisted Telephone (CAT) technology.

=== Child Development Supplement ===
The Child Development Supplement (CDS) is a research component of the PSID. The CDS provides researchers with extensive data on children and their extended families with which to study the dynamic process of early human and social capital formation. The first CDS study included up to two children per household who were 0 to 12 years old in 1997, and followed those children over three waves, ending in 2007-08. The CDS 2014 includes all eligible children in PSID households born since 1997.

=== Transition into Adulthood Supplement ===
When children in the CDS cohort reach 18 years of age, information is obtained about their circumstances through a telephone interview completed shortly after the Main Interview. This study, called Transition into Adulthood Supplement, has been implemented in 2005, and biennially thereafter. Information includes measures of time use, psychological functioning, marriage, family, responsibilities, employment and income, education and career goals, health, social environment, religiosity, and outlook on life.

=== File structure of the PSID ===
The PSID's information is held in many files. The main head and wife responses are held in a series of "Family Files" that are uniquely identified by a Family ID number. A smaller subset of information pertaining to individuals (whether they are a head, wife, or other family unit members) is contained in the cross-year individual file, and each record is uniquely identified by a 1968 Family ID and Person Number pair. Many additional supplemental files are available with supplemental information that may have been collected for only one or a few years.

=== Topical information ===
The PSID collects data on a wide array of social, demographic, health, economic, geospatial and psychological data. As of 2009, the 75 minute interview collected data on:

- employment
- earnings
- income from all sources
- expenditures covering 100% of total household spending
- transfers
- housing
- education
- geospatial data
- health status
- health behaviors
- health insurance
- early childhood and adult health conditions and their timing
- emotional well-being
- life satisfaction
- mortality and cause of death
- marriage and fertility
- participation in government programs
- financial distress including problems paying debt such as mortgages and foreclosure
- vehicle ownership
- wealth
- pensions
- philanthropy

Many of these areas have been included in the instrument since 1968. Hundreds of additional variables that fall into other domains have been collected in various waves throughout the history of the PSID. No identifying information is distributed to data users and the identity of all respondents is held in confidence.

Approximately 7,600 peer-reviewed publications are based on PSID data published in the fields of economics, sociology, demography, psychology, child development, public health, medicine, education, communications, and others. The PSID was named one of the National Science Foundation's "Sensational Sixty" NSF-funded inventions, innovations and discoveries that have become commonplace in American lives.

== Researchers and funding ==
The main source of support for the study comes from the National Science Foundation, the National Institute on Aging and the National Institute of Child Health and Human Development. There are other important sponsors of the study as well including the Office of the Assistant Secretary for Planning and Evaluation of the United States Department of Health and Human Services, the Economic Research Service of the United States Department of Agriculture, the United States Department of Housing and Urban Development and the Center on Philanthropy at Indiana University.

== See also ==
- List of household surveys in the United States

The PSID has sister surveys conducted in other countries, including:

- German Socio-Economic Panel (SOEP), housed at the German Institute for Economic Research (DIW) Berlin
- British Household Panel Survey (BHPS) conducted by investigators at the University of Essex and now merging with the UK households: a longitudinal study
- Household, Income and Labour Dynamics in Australia Survey (HILDA)
- Italian Survey on Household Income and Wealth (SHIW)
