= Administrative divisions of Virginia =

The administrative divisions of Virginia are the areas into which the Commonwealth of Virginia, a U.S. state, is divided for political and administrative purposes. Some are local governments; others are not. However, all local governments (counties, independent cities, and incorporated towns) are political subdivisions of the state.

According to the 2022 Census of Governments, Virginia ranked 44th among the 50 states with the lowest number of local governments, with 522 total combined local government entities.

== Counties ==
Virginia has 95 counties, covering all of the territory not within the independent cities. Under Virginia law, counties may be chartered, although most are not. Their populations vary widely; in 2022 estimated populations ranged from 2,301 for Highland County to 1,138,331 for Fairfax County.

Since Virginia has no civil townships, and since incorporated towns cover such a small area of the state, the county is the de facto local government for much of the state, from rural areas to densely populated unincorporated communities such as Tysons Corner. In fact, Arlington County, while geographically small and entirely urbanized, is completely unincorporated, making the county board the sole governing body in the entire county.

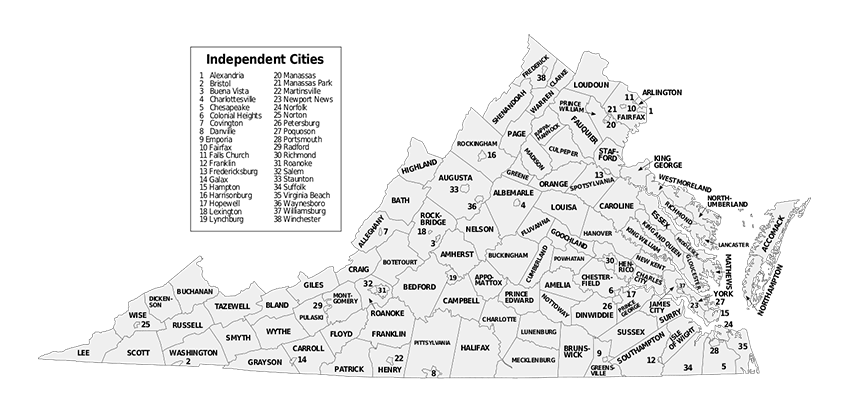
Virginia counties and independent cities

== Cities and towns ==
=== Independent cities ===
Since 1871, all incorporated cities in Virginia have classified as independent cities. This is the most noteworthy aspect of Virginia local government relative to the other 49 states. Of the 41 independent cities in the United States, 38 are in Virginia. The three that are not in Virginia are Baltimore, Maryland; St. Louis, Missouri; and Carson City, Nevada. Some other states have consolidated city-counties, which differ from independent cities in that in a consolidated city-county, the county still exists at least in name, whereas in an independent city, it does not. Cities in Virginia are thus similar to unitary authorities in some countries. The United States Census Bureau treats all cities in Virginia as county-equivalents.

Other municipalities, even though they may be more populous than some existing independent cities, are incorporated as "towns", and as such form part of a county. Eight independent cities had 2010 populations of less than 10,000 with the smallest, Norton, having a population of only 3958. On the other hand, six towns had populations of over 10,000.

An independent city in Virginia may serve as the county seat of an adjacent county, even though the city by definition is not part of that county. An example is Fairfax, which is an independent city as well as the seat of Fairfax County.

A city can be formed from any area with a defined boundary having a population of 5,000 or more. Cities have been formed in the following ways:

- An area within a county, which may or may not have been a town previously, incorporates as a city and thus becomes independent. Examples are Falls Church, which separated from Fairfax County, and Virginia Beach, which separated from (and later merged with) Princess Anne County.
- A county is converted into a city. An example was the former city of Nansemond, which later merged with Suffolk.
- Various local governments consolidate to form a city. An example is Chesapeake, formed from the merger of the independent city of South Norfolk and Norfolk County.

Where the residents of an area of sufficient size wish to incorporate as a city, they must petition the Virginia state legislature to grant them a municipal charter.

==== Second class cities ====
Virginia's independent cities were classified by the Virginia General Assembly in 1871 as cities of the first class and cities of the second class. The Virginia Constitution of 1902 defined first-class cities as those having a population of 10,000 or more based upon the last census enumeration, while second-class cities were those that had a population of fewer than 10,000. Cities which previously had been granted a city charter, but did not have the requisite population, had their status grandfathered in. Second-class cities did not have a court of record and were required to share the cost of that court with their adjacent county and also shared the cost for three constitutional officers of that court — generally, the clerk, commonwealth's attorney and sheriff — and those shared officers stood for election in both the city and the county. At least two constitutional officers — treasurer and commissioner of the revenue — were required to be elected solely by the residents of the city. The distinction between first- and second-class cities was ended with the Virginia Constitution of 1971. But cities that were classified as second-class cities at the time of the adoption of the 1971 Virginia Constitution were authorized to continue sharing their court system and three constitutional officers with the adjacent county. Fourteen of Virginia's independent cities retained these features.

=== Towns ===
Unlike Virginia's cities, and like municipalities in most other states, incorporated towns are municipalities that are within counties. Local government is thus divided between the town and the county. A town can be formed from any area with a defined boundary having a population of 1,000 or more. The method for forming towns is the same as for cities, petitioning the state legislature to grant a charter. As of 2014, there are 191 incorporated towns in Virginia.

Virginia also has unincorporated communities which are also called towns colloquially.

=== Powers of municipalities ===
Local government in Virginia is subject to Dillon's Rule, which holds that cities and towns only have those powers expressly granted to them by Virginia or federal law, any power implied by those express powers, and those powers essential to the municipality's existence.

Under Virginia law, a municipality, whether a city or a town, must have a municipal charter; that is, there are no general-law municipalities. The charter is a form of contract, and the municipality has no power to act outside of its charter. With few exceptions, a municipality's powers are narrowly construed.

Typically, the powers extended to Virginia municipalities usually include the following:

- Exercising the general police power to enact and enforce rules and regulations to promote the health, safety, morals, or welfare of its citizens, provided that such rules may not be arbitrary, discriminatory, or unreasonable.
- Imposing taxes on its residents, usually in the form of a local property tax or sales tax.
- Borrowing money and issuing tax-exempt bonds, with the caveat that bonds generally may not be issued unless they have been authorized by either a ballot vote or a special hearing, and only for the purpose of making capital expenditures.
- Acquiring, possessing, and expending the revenue acquired through the above means.
- Hiring and firing personnel.
- Entering into contracts for the fulfillment of other functions within its powers. However, a contract between a municipality and another party to do something outside of its charter is ultra vires, and therefore unenforceable as a nullity.
- Acquiring, possessing, and disposing of real property, including through the exercise of the power of eminent domain.
- Acquiring, possessing, and disposing of personal property.
- Initiating lawsuits.

State law prohibits municipalities from having an amount of outstanding debt greater than 10% of the value of the taxable real estate within that municipality, with a few exceptions made for certain kinds of bonds, particularly those used to fund projects expected to make enough money to repay the bonds within a set time frame. Municipalities are also prohibited from enacting income taxes, but they may impose licensing fees on specific occupations, and the Virginia Supreme Court has held that such licensing fees can be adjusted upwards or downwards to reflect the level of income of a particular business.

Both cities and towns in Virginia have certain functions that are considered "public" functions - such as having police apprehend criminals, or educating children - and others that are considered "private" functions - such as holding a town fair or landscaping around sidewalks on private land. The legal significance of this distinction lies in the liability of the municipality to be sued by someone injured by its employees.

==== Ordinances ====
One of the powers granted by the state to political subdivisions is the power to enact local regulations regarding matters covered by the local charter, called ordinances. In order to pass an ordinance, a locality must provide published notice of the proposed ordinance prior to its enactment, including the text of the ordinance or a reasonable summary thereof, and particularly directed to the attention of residents likely to be affected by it and advising such residents of their ability to object to the proposal. The ordinance must be debated in a public meeting and passed by a majority vote of the governing body of that subdivision.

Some limitations exist on the power to enact ordinances. The Supreme Court of the United States has held that the United States Constitution requires that laws, including municipal ordinances, may not be arbitrary or discriminatory, and may not be unreasonably vague, so that a resident may be reasonably certain that their conduct conforms to the law. Furthermore, local governments cannot delegate the power to enact ordinances to other bodies. However, they may establish fixed and certain standards for carrying out certain activities (such as home building or operating restaurants), and then delegate to subordinate bodies the power to make rules governing how residents can demonstrate compliance with these standards.

A resident who wishes to challenge the validity of an ordinance need not wait until it has been enforced against them (although it may be challenged at that time). Instead, a resident may bring an action for a declaratory judgment alleging that the ordinance is void because it was not properly noticed, goes beyond the county charter, is arbitrary, discriminatory, or unreasonably vague, or that it is preempted by state or federal law. An ordinance will be deemed preempted if it addresses an activity for which the state has prohibited local regulation altogether, or where it is inconsistent with state law. An ordinance may not permit an activity that is expressly prohibited by state law or prohibits an activity that is expressly permitted by state law. However, if some state regulation exists as to an activity, political subdivisions may impose further regulations on that activity so long as it is possible for a resident to comply with both sets of regulations.

==== Zoning ====
Every municipality is required to maintain a publicly accessible zoning map indicating what parcels of property within the municipality may be used for what purpose. This map must be updated at least every five years. Every municipality is required by state law to have a zoning administrator who oversees the local government's regulatory scheme and is generally the party responsible for bringing legal actions against zoning violators. Each municipality is also required to have a board of zoning appeals empowered to grant variances and settle boundary disputes. The standard for granting of variances is that the party requesting the variance faces an unnecessary hardship unique to that party, but that adjacent property will not suffer a substantial detriment, and the character of the district will not be changed. The board may also grant special use permits allowing a property owner to use a property for a purpose that is neither specifically permitted nor specifically prohibited within a particular zoning area, and such permits may be conditioned on the property owner making concessions such as improving roads leading into the property, providing street lighting in the area, or setting aside a certain amount of land for public use. The board of zoning appeals may be appealed to the local Circuit Court if such an appeal is filed within 30 days of the zoning board decision, and from there decisions may be appealed directly to the Virginia Supreme Court.

==== Eminent domain and inverse condemnation ====
A political subdivision may exercise eminent domain against property in its jurisdiction, provided that it comports with the requirements set forth by Virginia law. All localities are empowered by their charters to acquire property through condemnation. In order to effect such a seizure of property, the local government must demonstrate that a public need for the property exists, which must be declared in a resolution or ordinance passed through the usual process for passing ordinances. The locality must make a good-faith offer to purchase the land at a value appraised by the city.

Following the United States Supreme Court decision in Kelo v. City of New London, the Virginia legislature enacted limitations on the purposes for which property could be taken, specifying that public uses include government offices, utilities, and prevention of urban blight, and excluding the condemnation of property for the purpose of giving it to private parties.

The government, in asserting eminent domain, must pay the owner the fair market value of that land. If the government takes only part of the property, it must pay both the value of the land that was taken, plus any decrease in the market value of the remaining portion (called the "residue"). A person who contests the value assessed for such a taking is entitled to empanel a committee of jurors to determine the fair value. A resident can also seek compensation for damage to the value of real property arising out of government activity through an action for inverse condemnation. The immunity to suit generally enjoyed by local governments does not apply to such actions, pursuant to the Fifth Amendment to the United States Constitution as incorporated by the Supreme Court.

== School divisions ==
A school division is the area under a jurisdiction of a school board. Unlike school districts in most other states, Virginia's school divisions are not completely separate units of local government. This is because no school division has taxing authority. Instead, they are dependent upon their associated city, town, or county governments for at least a portion of their funding. Additional funds may come directly to a school division, typically from state and federal sources.

== Special districts, agencies ==
While special districts exist in Virginia, they are generally less important than in other states. As of June 2012, Virginia had 193 special-district governments, as well as numerous special agencies, areas, and districts that were subordinate to the state or to a county, city, or town government.

Several examples of the many special districts and agencies created as political subdivisions for specific purposes are:

- Richmond-Petersburg Turnpike Authority, formed in 1955, which sold toll revenue bonds, built and operated the Richmond-Petersburg Turnpike, and collected tolls until 1973, when its duties were assumed by another state agency by an Act of the General Assembly.
- Chesapeake Bay Bridge and Tunnel District which built and operates the Chesapeake Bay Bridge-Tunnel, a 23-mile-long (37 km) bridge-tunnel facility which crosses the mouth of the Chesapeake Bay, entirely located within Virginia.
- Central Virginia Waste Management Authority (CVWMA), formed in 1990 to coordinate recycling and waste management programs for thirteen localities in central Virginia.
- Airport authorities, such as the Peninsula Airport Commission, which owns and operates the Newport News/Williamsburg International Airport in Newport News.
- Virginia Housing Development Authority (VHDA), a self-supporting, not-for-profit organization created by the Commonwealth of Virginia in 1972, to help Virginians attain quality, affordable housing.

Although the Washington Metropolitan Area Transit Authority serves suburbs in Virginia (and Maryland), the Census Bureau counts it as a District of Columbia special district for statistical purposes.

== Other political subdivisions ==
=== Magisterial districts, election districts, and wards ===
Magisterial districts, election districts, and wards are minor civil divisions established for elections, administrative functions, or both. They are not separate units of local government.

=== Boroughs ===
Under Code of Virginia § 15.2-3534, when multiple local governments consolidate to form a consolidated city, the consolidated city may be divided into geographical subdivisions called "boroughs", which may be the same as the existing (i) cities, (ii) counties, or (iii) portions of such counties. Those boroughs are not separate local governments.

For example, Chesapeake is divided into six boroughs, one corresponding to the former city of South Norfolk and one corresponding to each of the five magisterial districts of the former Norfolk County. Suffolk is divided into seven boroughs, one corresponding to the former city of Suffolk and one corresponding to each of the six magisterial districts of the former Nansemond County. In Virginia Beach, the seven boroughs were abolished effective July 1, 1998.

=== Villages ===
In Virginia, villages are defined as tracts of land with fixed boundaries for the purpose of preventing the free roaming of animals. Villages are defined as having at least 300 residents and are established by petition to the circuit court of the county in which they are located.

=== Potential political subdivisions ===
State statute provides that when multiple local governments consolidate, existing political subdivisions may continue in existence as townships (not to be confused with civil townships in some states), tier-cities, or shires. However, none have yet been created.

=== Abolished political subdivisions ===
The 1870 Constitution of Virginia required the division of counties into townships, but an amendment in 1874 converted those townships into magisterial districts.

== Relationships, regional cooperation ==
Various political subdivisions may do business with each other and the state and federal government in a manner similar to private individuals, limited partnerships, and corporations, with the notable exception that some restrictions may apply with regards to public information, competitive bidding, personal use of government-owned property, vehicles, resources, etc.

In recent years, Virginia has tried to encourage regional cooperation among localities. Special favorable funding for regional jails has been one area were incentives have encouraged such efforts. However, Virginia's annexation laws and past experiences have long been felt by many leaders to be a barrier to regional cooperation among localities.

== Annexations, alternatives ==
Expansion of borders through annexation suits against neighboring counties and incorporated towns has long been a method available to the independent cities to grow, with incorporated towns also able to take such actions against counties. Since the years of the Byrd Organization, state funding formulas have tended to favor rural areas, and growth through annexation was seen as a countermeasure financially by many cities and towns. However, such actions are often controversial and in some cases, have resulted in protracted and costly legal proceedings. They also often leave residents of an annexed area feeling that they had no say in the process.

=== Wave of consolidations, town-to-city conversions ===
Partially because independent cities are immune from annexation by adjacent localities, an action much-feared by those in many communities, in the mid 20th century, a wave of consolidations of local governments led to almost the entire southeastern portion of Virginia progressively becoming a web of adjoining independent cities. Many incorporated (formally constituted) localities, including counties, cities, and towns, some over 250 years old, became legally extinct between 1952 and 1975. A law passed by the General Assembly in 1960 allowed any city and adjacent county to consolidate by mutual agreement. Of the 10 current independent cities of the Hampton Roads region, fully 8 of them adjoin others. In the region, only the cities of Franklin and Williamsburg are surrounded by traditional counties.

This transition left the region with some oddities, such as the entire Virginia portion of the Great Dismal Swamp being located entirely within cities (Chesapeake and Suffolk) and the rise of Virginia Beach to the most populous city in the state (usurping Norfolk), even though it lacks the urban characteristics typically associated with large cities.

=== Generating animosity between neighboring localities ===
While the mass conversion to independent cities such as occurred in the Hampton Roads region did not repeat elsewhere in the state, city-county annexations have generally created more conflicts and been a barrier to future regional cooperation than those of towns and counties. This may be because the individuals of the latter groups realize from the outset that they will be required to continue to work together afterward (since all towns are within counties).

=== Richmond: a center of annexation efforts and conflicts ===
The City of Richmond grew by annexations, contested and not, of portions of both Henrico and Chesterfield counties throughout its history.

In 1940, the City of Richmond annexed 10 square miles (26 km^{2}) of Henrico County. In the two decades that followed, the little bedroom community known as Henrico County began to shape its own identity. When the City of Richmond decided once again that they needed to expand, things had changed.

In 1959, there were just over 107,000 residents in Henrico County. By 1965 that number had increased by nearly 40,000. Nationwide, urban flight was on the rise as people flocked to neighboring counties. As a result, Virginia's cities began to look across their borders for much needed tax relief.

In the late 1950s and early 60s, annexing just a small portion of a neighboring county became largely a thing of the past. In order to meet the needs of their growing populations, some cities and counties throughout Virginia began to merge entirely (through the consolidation process enabled by the 1960 Virginia General Assembly).

In 1959, local business owners in the City of Richmond reacted to the statewide trend and jump-started the process toward a consolidation agreement with Henrico County. In attempt to reach a mutual agreement, each locality appointed three negotiators to represent its interests. Once a plan was agreed upon, the citizens of both Richmond and Henrico were asked to approve the merger in a vote, held on December 12, 1961. The merger failed at the polls, and just two weeks later, on December 27, 1961, Richmond City Council filed suit to annex 142 square miles (370 km^{2}) of Henrico County.

It would take more than three years for the special annexation court to announce its decision. Finally, on April 27, 1964, the court ruled in favor of the City of Richmond, but it only awarded the city 17 square miles (44 km^{2}) of the 142 square miles (370 km^{2}) that it had requested. The City of Richmond then declined to accept and pay for the land that was awarded in the annexation.

During the years that followed, Henrico County was granted immunity from the threat of annexation and consolidation, a State law that is still in force today.

More problems and hard feelings arose from a Richmond-Chesterfield case which began in 1965; they were later used as prime examples of obstacles to regional cooperation as the state legislators have considered changes. The resulting 1970 annexation was exceptionally controversial and took more than seven years to be resolved in court.

In that case, while the annexation lawsuit filed by Richmond in 1965 was being heard, with the city seeking 51 square miles (132 km^{2}) of the county, the leaders of the two jurisdictions, Irvin G. Horner, the chairman of the Chesterfield County Board of Supervisors, and Phil J. Bagley Jr., the mayor of the City of Richmond, met privately and agreed to this compromise.

In May 1969, the Horner-Bagley Compromise, as it came to be called, was approved by the county and city and incorporated in a court decree of July 12, 1969. This effectively shut out a number of third parties attempting to block the annexation, who felt they had been excluded from the process. An example among these was a small commuter bus company holding an operating rights in the county, whereas the city granted its bus franchise to a competitor. Taxicab operators were similarly impacted. More significantly, 47,000 people found themselves living in a different jurisdiction without a public referendum.

The Chesterfield-Richmond annexation agreement resulted in Richmond receiving 23 square miles (60 km^{2}) of the county, as well as fire stations, parks, and other infrastructure such as water and sewer lines. Under the agreement, approximately a dozen public schools, support buildings, and future school sites were conveyed to the City of Richmond to be operated by Richmond Public Schools. Compounding the unhappiness of many of the residents of the annexed area was that Richmond Public Schools was already involved in a desegregation lawsuit in the U.S. Federal Courts. The schools involved in the annexed area included the Huguenot High School, the Fred D. Thompson Middle School, the Elkhardt Middle School, and eight elementary schools. In 1971, these schools were included in a court-ordered desegregation busing program, which was finally ceased sometime during the 1990s.

Many of the 47,000 residents who lived in the annexed area of the compromise of 1970 had been opposed to the annexation. They fought unsuccessfully for over seven years in the courts to have the annexation reversed, and ruefully called it the 23 square miles (60 km^{2}) zone "Occupied Chesterfield."

At the same time, black plaintiffs who had lived in the city prior to the annexation claimed a violation of the National Voting Rights Act of 1965. The claim was that their voting power had been deliberately diminished by the attempts of city leaders to add white voters and dilute to black vote. The pre-annexation population of the city as of 1970 was 202,359, of which 104,207 or 52% were black citizens. The annexation added to the city 47,262 people, of whom 1,557 were black and 45,705 were non-black. The post-annexation population of the city was therefore 249,621, of which 105,764 or 42% were black. The plaintiffs prevailed in court by creation of a ward system which guaranteed black voters would be represented fairly in city government.

=== Methods to avoid annexation fears and conflicts ===
Since then, the State has taken several actions to avoid such conflicts. An agency of the Virginia Department of Housing and Community Development, the Commission on Local Government promotes and preserves the viability of Virginia's local governments by fostering positive intergovernmental relations.

In some instances, neighboring localities have entered into agreements, such as a revenue sharing agreement between the independent city of Charlottesville and surrounding Albemarle County. Beginning in 1982, in return for receiving a portion of annual county tax revenues, the city agreed to not attempt to annex portions of the county. The agency's website lists many such deals between municipal neighbors.

Additionally, in 1979, the Virginia General Assembly adopted legislation that allowed any county meeting certain population and density standards to petition the local circuit court to declare the county permanently immune from annexation by any city with over 100,000 in population. In 1981, Chesterfield County and several other counties in the state subsequently sought and received such immunity from further annexation by Richmond.

In 1987, the General Assembly, recognizing the controversy surrounding annexations in Virginia, placed a moratorium on future annexations of any county by any city. Should this moratorium expire, Chesterfield County would remain immune from annexation by Richmond because of the 1981 grant of immunity, but not from annexation by its other adjoining cities.

== Legal liability of subdivisions and their employees ==
=== Contract liability ===
As noted above, a local government may only enter into a contract that is within the scope of its charter. A contract to do something beyond its power is void and unenforceable, and in fact the local government will be prohibited from performing its obligations under such a contract. The private party who performs under such a contract will have no means of recovery, even under equitable theories such as equitable estoppel, implied contract, quantum meruit, and unjust enrichment. This limitation also applies where the subject of the contract is permissible under the charter, but the manner in which the contract is made or awarded violates proscriptions set forth in the charter. For example, if the charter requires that contracts for provision of a public service be awarded to the lowest bidder in an open bidding process, and such a process is not used to award the contract, then the contract itself is void and the private party to the contract will have no recourse to enforce the local government's obligations thereunder.

Individual employees of a local government, including the highest-level executives of that body, have no power to bind the local government to a contract that is void due to one of the above scenarios. This is because the limitations on the power of the local government to contract are a matter of public record. As a general rule, the individual employee is immune from being sued for inadvertently entering into a void contract with a private party. However, this immunity does not extend to the intentional tort of fraud. If a local government employee knowingly and intentionally made a false representation to a third party that the local government would be bound to a particular contract, that employee could be sued for damages suffered by the third party's reliance on that false promise.

Where a local government makes a contract that is within its power, and then fails to perform its obligations under the contract, it may be sued in the same manner as any other entity and may raise all defenses typically available in a contract action. However, if it is a county government that is alleged to be in breach, Virginia law imposes several additional steps before a lawsuit may be brought. Specifically, the claim must be formally presented to the county's governing body for an allowance, and it is only after that governing body has disallowed the claim that its decision may be appealed to the Virginia Circuit Court. The claim must be brought within thirty days of the disallowance if the claimant is present when the governing body so decides; if the claimant is not present, the claim must be brought within thirty days of the claimant receiving notice of the disallowance. In either case, the appeal must specify that the required presentment was made. This rule also applies to equitable claims for monetary relief.

=== Tort liability ===
==== Liability of subdivisions ====
The state of Virginia has enacted the Virginia Tort Claims Act, which waives the sovereign immunity of the state with respect to actions brought under certain limitations. However, by the terms of the statute itself, this waiver does not extend to political subdivisions. Thus, counties, which are considered to be arms of the state, still carry the state's traditional complete immunity from tort lawsuits. Cities and towns are not considered arms of the state and are only held to be immune from such lawsuits if the city or town was exercising a public or "governmental" function. Such functions have been held to include police and firefighting activities, and education. However, a city or town may be sued when carrying out a "proprietary" function, such as providing gas, electricity, water, sewage collection and disposal, or storm drainage. With regards to building and maintaining of roads and laying out roads is considered to be a governmental function, but cleaning and maintaining roads and public ways that have already been laid out is deemed to be proprietary. An activity that combines governmental and proprietary functions is clothed in the protection of governmental functions. A suit cannot be brought based on an unsafe condition of the street unless the municipality is first given reasonable notice and allowed a reasonable amount of time to remedy it. The operation of public recreational facilities is stated by the state statute to fall within the immunity of governmental function.

Virginia does not recognize the doctrine of res ipsa loquitur when applied against local governments providing such services, so the civil plaintiff is required to prove that the local government is responsible for the condition that led to damage or injury. Political subdivisions may waive their sovereign immunity, and wherever and whenever a local government purchases insurance for its vehicles, such as cars, trucks, and buses, that local government will be ruled to have waived its sovereign immunity up to the amount of the policy. A municipality can be sued for nuisances - the negligent creation of a hazardous situation - even if the nuisance was created in the course of carrying out a governmental function.

In addition to the aforementioned limitations, a plaintiff seeking to sue a city or county in tort must provide the subdivision with notice, said notice including the nature of the claim, and the date and location of the injury, within six months after the claim arises. This notice must be provided to one of a set list of people set forth in state statute, these being the subdivision's attorney, mayor, or chief executive.

==== Liability of employees ====
Employees of a municipality who are performing governmental functions generally share in the immunity of the municipality itself, although this does not protect them from being sued for gross negligence (as opposed to "ordinary" negligence) or for intentional torts. High-level employees, such as mayors, city managers, and judges, are immune for decisions made within the scope of their employment. The immunity of lower level employees is determined by examining four factors set forth by the Virginia Supreme Court in James v. Jane:

1. The nature of the function performed by the employee
2. The extent of the state's interest and involvement in the function
3. The degree of control and direction exercised by the state over the employee
4. Whether the act complained of involved the use of judgment and discretion.

Where an employee is grossly negligent, or engages in intentional torts, the employee may be held liable, but the locality remains immune so long as the employee was providing a governmental function.

Independent contractors are not considered employees and are therefore not subject to any kind of immunity.
