= United States Economic Census =

- Genre: Census
- Frequency: Quinquenial
- Country: United States
- Inaugurated: 1810 as part of the 1810 United States census and 1905 as part of the first separate manufacturing census
- Most recent: 2022
- Next event: 2027
- Organiser: United States Census Bureau
- Website: www.census.gov/programs-surveys/economic-census.html

The United States Economic Census is the U.S. federal government's official five-year measure of American business and the economy. It is conducted by the U.S. Census Bureau, and response is required by law. Forms go out to nearly 4 million businesses, including large, medium and small companies representing all U.S. locations and industries. Respondents are asked to provide a range of operational and performance data for their companies. Trade associations, chambers of commerce, and businesses use information from the economic census for economic development, business decisions, and strategic planning purposes. The last Economic Census was conducted for the year 2022.

The Economic Census, together with the separately conducted censuses of agriculture and governments, covers virtually the entire economy, except for forestry, agricultural support, rail transportation, and employment by private households.

== History ==
Censuses have measured American economic activities since the first census of manufactures was taken in 1810. As the nation's economy has grown, the scope of what is now called the Economic Census expanded to include retail and wholesale trade, construction industries, mining, and a broad array of services.

Early in the 19th century, Congress responded to an increase in industrial activity and ordered census takers—at that time, federal marshals—to "take an account of the several manufactures within their several districts, territories and divisions" as part of the 1810 United States census. As the marshals traveled from house to house counting the population, they asked questions on 25 broad categories of manufactured products and more than 200 kinds of goods.

In successive decades the census came to include certain non-manufacturing businesses as well, such as retail stores, lumber yards and butcher shops. Then in 1902, Congress authorized the establishment of a permanent Census Bureau, and at the same time directed that a census of manufactures be taken every five years. The 1905 manufacturing census marked the first time a census of any kind was taken separately from the regular every 10 years population census.

The first census of business, covering retail and wholesale trade, was conducted in 1930, and shortly thereafter was broadened to include some service trades. The periodic economic censuses were suspended during World War II in favor of war-oriented surveys. They resumed with the 1947 Census of Manufactures and the 1948 Census of Business.

The Economic Census almost took another hiatus when the administration of President Dwight Eisenhower failed to provide funding for the 1953 Economic Census. Then, in October 1953, the United States secretary of commerce appointed Dr. Ralph J. Watkins, then Director of Research for Dun and Bradstreet, to form an Intensive Review Committee to study the issue. The committee made its report, "Appraisal of Census Programs," in February 1954. Its series of testimonials from the business, financial, professional, and governmental groups represented on the Committee led to the reinstatement of the Economic Census for 1954.

The 1954 Economic Census was the first to fully integrate census taking for the various kinds of business. The census provided comparable statistics across economic sectors, using consistent time periods, concepts, definitions, classification and reporting units. For the first time, an electronic computer (UNIVAC 1) was used to process Economic Census data.

The 1954 Economic Census also was the first to be taken by mail, using lists of firms provided from the administrative records of other federal agencies. Since 1963, administrative records have been used to provide basic statistics for very small firms, reducing or eliminating the need to send them census questionnaires.

The range of industries covered in the economic census has continued to expand. The census of construction industries began on a regular basis in 1967. The scope of service industries coverage was broadened at various points over the following 25 years.

The census of transportation began in 1963 as a set of surveys covering travel, transportation of commodities, and trucks. Starting in 1987, census publications also reported on business establishments engaged in several transportation industries, paralleling the data on establishments in other sectors.

The final major expansion of the Economic Census took place in 1992, adding more transportation industries, plus finance, insurance, real estate, communications, and utilities, a group accounting for more than 20 percent of U.S. gross domestic product.

The 1997 Economic Census was the first major statistical report based on the North American Industry Classification System (NAICS). Developed cooperatively by the U.S., Canada, and Mexico, NAICS replaced the Standard Industrial Classification (SIC) system to provide greater comparability with international statistics.

The first survey of minority-owned businesses covered 1969, and a parallel program began for women-owned businesses for 1977. Now titled the Survey of Business Owners, this program presents statistics according to the federal standard that allows respondents to report more than one race. The survey also gathers expanded characteristics of businesses and their owners, including age and veteran status of the owners and the identification of home-based business and participation in franchising.

== Purposes and uses ==
- The economic census is the major source of facts about the structure and functioning of Nation's economy and provides vital information for government, business, industry and for general public.
- The economic census provide a vital part of the framework for such composite measures as the GDP, input and output measures, production and price indices, and other statistical series that measure the short term changes in economic conditions.
- Policy making agencies of the Federal Government use data, especially in monitoring economic activity and providing assistance to business.
- State and local governments use the data to access business activities and tax bases within their authorities and to develop programs to attract tourists.
- Trade associations study trends in their own and competing industries and keep their members informed of market changes.
- Individual businesses use data to locate potential markets and to study their own production and sales performance related to industry or area.

== Types of economic census ==
Title 13 of the US Code (sections 131, 191, 224) manages the Census Bureau to take economic census every five years. The 1992 Economic Census consists of the following censuses:

- Census of Retail Trade
- Census of Wholesale Trade
- Census of Service Industries
- Census of Financial, Insurance and Real Estate Industries
- Census of Transportation, Communication and Utilities
- Census of Manufactures
- Census of Mineral Industries
- Census of Construction Industries

== Data processing and confidentiality ==
Responses to the Economic Census have been treated as confidential since the 19th century. Legislation authorizing the 1910 decennial census went even further and required that statistics be published so that no particular establishment or its operations could be identified.

In 1954, the confidentiality provisions were incorporated into the law (Title 13 of the United States Code) that specifies the frequency and scope of the Economic Census. The law also prescribes penalties for any disclosure by the Census Bureau, or for a respondent's false reporting or willful refusal where response is mandatory. In 1962, the confidentiality rule for census questionnaires was extended by law to also make copies retained in respondents' files immune from legal process (13 U.S.C. § 9a).

The automation of the Economic Census dates back to the use of tabulating typewriters in 1900, punch card tabulating equipment in 1920, and electronic computers in 1954. Starting in 1967, selected large firms were allowed to file their reports on computer tape. The 2002 Economic Census was the first to allow every firm to file electronically.

== Data dissemination ==
Since 1972, most of the same statistics found in printed reports have also been available to data users in electronic media, initially on computer tape. The 1987 Economic Census was the first to be published on CD-ROM, a practice continued until 2002, when the medium changed to DVD. Key 1987 statistics were also published online via CENDATA. Only a few reports were published in print for 1997, and none were printed in 2002. Portable document format (pdf) technology allowed anyone to print out 1992, 1997, and 2002 reports from their computers on demand. Since 1997, the primary means for data users to access Economic Census statistics is through American FactFinder.
