= University of Virginia Demographics and Workforce Group =

Demographics & Workforce Group
- Abbreviation: Demographics & Workforce
- Formation: 1944; 81 years ago
- Type: Non-profit
- Headquarters: 2400 Old Ivy Road, Charlottesville, Virginia 22903
- Location: University of Virginia
- Director: Qian Cai
- Website: Demographics & Workforce

The Demographics and Workforce Group at the University of Virginia is a research and training organization responsible for producing annual population estimates for the Commonwealth of Virginia.

== History ==
The Demographics and Workforce Group was first formed on June 1, 1940, when the Virginia State Planning Board appointed Lorin Thompson as the director. The Demographics and Workforce Group began producing Virginia county and city population estimates in the late 1950s. In 1967, when the United States Census Bureau undertook its federal-state cooperative program to improve population estimates, Governor Mills Godwin designated the Demographics and Workforce Group Virginia's "official source of statistics on population."

== Legal mandate ==
The Code of Virginia stipulates that the Weldon Cooper Center Demographics and Workforce Group's annual population estimates shall be preferred over those estimates produced by the census bureau and used in any governmental formulae or decisions requiring population estimates.

§ 15.2-4202. Definitions:

""Population," unless a different census is clearly set forth, means the number of inhabitants according to the United States census latest preceding the time at which any provision dependent upon population is being applied, or the time as of which it is being construed, unless there is available an annual estimate of population prepared by the Weldon Cooper Center for Public Service of the University of Virginia, which has been filed with the Department of Housing and Community Development, in which event the estimate shall govern"

== Accuracy ==
In 2010 the University of Virginia Demographics and Workforce Group's Virginia county and city population estimates have been shown to be more accurate than the census bureau's. The discrepancy between the two population estimates is in large part due to Demographics and Workforce Group using an estimates methodology ratio correlation that is more applicable to Virginia's unique local government structure.
