= Housing in Virginia =

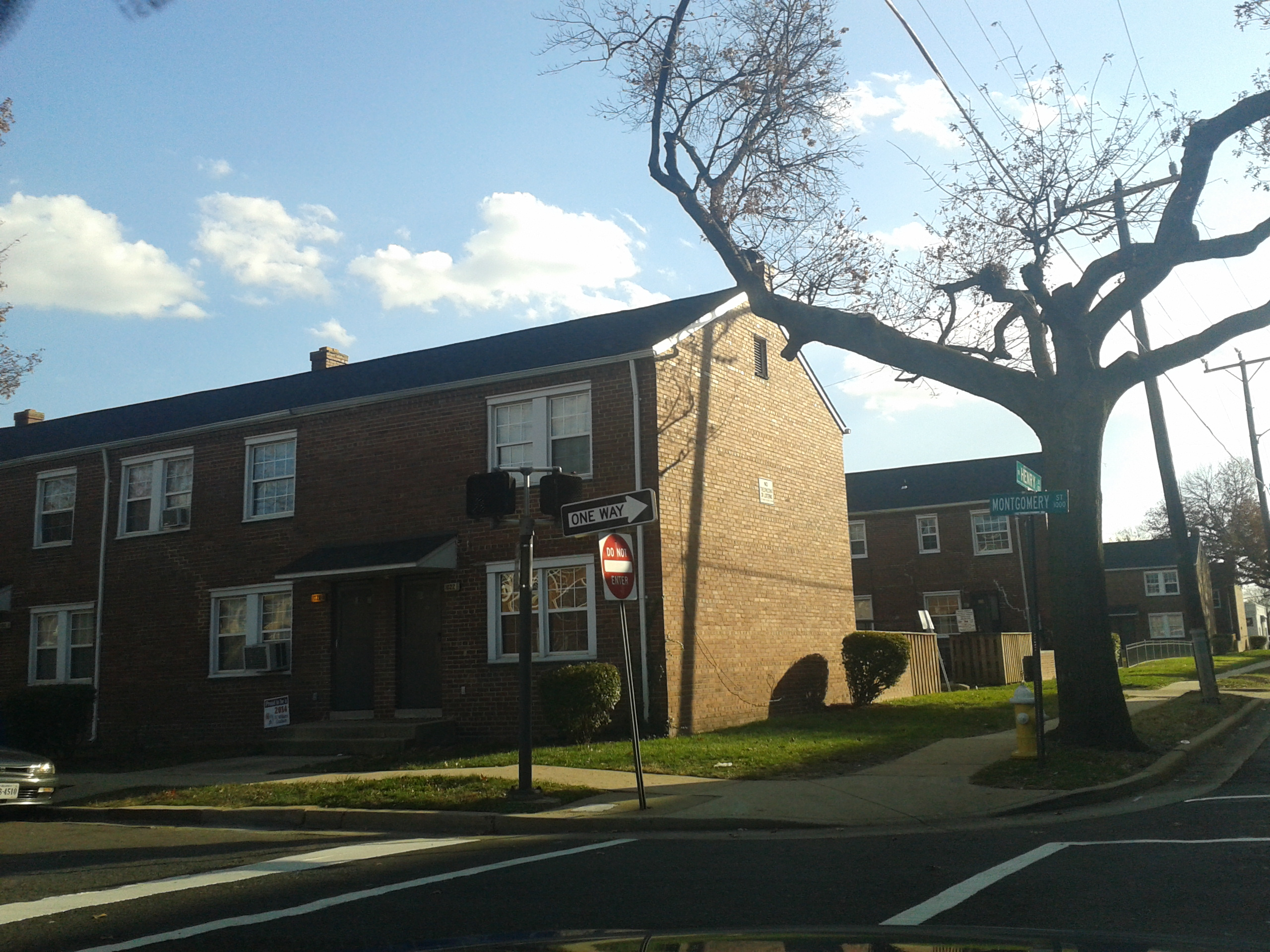
Public housing in Alexandria, Virginia

Housing in Virginia comes in a wide variety of forms, from single-family homes to apartment complexes. The rate of home ownership in the Commonwealth of Virginia was measured at 69.1% in 2023, a 2.5% increase from 2022's figure of 67.4%.

As with much of the United States, housing in Virginia is extremely commodified. As with the rest of the United States and much of the western world, Virginia has a crisis regarding housing affordability and availability. Affordability is exacerbated by estimates that over 10% of the population lives below the poverty line. The U.S. Census Bureau reported in 2023 that the median cost for rent is $1,440, around $300 lower than the US average of $1,739.

== Types of housing ==
=== Affordable ===
Mostly an issue in major urban centers such as Alexandria and Virginia Beach, affordable (or low-income) housing is housing that is cheaper than the market in order to provide a home for people that have low income. Those most likely to be affected by the lack in affordable housing, a Joint Legislative Audit and Review Commission (JLARC) study found, were renters, with low incomes, that live in urban centers, and work in common and essential occupations.

The study reported that 67% of cost-burdened households live in major population centers like Northern Virginia and Hampton Roads, with the majority of them being in Hampton Roads than the rest of the state. The most likely professions to need affordable housing were home health aides ($22,000 salary), teaching assistants ($29,000 salary), bus drivers ($45,000 salary), and social workers ($51,000 salary). The same study further reported that the state has a shortage of at least 200,000 affordable housing units.

=== Apartment ===
Larger apartment buildings are the second-largest group of houses to have been constructed in the past decade, only behind single-family homes. Multi-family apartments account for less than one in every four homes in Virginia. Almost half of renters (46%) live in large apartment complexes with five or more units. These apartments are more likely to be leased rather than owned; only 5% of owners live in multifamily buildings.

The increase in the construction of apartments is most noticeable in Northern Virginia, Richmond, and Hampton Roads. However, as of 2020, they were still behind four of Virginia's six small housing markets in terms of multi-family apartments. Since 2010, the construction of apartments has been largest in the Blacksburg-Christiansburg, Roanoke, and Lynchburg areas. In 2020, more than three-quarters of all new homes in the Blacksburg-Christiansburg area were apartments, most likely due to an influx of graduates from Virginia Tech and Radford University.

=== Single-family ===
A majority of Virginians live in single-family homes, and they make up nearly all newly built homes in the commonwealth. The rate of single-family home production has more than tripled that of multi-family home production. Compared to other states, it has the 9th largest amount of single-family homes. This extends into the neighboring state of North Carolina, even going throughout much of the rural Piedmont Crescent. A majority of these are in suburban markets, with most of them being built before 2008 (due to the 2008 housing crisis). A joint study by Virginia Housing and the Virginia Department of Housing and Community Development (DHCD) found that for every home built in an urban core of a small or rural city, more than three single-family homes were built in suburbs. To further this, over 94% of owned houses in Virginia have a porch, deck, or patio of some sort.

=== Townhouse ===
Townhouses have only been a fraction of Virginia's newly constructed houses in the past decade, despite being the most affordable to construct. According to the Richmond Association of Realtors, the median sales price of a townhouse in the Richmond metro area was $388,000 in September 2024. The average sales price was around $405,000, a 4,3% difference. There were 347 new listings for townhouses in September 2024, but only 272 were pending, and 226 of those were closed. Similar to apartments, lots of townhouses have been built in the Blacksburg-Christiansburg area due to an influx of graduates from schools such as Virginia Tech and Radford University.

== Challenges to housing availability ==
=== Cost of living ===
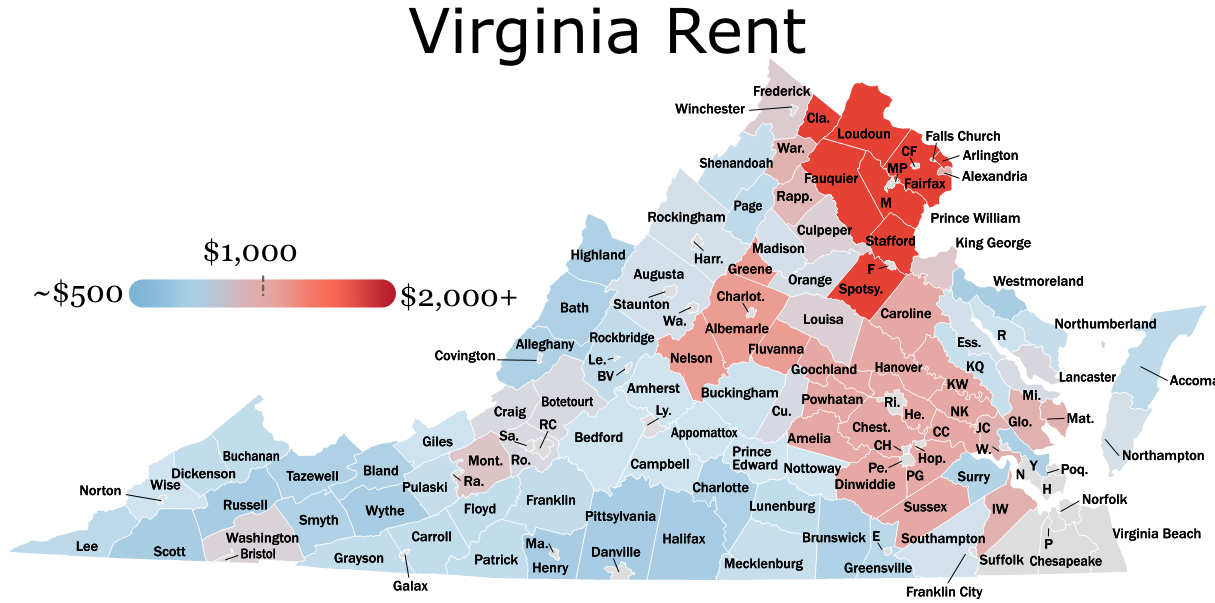
Infographic showing the cost of rent in across Virginia's counties and cities

In Virginia, around 264 thousand renter households (24%) are extremely low-income. 76% of these have a severe cost burden in terms of their home. The average income for a four-person extremely low-income household is $35,110, and the annual household income need to afford a two-bedroom rental home is $62,925. The median income in Virginia is $89,931, according to the U.S. Census Bureau.

=== Shortage of housing ===
Certainly not unique across the US, Virginia's shortage of housing has led to a sharp increase in rising rents and rising home prices. Restrictive zoning has only added fuel to the fire, blocking lower-cost starter homes from being built with methods such as long permit processes and large minimum lot requirements. This prevents builders from building houses to fill the housing gap as they had done in the past.
