= Emanuel Goldenweiser =

American economist (1883–1953)

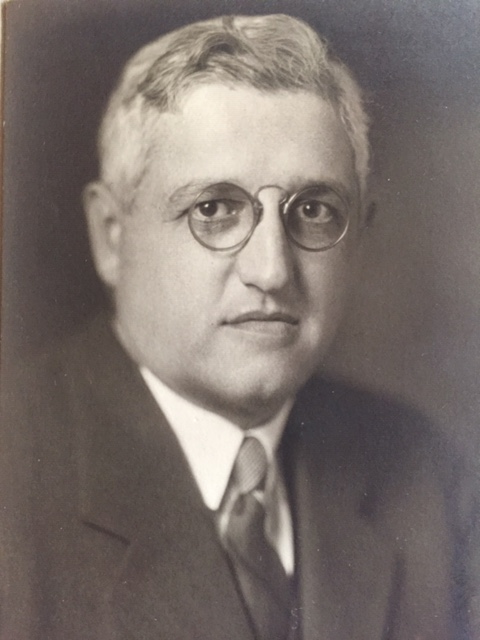
Emanuel Goldenweiser

Emanuel Alexandrovich Goldenweiser (July 31, 1883, in Kiev – March 31, 1953, in Princeton, New Jersey) was a leading American economist in the first half of the twentieth century.

Goldenweiser's father was a prominent member of the Kiev bar. The family was modestly wealthy and cosmopolitan. Upon graduation from the First Kiev Gymnasium in 1902, Emanuel followed his older brother, Alexander (Shura), to the United States. He received a BA from Columbia University in 1903, and MA from Cornell in 1905, and a PhD from Cornell in 1907. His PhD thesis subject was "Russian Immigration to the U.S." (Roughly two million Jews emigrated from Russia between 1880 and 1920; many came to the U.S.) He became a U.S. citizen in the same year.

In 1916, he married for a second time, his first marriage, to the sister of the wife of his older brother, Shura, having ended in divorce in 1912. Pearl (Ann) Allen of Luray, Virginia, and Emanuel had two children, Margaret in 1917, and Alexander (Lex) in 1922.

Goldenweiser's first position after receiving his doctorate was as a researcher for the U.S. Immigration Commission. In 1910 he was hired as a special agent for the U.S. Census Bureau, and in 1914 he went to the office of farm management in the Department of Agriculture. In 1919, Goldenweiser was hired by the Federal Reserve Bank as an associate statistician. The newly established central bank had only opened for business in mid-November 1914. The Federal Reserve was to be his employer for the rest of his long career. He was appointed assistant director of research and statistics in 1925 and director in 1926. In 1945 he was appointed economic advisor to the Board of Governors from which position he retired in 1946. In his nearly twenty years as the director of research and statistics he had a major influence on the development of U.S. monetary and banking policies, often advising the administration, congress, and the banking community. His special expertise lay in the study of bank reserves and international flows of currency and gold. (Hence, along with his last name, the nickname of "Goldie" by which he was widely known.) From 1936 to 1945 he served as economic advisor to the Federal Open Market Committee. He created numerous series of economic statistics and developed new techniques to describe and manage the economy. The Glass-Steagall bill was passed in 1935, based on testimony provided by Marriner Eccles, governor of the Federal Reserve Board, and Goldenweiser, "his able director of research....with 15 years of experience with Federal Reserve facts, figures, problems, policies and action during good times and bad," as noted in an August 20, 1935 article by Warren Persons. The good and bad times Dr. Persons refer to include the financial aftermath of WWI, the Great Depression, and the unusual capital flows into the U.S. preceding the entry of the U.S. into WWII. Following the war, Goldenweiser continued to have a prominent voice in on-going concerns regarding the great accumulation of gold in the U.S. before and during the war, dealing with inflation as a potential result of the gold accumulation, and the general stabilization of trade and money flows in the aftermath of the war.

Goldenweiser fostered economic cooperation between the various agencies of government. In his obituary in The American Statistician, of June–July, 1953, Woodlief Thomas says that, "His contributions to cooperative efforts in coordinating Governmental statistical and economic research activities were almost continuous, including membership in the Central Statistical Board and other interdepartmental groups."

He played an active role in the development of the Bretton Woods Agreements and was a delegate to the Bretton Woods Conference in 1944, making an important contribution to the establishment of the International Monetary Fund and the World Bank. He was a member of the International Institute of Statistics and a founding member and active participant in The Round Table, a group of about thirty prominent Washington thinkers who met every three weeks for thirty years. He served as president of the American Statistical Association in 1943 and the American Economic Association in 1946.

In the July 1944 issue of The Southern Banker, the editor observes that "Dr. Goldenweiser for many years has borne the title of director of research and statistics but his voice carries greater weight than the voice of an ordinary statistician. His views in fact constitute the backlog of the board of governors' economic policies." An article published in the June 1945 issue of Nation's Business stated that, "More perhaps than any other single person Dr. E.A. Goldenweiser influences Uncle Sam's thinking and action on economic and financial matters."

Despite his significant influence on economic and financial issues facing the nation, Goldenweiser preferred to remain as inconspicuous as possible, a characteristic noted in a number of the tributes to his achievements in various publications at the time of his retirement. The Washington Post, in the January 13, 1946 issue, says that, "It is unusual, however, to have contributed so much to public policy and to the minds and works of others over so long a span and retain the anonymity Dr. Goldenweiser has enjoyed....he has succeeded, for the most part, in staying in the background—which is notable for one who has had a marked influence, who was born with wit and acquired wisdom and who is no shrinking Milquetoast."

After his retirement from the Federal Reserve, he became a member of the Institute for Advanced Study in Princeton, New Jersey. He left the Institute in 1949 but continued to live in Princeton, consulting on monetary and economic policy to the Committee for Economic Development, among others, and writing, until his death on March 31, 1953, at the Princeton Hospital.

Goldenweiser was named a Fellow of the American Statistical Association in 1921.

== Bibliography ==
- E. A. Goldenweiser (1951). American Monetary Policy. MacGraw-Hill Book Company.
- E. A. Goldenweiser (1949). Monetary Management. MacGraw-Hill Book Company.
- E. A. Goldenweiser; Everett E. Hagen; Frank R. Garfield (August 1945). "Jobs, Production, and Living Standards". Postwar Economic Studies. No. 1. Federal Reserve Board.
- Emanuel Alexandrovich Goldenweiser (1925). Federal Reserve System in Operation. MacGraw-Hill Book Company.
- Emanuel Alexandrovich Goldenweiser; Leon Edgar Truesdell (1924). Farm Tenancy in the United States: An Analysis of the Results of the 1920 Census Relative to Farms Classified by Tenure Supplemented by Pertinent Data from Other Sources. U.S. Government Printing Office.
- Joseph Adna Hill; Lewis Meriam; Emanuel Alexandrovich Goldenweiser (1915). Paupers in Almhouses, 1910. Bureau of the Census, U.S. Government Printing Office.
- Milton Friedman; Anna Jacobson Schwartz (1971). A Monetary History of the United States, 1867–1960. Princeton University Press.
- Family archives.
- Numerous articles in the Federal Reserve Bulletin, the American Economic Review and other publications.
- Many articles, files and other memoranda are in the custody of the Library of Congress under Acs. 10,808 II-39-F, 4–5.
