= American Community Survey =

Demographic survey in the United States

- Frequency: Annually
- Locations: 4600 Silver Hill Road, Suitland, Maryland, U.S.
- Country: U.S.
- Inaugurated: January 2005; 21 years ago
- Participants: 3.5 million households/year
- Major events: Survey
- Website: census.gov/acs

The American Community Survey (ACS) is an annual demographics survey program conducted by the United States Census Bureau. It regularly gathers information previously contained only in the long form of the decennial census, including ancestry, US citizenship status, educational attainment, income, language proficiency, migration, disability, employment, and housing characteristics. None of the respondents' personal information is released, and it is only used statistically in these data, which are used by many public-sector, private-sector, and not-for-profit stakeholders to allocate funding, track shifting demographics, plan for emergencies, and learn about local communities.

Sent to approximately 295,000 addresses monthly, or 3.5 million addresses annually, it is the largest household survey that the Census Bureau administers.

The American Community Survey gathers information annually in the 50 U.S. states and Washington, D.C. Data is also collected in Puerto Rico via the Puerto Rico Community Survey (PRCS), which is part of the ACS. (Note: The U.S. Census has a separate form for Puerto Rico called the Puerto Rico Community Survey, (PRCS). Despite the different form, the U.S. Census Bureau website states that "The PRCS is part of the ACS". A question linking the PCRS with the ACS is if the respondent lived in Puerto Rico should they respond that they have resided in their current residence in the CONUS (or Alaska or Hawaii) for one year or less. The questions asked are different from the questions in the ACS.) It does not gather information on the other four major U.S. Island areas: American Samoa, Guam, Northern Mariana Islands in the western Pacific Ocean, and the U.S. Virgin Islands in the Caribbean Sea.

== History ==
Article I, Section II of the Constitution of the United States of 1787, adopted in 1788, requires an enumeration of the population every ten years "in such Manner as they (Congress) shall by Law direct". From the first United States decennial census three years later in 1790, congressional legislators understood that it should also collect basic demographic information beyond just the number of people in the household. James Madison, an American Founding Father and the fourth president of the United States, first proposed including additional questions in the U.S. decennial census to "enable them to adapt the public measures to the particular circumstances of the community". Such knowledge collected with each census, President Madison argued, "would give them an opportunity of marking the progress of the society". The questions included in censuses since 1790 have reflected American understandings of and concerns about societal trends and the growing nation's expanded data needs.

By 130 years later in 1940, advancements in statistical methods and knowledge enabled the administrators and statisticians/mathematicians of the United States Census Bureau (Bureau of the Census), first established in 1902 within the United States Department of Commerce, to begin asking a sample of the American population a sub-set of additional detailed questions without unduly increasing cost or respondent burden. In the decades that followed, new questions were added to those that had previously been asked of all respondents, and all the questions were moved to the sample questionnaire form. As the sample form grew longer than the census form itself, it became known as the census "long form".

Following the 1960 U.S. decennial census, federal, state, and local governmental officials and some in the private sector began demanding more timely long-form-type data. Lawmakers representing rural districts claimed they were at a data disadvantage, unable to self-fund additional surveys of their populations. Congress explored the creation of a mid-decade census, holding hearings and even authorizing a special mid-decade census in the American Bicentennial year of 1976, but not funding it.

Efforts to obtain data on a more frequent basis began again after the 1990 U.S. decennial census when it became clear that the more burdensome long form was depressing overall census response rates and jeopardizing the accuracy of the count. At the Congress's request, the U.S. Census Bureau in the United States Department of Commerce developed and tested a new design to obtain long-form data. Noted U.S. statistician/mathematician Leslie Kish had introduced the concept of a rolling sample (or continuous measurement) design in 1981. This design featured ongoing, monthly data collection aggregated every year, enabling annual data releases. By combining multiple years of this data, the Census Bureau could release "period" estimates to produce estimates for smaller areas. After a decade of testing, it launched as the American Community Survey in 2005, replacing the once-a-decade census long form.

== Implementation ==
The American Community Survey initially sampled approximately 3.5 million housing unit addresses and group quarters in the United States. The Census Bureau selects a random sample of addresses to be included in the ACS. Each address has about a 1-in-480 chance of being selected in a given month, and no address should be selected more than once every five years. Data is collected by internet, mail, telephone interviews, and in-person interviews. The questionnaire is available in English and Spanish, with assistance provided in additional languages. Approximately one-third of those who do not respond to the survey by mail or telephone are randomly selected for in-person interviews. About 95 percent of households across all response modes ultimately participate in the survey.

Like the decennial census, ACS responses are confidential. Every employee at the Census Bureau takes an oath of nondisclosure and is sworn for life to not disclose identifying information. Violations of the nondisclosure oath are punishable by prison sentences of up to five years and/or a $250,000 fine. Under 13 U.S.C. § 9, census responses are "immune from the legal process" and may not "be admitted as evidence or used for any purpose in any action, suit, or another judicial or administrative proceeding".

== Data availability ==
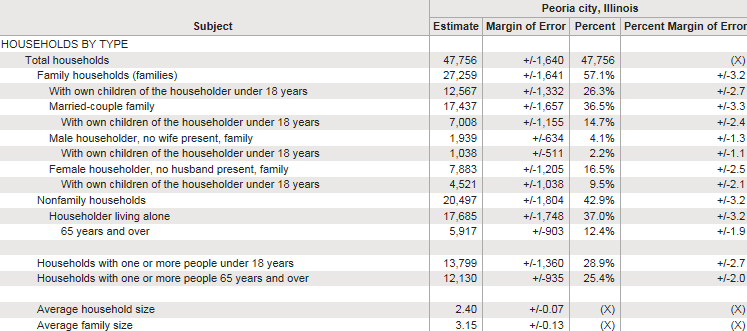
An American Community Survey data table sample

The Census Bureau aggregates individual ACS responses, also known as microdata, into estimates at many geographic summary levels. Among these summary levels are legal and administrative entities such as states, counties, cities, and congressional districts, as well as statistical entities such as metropolitan statistical areas, tracts, block groups, and census-designated places. Estimates for census blocks are not available from ACS. Puerto Rico is the only US territory that is part of the ACS program.

To balance geographic resolution, temporal frequency, statistical significance, and respondent privacy, ACS estimates released each year are aggregated from responses received in the previous calendar year or the previous five calendar years. The Census Bureau provides guidance for data users about which data set to use when analyzing different population and geography sizes.

From 2007 to 2013, three-year estimates were available for areas with 20,000 people or more. This data product was discontinued in 2015 due to budget cuts. The last 3-year release was the 2011–2013 ACS 3-year estimates.

Current data releases include:

- 1-year estimates are available for areas with a population of at least 65,000 people. The 2015 ACS 1-year estimates were released in 2016 and summarize responses received in 2015 for all states but only 26% of counties due to the 65,000 minimum population threshold. This is most suitable for data users interested in shorter-term changes at medium to large geographic scales.
- Supplemental estimates are shown in annual tables summarizing populations for geographies with populations of 20,000 or more.
- 5-year estimates are available for areas down to the block group scale, on the order of 600 to 3000 people. The 2015 ACS 5-year estimates, summarizing data from 2011 to 2015, were released in 2016.

Over the past decade, the American Community Survey has collected and supplied all data at local levels. This was a large breakthrough in the survey because it allowed American citizens to more individualized data on a community level as opposed to extrapolating from data collected over a larger area. It has also provided unparalleled information to be more accessible for local government planning and financing. Many conclusions for local data are averaged from various information across the area, but it is not always an adequate representation.

ACS estimates are available via several online data tools. U.S. Census website (AFF) is the primary tool for disseminating ACS data, allowing users to drill down to specific tables and geographies (starting with 2013 estimates, AFF also includes block group data). A selection of the most popular tables is shown in QuickFacts. Other tools include OnTheMap for Emergency Management, Census Business Builder and My Congressional District. My Tribal Area featuring 5-year estimates for federally recognized tribes, launched in 2017. The Summary File is the most detailed data source and is available as a series of downloadable text files or through an application programming interface (API) for software developers.

Custom cross-tabulations of ACS questions can be made using the Public Use Microdata Sample (PUMS), freely accessible through the Census Bureau website and the Integrated Public Use Microdata Series. PUMS data contain responses to every question from a sample of respondents. To protect respondent privacy, PUMS data are anonymized and only available down to areas containing 100,000 people or more known as Public Use Microdata Areas (PUMAs). The analysis of all ACS microdata without the sampling and anonymization in PUMS is restricted to qualified researchers at secure Federal Statistical Research Data Centers (FSRDCs).

== Research studies ==
The Census Bureau conducts research and evaluation projects, including survey methodology research, important for the improvement of the ACS.

The ACS data is used by researchers to examine societal changes, study data quality, and conduct methodological research.

== Controversy ==
=== Support ===
American Community Survey data provides important information that cannot be found elsewhere. The federal government, as well as various businesses, researchers, and local governments, use ACS data for planning and decision-making purposes. ACS data are used by public and business decision-makers to more clearly identify issues and opportunities and more effectively allocate scarce resources to address them. In Fiscal Year 2008, 184 federal domestic assistance programs used ACS-related datasets to help guide the distribution of $416 billion, 29 percent of all federal assistance.

The American Community Survey is authorized by 13 U.S.C. § 141 and 13 U.S.C. § 193. Federal courts have held that the long form is constitutional.

In 2000, the U.S. District Court for the Southern District of Texas ruled that the 2000 U.S. Decennial Census and its questions did not violate the Fourth Amendment of the United States Constitution or any other constitutional provisions that were alleged in the federal lawsuit initiated by the plaintiffs. The federal district court said responses to census questions are not a violation of an American citizen's right to privacy or free speech.

The U.S. District Court's decision in Texas was later affirmed by the higher United States Court of Appeals for the Fifth Circuit on appeal, and the Supreme Court of the United States denied the petition for a writ of certiorari. Several other courts, including the U.S. Supreme Court, have held through the years that the census and the questions in the census are authorized by both the Constitution and Congressional statute.

In 2002, the General Accounting Office confirmed that the U.S. Census Bureau has the authority to conduct the survey and "require responses from the public". All individual American Community Survey responses are kept private and are used (along with other ACS responses) to create estimates of demographic characteristics for various geographies. Because of data swapping techniques to ensure confidentiality, it is impossible to figure out how individual people responded based on data from published ACS estimates.

=== Opposition ===
Opponents of the American Community Survey disagree with the court's findings about its constitutionality, contending that the survey asks for more information and at a higher frequency than the simple enumeration authorized and required by Article 1, Section 2 of the U.S. Constitution. Despite the Government Accountability Office's conclusion that the U.S. Census Bureau has the authority to the survey under 13 U.S.C. § 141 and 13 U.S.C. § 193, several US representatives have challenged the ACS as unauthorized by the Census Act and a violation of the Right to Financial Privacy Act. U.S. Representative (congressman) Ron Paul of Texas, who opposes ACS, said that the founding fathers of the United States "never authorized the federal government to continuously survey the American people".

Those who decline to complete the survey may receive visits to their homes from Census Bureau personnel. Because it is a mandatory survey, it is governed by federal laws that could impose a fine of as much as $5,000 on those who flagrantly refuse to participate.

To date, no person has been prosecuted for refusing to answer the ACS. Kenneth Prewitt, the former director of the U.S. Census Bureau, said in March 2000 that the United States Department of Commerce is "not an enforcement agency" and that the parallel United States Department of Justice in the presidential cabinet would be responsible for prosecuting violations, adding that "we don't recommend that". The Census Bureau prefers to gain cooperation by convincing respondents of the importance of participation while acknowledging that the mandate improves response rates (and thus accuracy) and lowers the annual cost of survey administration by more than $90 million.

In 2014, the Census Project, a collaboration of pro-census business and industry associations, gathered signatures from 96 national and local organizations urging the U.S. House of Representatives Committee on Oversight and Government Reform to reject a proposal to make the American Community Survey voluntary. Signers included the U.S. Chamber of Commerce, the National Association of Realtors, and the U.S. Conference of Mayors. The letter cited results from a congressionally mandated test of a voluntary ACS that found that mail response rates would drop "dramatically," by more than 20 percentage points. The resulting loss in quality and reliability would essentially eliminate data for 41 percent of US counties, small cities, towns and villages, many school districts, neighborhoods, remote areas, and American Indian reservations.

== See also ==
- List of household surveys in the United States
- 2011 long-form Canadian census and its successor the National Household Survey
