= Consumer unit (economics) =

In economics, a consumer unit is defined as either (1) all members of a particular household who are related by blood, marriage, adoption, or other legal arrangements; (2) a person living alone or sharing a household with others or living as a roomer in a private home or lodging house or in permanent living quarters in a hotel or motel, but who is financially independent; or (3) two or more persons living together who pool their income to make joint expenditure decisions. Financial independence is determined by the three major expense categories: housing, food, and other living expenses. To be considered financially independent, a respondent must provide at least two of the three major expense categories.

== See also ==
- Bureau of Labor Statistics
- Consumer Expenditure Survey
