= Survey of Income and Program Participation =

Census survey

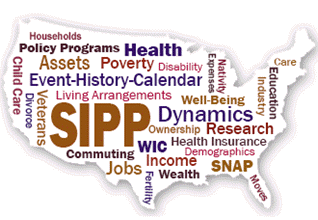
https://www.census.gov/sipp/

The Survey of Income and Program Participation (SIPP) is a statistical survey conducted by the U.S. Census Bureau. The SIPP is designed to provide accurate and comprehensive information about the incomes of American individuals and households and their participation in income transfer programs.

The survey's mission is to provide a nationally representative sample for evaluating annual and sub-annual income dynamics, movements into and out of government transfer programs, family and social context of individuals and households, and interactions among these items. A major use of the SIPP has been to evaluate the use of and eligibility for government programs and to analyze the impacts of options for modifying them.

SIPP data are used to evaluate the effectiveness of Federal, state, and local government programs.

== Methods ==
The SIPP gathers information from a series of panels, each with 14,000 to 37,000 households. Each panel lasts from 2.5 to 4 years. The SIPP sample is a multistage-stratified sample of the U.S. civilian non-institutionalized population. The respondents are all household members 15 years or older.

Each wave of interviews lasts four months. Interviews are conducted by personal visits and telephone calls.

Certain core questions are asked in every survey. Respondents are asked whether or not they participate in the labor force, what government programs they participated in, and about their incomes. Additional “topical modules” are added to the SIPP survey sometimes with questions on personal history, child care, wealth, program eligibility, child support, disability, school enrollment, taxes, and annual income.

The Census Bureau sponsors the survey under the authority of Title 13 of the United States Code, Section 182. The SIPP was developed from the Income Survey Development Program, conducted between 1977 and 1981, which developed survey data collection strategies and instruments as well as data processing strategies for the SIPP.

Statistics Canada conducted an analogous survey, the Survey of Labour and Income Dynamics (SLID), a longitudinal study following each of a panel of 15,000 households for 6 years, from 1993 until 2011. This was replaced by the cross-sectional Canadian Income Survey in 2012.

== Content ==
While the main objective of SIPP is to provide accurate and comprehensive information about the income and program participation of individuals and households in the United States, SIPP also collects extensive data on many additional factors of economic well-being. Financial situations of households and individuals are not solely determined by their employment status and income. In order to create a more complete representation of national well-being, SIPP also collects extensive information concerning family dynamics, educational attainment, housing expenditures, asset ownership, health insurance, disability, childcare, and food security. These data put the income and program recipiency of individuals and households into the family and social context. Thus, researchers may examine the ways in which these factors interact to influence financial well-being and movement into or out-of government assistance programs.

== Uses ==
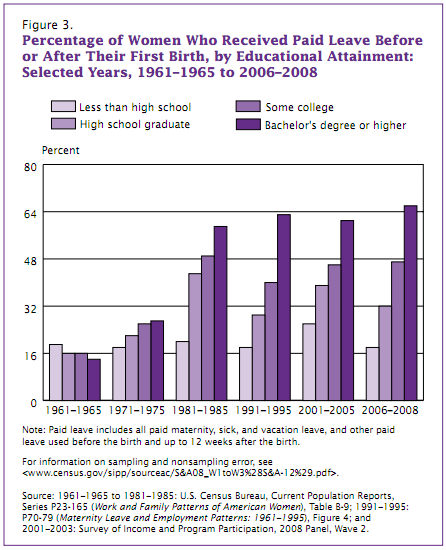
https://www.census.gov/prod/2011pubs/p70-128.pdf

The main objective of the SIPP is to provide accurate and comprehensive information about the income and program participation of individuals and households in the United States.

The survey's mission is to provide a nationally representative sample for evaluating: 1. annual and sub-annual income dynamics, 2. movement into and out of government transfer or assistance programs, and 3. effects of our changing family and social situations for individuals and households.

A major use of the SIPP has been to evaluate the use of and eligibility for government programs and to analyze the impacts of modifications to those programs. These kinds of information help in evaluating the economic status of the nation, show how things change, and give policy makers the facts that enable them to make better economic decisions.

SIPP produces national-level estimates for the U.S. resident population and subgroups. Although the SIPP design allows for both longitudinal and cross-sectional data analysis, SIPP is intended to primarily to support longitudinal studies. SIPP's longitudinal features allow the analysis of selected dynamic characteristics of the population, such as changes in income, eligibility for and participation in transfer programs, household and family composition, labor force behavior, and other associated events.

One of the most important reasons for conducting SIPP is to gather detailed information on participation in transfer programs. Data from SIPP allow analysts to examine concurrent participation in multiple programs. SIPP data can also be used to address the following types of questions:

- How have changes in eligibility rules or benefit levels affected recipients?
- How have changes in the eligibility rules affected the program target population, that is, those eligible to receive benefits?
- How does income from other household members affect labor force participation and reasons for not working?
- How do wealth and income patterns differ for various age, gender, and racial groups?

Because SIPP is a longitudinal survey, capturing changes in household and family composition over a multiyear period, it can also be used to address the following questions:

- What factors affect change in household and family structure and living arrangements?
- What are the interactions between changes in the structure of households and families and the distribution of income?
- What effects do changes in household composition have on economic status and program eligibility?
- What are the primary determinants of turnover in programs such as Food Stamps?
- What factors affect change in household and family structure and living arrangements?

== Re-engineered SIPP ==
In response to budget pressures, the Survey of Income and Program Participation nearly ceased to exist in 2006. The survey, then beginning the process to convert the existing instrument format to more modern software, suspended the instrument conversion and prepared to shut down operations. The strident backlash and public petition from the public policy, academic, and partner agency communities led a large contingent of Senators and Representatives from Congress to endorse the petition to request the reinstatement of SIPP's funding. With funding restored, the US Census Bureau began re-engineering the SIPP. The re-engineering focused on several key goals, including reducing burden on respondents, reducing program costs, improving accuracy, improving timeliness and accessibility, and improving relevance. The SIPP stakeholders and data users have been, and continue to be, critical partners for the SIPP program.

== Social Security Administration (SSA) Supplement ==
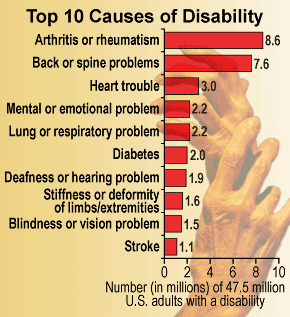
Census Survey of Income and Program Participation

The U.S. Census Bureau conducted the Social Security Administration Supplement on Retirement, Pensions, and Related Content (SSA Supplement) on behalf of the SSA. The SSA Supplement is a separate survey from the Survey of Income and Program Participation (SIPP), even though the sample includes households that completed 2014 Wave 1 SIPP interviews. The topics included in the SSA Supplement are from previous SIPP panel topical modules.

Topics included in the SSA Supplement:

- Personal retirement plan contributions and withdrawals
- Participation in pension and retirement plans provided by an employer or business
- Marital history
- Health status
- Work, Adult, and Child disabilities

The 2014 SIPP removed these topics in order to reduce overall respondent burden since it is not necessary to ask them each wave. However, the SSA still needs the data from these topics to analyze the economic and social situation of people with disabilities and people in or approaching retirement. Examples include adjusting the age for retirement benefits, assessing people's ability to save for retirement, estimating the number of legally eligible people for Social Security divorce benefits, and evaluating and modifying the disability criteria for Supplemental Security Income (SSI) eligibility.

The SSA Supplement was a one-time survey conducted after Wave 1 of the 2014 SIPP panel, from September through November 2014. All interviews were conducted by centralized telephone – there was no personal visit component.

== See also ==
- List of household surveys in the United States
