= Goldenweiser =

Goldenweiser is a surname. Notable people with the surname include:

- Aleksandr Goldenweiser (1875-1961), Russian pianist, teacher and composer
- Alexander Goldenweiser (anthropologist) (1880-1940), Russian-born U.S. anthropologist and sociologist
- Emanuel Goldenweiser (1883-1953), Russian-born American economist
