= List of household surveys in the United States =

This is a list of surveys of households in the United States.

== 10,000+ participants ==
Survey	Conducted by	Main target	Number of people	Data collection started	Ongoing, or year data collection ended	Main topics	Current modes of data collection
United States census	United States Census Bureau	All persons dwelling in U.S. residential structures, and many homeless	309 million people in 2010	1790	Ongoing	Age, sex and race of household members.	Internet self-response, Phone response, Mail response
American Community Survey	United States Census Bureau		3.5 million households	1994	Ongoing	Ancestry, educational attainment, income, language proficiency, migration, disability, employment, and housing characteristics	Internet self-response, Mail response
American Housing Survey	United States Census Bureau	Household members at least 16 years old	186,000	1973	Ongoing	Housing conditions and costs	Face-to-face interview format, Phone response
American Time Use Survey	Bureau of Labor Statistics		25,000	2003	Ongoing	The kinds of activities people engage in and the time they spend involved in these activities	Phone response
Current Population Survey	Bureau of Labor Statistics	Civilian noninstitutional population 16 years and older.	60,000 households	1940	Ongoing monthly	Labor force, employment, unemployment, persons not in the labor force, hours of work, earnings	Face-to-face interview format, Phone response
National Survey of Family Growth	National Center for Health Statistics division of the Centers for Disease Control and Prevention	Men and women 15–44 years of age	22,682	1973	Ongoing	Trends related to fertility, family structure, and demographics.	Face-to-face interview format, with a portion of the more sensitive questions answered privately by self-administration
Panel Study of Income Dynamics	University of Michigan	Nationally representative individuals	18,000+	1968	Ongoing	Including employment, income, wealth, expenditures, health, education, marriage, childbearing and philanthropy	Phone response, Face-to-face interview format
National Crime Victimization Survey	Bureau of Justice Statistics	Nationally representative sample	160,000	1973	Ongoing	Factors associated with becoming a victim of various crimes.	Face-to-face interview format with subsequent interviews conducted either in person or by phone
National Health Interview Survey	National Center for Health Statistics	Nationally representative sample	87,000	1957	Ongoing	Health status and utilization	Face-to-face interview format
National Longitudinal Survey	Bureau of Labor Statistics	People born 1957-1964 and 1980-1984	50,000+	1966	Ongoing	Education, employment, household, parents and children, family process, partnerships, fertility, health, attitudes, expectations, non-cognitive tests, activities, crime & substance use	Face-to-face interview format with a portion of the more sensitive questions answered privately by audio computer-assisted self-interview
National Survey of College Graduates	United States Census Bureau	Recipients of a bachelor's degree or higher	100,000			Occupation, work activities, salary, the relationship of degree field and occupation, and demographic information.	Internet self-response, Phone response, Mail response
National Survey of Fishing, Hunting, and Wildlife-Associated Recreation	United States Fish and Wildlife Service		60,000			Fishing, hunting, and other wildlife-associated recreation, such as wildlife observation, photography, and feeding.	Phone response, Face-to-face interview format
Survey of Income and Program Participation	United States Census Bureau		37,000 households			Economic well-being, family dynamics, education, assets, health insurance, childcare, and food security.	Phone response, Face-to-face interview format
Telephone Point-of-Purchase Survey	Bureau of Labor Statistics		175,000			Where Americans are spending their money	Phone response

== 1,000 to 9,999 participants ==
Survey	Conducted by	Main target	Number of people	Data collection started	Ongoing, or year data collection ended	Main topics
American Family Survey	Deseret News and The Center for the Study of Elections and Democracy at Brigham Young University	Nationally representative sample	3,000 participants	2015	2015	Attitudes, practices & policy opinions of marriage and family
Survey of Household Economics and Decisionmaking	Federal Reserve Board of Governors		around 6,000 respondents	2013	Ongoing	Well-being of American households, potential risks to their financial stability
Youth Volunteering and Civic Engagement Survey	Corporation for National and Community Service		8,000 participants			
