= School division =

Type of school district

A school division is a geographic division over which a school board has jurisdiction.

== Canada ==
In Canada the term is used for the area controlled by a school board and is used interchangeably with school district, including in the formal name of the board. For example, see List of Alberta school boards.

== United States ==
In the U.S. state of Virginia, the State Board of Education is charged under § 22.1-25 of the Code of Virginia with dividing the state into school divisions. A school division is typically coextensive with a county or independent city, although it is also possible for a school division to comprise a city and a neighboring county (e.g., Williamsburg and James City County) or a single town (e.g., West Point).

Although the term "school district" is popularly used, a school division in Virginia differs from a school district in most states in the following key respect. Unlike school districts in most states, a Virginia school division is not a separate local government, but instead depends on appropriations and budget approvals from its associated general-purpose local government or governments (county, city, town). Legally, it is a political subdivision of the Commonwealth of Virginia.

Virginia statute authorizes a school division to contract with a neighboring school division for school functions. One example of such an arrangement is in Northern Virginia, where the City of Fairfax has contracted with surrounding Fairfax County to run the schools owned by the city (see Fairfax County Public Schools).

== See also ==
- List of school divisions in Virginia
