= Consumer Expenditure Survey =

US Bureau of Labor Statistics household survey

The Consumer Expenditure Survey (CE or CEX) is a Bureau of Labor Statistics (BLS) household survey that collects information on the buying habits of U.S. consumers. The program consists of two components — the Interview Survey and the Diary Survey — each with its own sample. The surveys collect data on expenditures, income, and consumer unit characteristics. In May 2020, the American Association for Public Opinion Research recognized the CE program with its 2020 Policy Impact Award, for joint work by the BLS -- including CE and the Division of Price and Index Number Research -- and the Census Bureau on the Supplemental Poverty thresholds and measure, and the essential contributions these data products have made to the understanding, discussion, and advancement of public policy related to the alleviation of poverty in the United States.

== Interview Survey ==
For the Interview Survey, each consumer unit is interviewed once per quarter, for four consecutive quarters. This survey is designed to capture large purchases, such as spending on rent, property, vehicles and expenses that occur on a regular basis such as rent or utilities. Since April 2003, data have been collected using a Computer Assisted Personal Interview (CAPI). Prior to that, interviews were administered using paper and pencil. An example of the most recent CAPI instrument is available on the Consumer Expenditure Survey website.

== Diary Survey ==
The Diary Survey is self-administered, and each consumer unit keeps a diary for two one-week periods. This survey is meant to capture small, frequently purchased items and allows respondents to record all purchases such as spending for food and beverages, tobacco, personal care products, and nonprescription drugs and supplies. The most recent Diary Survey form is available on the Consumer Expenditure Survey website.

== Consumer Unit ==
A consumer unit consists of any of the following: (1) All members of a particular household who are related by blood, marriage, adoption, or other legal arrangements; (2) a person living alone or sharing a household with others or living as a roomer in a private home or lodging house or in permanent living quarters in a hotel or motel, but who is financially independent; or (3) two or more persons living together who use their incomes to make joint expenditure decisions. Financial independence is determined by spending behavior with regard to the three major expense categories: Housing, food, and other living expenses. To be considered financially independent, the respondent must provide at least two of the three major expenditure categories, either entirely or in part.

The terms consumer unit, family, and household are often used interchangeably for convenience. However, the proper technical term for purposes of the Consumer Expenditure Survey is consumer unit.

== Integrated Results ==
Data from the Interview Survey and the Diary Survey are combined to provide a complete account of expenditures and income. In some cases data are unique to a particular survey. For example, the Diary Survey provides greater detail of food expenditures than the Interview Survey, and the Interview Survey collects data on automobile repairs which are not found in the Diary Survey. For items collected in both surveys the BLS selects which data to use by statistical methods.

== Survey Sample ==
The Consumer Expenditure Survey is designed to be representative of the entire U.S. civilian non-institutionalized population, and includes both urban and rural areas. The primary sampling frame is the Census Bureau’s Master Address File (MAF). That file has all residential addresses identified in the 2010 census and is updated twice per year with the U.S. Postal Service’s Delivery Sequence File. The data are collected for the BLS by the United States Census Bureau. Approximately 7,000 usable interviews are collected from the Interview Survey each quarter and approximately 14,000 usable diaries are collected for the Diary Survey per year. In 2013, the response rate was 65 percent for the Diary Survey and 65 percent for the Interview Survey.

== Confidentiality ==
Personal information such as names, addresses, and phone numbers are never published. Data collected from the survey are protected by Title 13 of the United States Code. Each person with access to confidential information, including US Census Bureau field representatives and BLS employees, are sworn for life to protect this information. Violations of the law are a felony punishable by a prison sentence of up to five years and a fine of up to $250,000.

== Data ==
=== Recent Data ===
According to a BLS news release on September 9, 2020, average annual expenditures for all consumer units in 2019 were $63,036, a 3.0-percent increase from 2018, the U.S. Bureau of Labor Statistics reported today. During the same period, the Consumer Price Index (CPI-U) rose 1.8 percent and average income before taxes increased 5.4 percent.

Accompanying 2019 annual data tables were also posted on the CE website on September 9, 2020. The next release of midyear data will be in April 2021.

=== Uses of Survey Data ===
These data from the Consumer Expenditure Survey are used in a number of different ways by a variety of users. One important use of the survey is for the periodic revision of the Bureau of Labor Statistics’ Consumer Price Index (CPI). The Bureau uses survey results to select new market baskets of goods and services for the CPI every two years, to determine the relative importance of CPI components, and to derive new cost weights for the market baskets. Working with the U.S. Census Bureau, Consumer Expenditure Survey data are used to calculate thresholds for the Supplemental Poverty Measure. The US Department of Agriculture uses Consumer Expenditure information in estimating the cost of raising children. Market researchers find the data useful in analyzing the demand for groups of goods and services. The data allow them to track spending trends of different types of consumer units. Government and private agencies use the data to study the welfare of particular segments of the population, such as those consumer units with a reference person aged 65 and older or under age 25, or for low-income consumer units. Economic policymakers use the data to study the impact of policy changes on the welfare of different socioeconomic groups. Researchers use the data in a variety of studies, including those that focus on the spending behavior of different family types, trends in expenditures on various expenditure components including new types of goods and services, gift-giving behavior, consumption studies, and historical spending trends.

=== Limitations ===
Both the Diary and Interview Surveys utilize a representative sample to measure the buying habits of American consumers. Only a small percentage of the U.S. population is surveyed, and therefore the data are subject to sampling errors. The division publishes standard error tables on their website. Non-sampling errors include, but are not limited to, respondents who are either unwilling or unable to provide accurate answers, mistakes made in collecting or recording obtained data, and estimation of missing data.

=== Microdata ===
Detailed annual data -- 1980 through 2019 -- for individual household/consumer units in both the Diary and Interview surveys are available for free download at the BLS Consumer Expenditure Survey website. The data are protected for confidentiality.

The Consumer Expenditure Surveys Division also hosts a free research symposium and summer microdata users' workshop at BLS headquarters in Washington, DC. The 2021 symposium followed by the workshop will be held July 20 through 23, 2021.

== History ==
The Consumer Expenditure Survey was first collected over 130 years ago in 1888. It became a continuous survey in 1980. From the late 1800s until 1980 the survey had been administered at approximately ten-year intervals. More information about the history of the Consumer Expenditure Survey is available on the program's history page.

== See also ==
- Consumer price index
