= National Survey of Fishing, Hunting, and Wildlife-Associated Recreation =

The National Survey of Fishing, Hunting, and Wildlife-Associated Recreation is a comprehensive and long-standing survey sponsored by the United States Fish and Wildlife Service since 1955. It is among the oldest and most detailed ongoing recreational surveys in the United States.

The survey collects extensive data on the number of participants in fishing, hunting, and wildlife watching activities in the U.S., including their frequency of participation and expenditure. This data is crucial for understanding trends and informing policy decisions related to natural resource management.

The most recent survey was conducted in 2022, providing updated insights into the participation and economic impact of these recreational activities.

== Data Collected ==
The survey collects information on the number of anglers, hunters, and wildlife watchers; how often they participate; and how much they spend on their activities in the United States.

=== 2022 ===
The 2022 survey operated the same as in previous years by focusing on the participation and expenditures by persons 16 years of age and older. However, data was also collected for wildlife-related recreation by persons 6-15 years of age in 2021. The findings in the survey revealed that "39.9 million people fished, 14.4 million hunted, and 148.3 million participated in at least one type of wildlife-watching activity including observing, feeding, or photographing fish and other wildlife in the United States,”. It is advised against directly comparing the results from the 2022 survey to the results from any other years due to changes in methodology and questions asked.

=== 2006 ===
The 2006 survey focused on participation and expenditures by persons 16 years of age and older. The information is presented at both the national and state level. It also provides trend information that can be directly compared with results from the 1991, 1996, and 2001 Survey reports. Due to methodological changes to improve accuracy, results from surveys conducted earlier than 1991 should not be directly compared.

=== Fishing ===
- Types: Freshwater (excluding the Great Lakes), Great Lakes, and saltwater.
- Participants: Includes licensed anglers as well as those who fish without a license or use special methods like spears.
- Metrics: Total participants, days of participation, number of trips, and expenditures.

=== Hunting ===
- Types: Big game, small game, migratory birds, and other animals.
- Participants: Includes licensed hunters using various methods (rifles, shotguns, bows, etc.) and those hunting without a license.
- Metrics: Total participants, days of participation, number of trips, and expenditures.

=== Wildlife Watching ===
- Types: Away-from-home (nonresidential) and around-the-home (residential) activities.
- Definition: Participants must have a special interest in wildlife or take trips specifically for wildlife watching. Incidental wildlife observation is not included.
- Metrics: Total participants, days of participation, number of trips, and expenditures.

=== Demographic Data ===
The survey gathers demographic information including:

- Density and size of residence
- Geographic region
- Age, sex, ethnicity, race
- Income and education levels

== Uses of the survey ==
- Federal Agencies: Use data for policy formulation, program planning, environmental impact assessments, and regulatory decisions.
- State Agencies: Employ data for program management and development in fisheries and wildlife sectors.
- Non-Federal Organizations: Conservation groups, researchers, and industry associations use data for research, planning, and advocacy.

The survey has been conducted periodically, with notable reports from:

- 1991
- 1996
- 2001
- 2006 Due to methodological changes, comparisons with earlier surveys should be made cautiously.

== See also ==
- List of household surveys in the United States
