= National Survey of Family Growth =

The National Survey of Family Growth (NSFG) is a survey conducted by the National Center for Health Statistics division of the Centers for Disease Control and Prevention to understand trends related to fertility, family structure, and demographics in the United States.

== History and details ==
The National Survey of Family Growth is conducted in five-year cycles. In each cycle, surveys are administered via personal interviews with people at homes. The interviewees generally comprise only the civilian, non-institutionalized population.

The cycles so far have been:

- Cycle 1, started 1973
- Cycle 2, started 1976
- Cycle 3, started 1982
- Cycle 4, started 1988
- Cycle 5, started 1995
- Cycle 6, started 2002
- 2006–2010 NSFG
- 2011–2013 NSFG
- 2013–2015 NSFG
- 2015–2019 NSFG

While Cycles 1–5 surveyed only women, Cycle 6 and later surveyed both men and women and used households as the unit of analysis. Cycle 6 surveyed 12,571 respondents 15–44 years of age: 7,643 females and 4,928 males. The 2006–2010 NSFG surveyed 22,682 interviews: over 10,000 interviews with men and more than 12,000 interviews with women. In 2006, the NSFG shifted from periodic surveys to continuous interviewing. For Cycle 6 onward, the surveys were conducted in person by female interviewers who are hired and managed by the University of Michigan Institute for Social Research. The survey samples are intended to be nationally representative but not necessarily representative at subnational levels (such as individual states, ethnicities, or religions).

NSFG resumed data collection in January 2022 with a multi-mode, continuous survey design. Under this survey design, data collection will continue through December 2029.

== Data ==
For the survey cycles that have been completed, data is available both in the form of portable document format summaries and as full data files. In addition, program statements are available in SAS, SPSS, and STATA.

Key statistics are also browsable online.

NSFG data is also mirrored on the website of the University of Michigan's Inter-university Consortium for Political and Social Research.

== Reception and impact ==
=== Claims ===
Data collected by the NSFG are used as follows:

- By scholars in the behavioral sciences (e.g., sociology, demography, and economics) to study marriage, divorce, fertility, and family life
- By scholars in public health to study reproductive, maternal and infant health topics
- By agencies of the US Department of Health and Human Services, to brief senior officials and to inform program decision-making in research programs and in health and social service programs
- By state and local governments to plan health and social service programs
- By private-sector research organizations which distribute the information to the public and to policy makers
- By the press, to prepare articles on a number of topics related to health and family life

=== Academic research ===
The NSFG has been cited in more than 1,300 journal articles, NHCS reports, and book chapters. Research citing the NSFG is concentrated on topics related to family planning, contraception, abortion, and fertility.

== See also ==
- Demographic and Health Surveys
- List of household surveys in the United States
