= American Housing Survey =

The American Housing Survey (AHS) is a statistical survey funded by the United States Department of Housing and Urban Development (HUD) and conducted by the U.S. Census Bureau. It is the largest regular national housing sample survey in the United States and contains information on the number and characteristics of U.S. housing units as well as the households that occupy those units.

Beginning in 2007 both the national (AHS-N) and metropolitan (AHS-MS) surveys are conducted every odd-numbered year rather than the previous practice of sampling every odd-numbered year for AHS-N and even-numbered year for AHS-MS. The 2007 sample consisted of 55,000 national housing units and 7 metropolitan statistical areas (MSAs) with 3,000 units for a total sample size of 76,000 housing units. In 2001, there were 119,117,000 housing units in the United States, with 106,261,000 occupied and 12,855,000 vacant.

The metropolitan areas are revisited for an updated sample every six years. Since 1985, the survey data in both the national and metropolitan area samples are collected from the same homes each survey year; hence the AHS can track changes in these housing units over time. With each new national or metropolitan survey, new housing units are added to the sample to account for new construction since the last survey.

== Overview ==
The AHS contains a wide variety of information that can be used by professionals in many fields for planning, decision making, market research, or various kinds of program development. It provides data on apartments, single-family homes, mobile homes, vacant homes, family composition, income, housing and neighborhood quality, housing costs, equipment, fuels, size of housing unit, and recent movers.

The AHS survey has two distinguishing features. Unlike most surveys, the primary focus is on the housing unit; the survey does gather extensive information on the people living in the housing units, but only to relate the people characteristics to the housing characteristics. The AHS uses a longitudinal sample, which means that the Census Bureau goes back to the same housing unit with each new survey. This longitudinal feature allows HUD and the Census Bureau to see how housing units and people served in those units change over time.

== Products ==
HUD and the U.S. Census Bureau publish lengthy reports from each national and metropolitan survey. Those reports are available in hard copy from HUD USER or the Census Bureau in PDF format from both the HUD USER and Census Bureau web sites.

Analysts can also create their own tables from the more recent AHS national surveys, using the Census Bureau's MDAT technology available on the Census Bureau Web site.

In addition, both HUD and the Census Bureau offer public use files containing the responses from individual housing units, after removing any information that might identify respondents.

HUD also funds research using the AHS on topics such as housing inventory change or housing consumption by the elderly.

== Topics ==
Each AHS includes a variety of data on topics such as the following:

- Introductory Characteristics (such as owner tenure, race and origin of household, year built)
- Height and Condition of Building (such as the number of stories, foundation type, external building conditions)
- Size of Unit and Lot (such as number of rooms, bedrooms, square feet per person, lot size)
- Selected Equipment and Plumbing (such as the types of heating and cooling systems, type of plumbing, water source)
- Fuels (such as fuel type by usage: heating, cooking, water heating, clothes dryer)
- Failures in Equipment (such as toilet breakdowns, heating and electrical problems)
- Additional Indicators of Housing Quality (such as the presence of porches, owner/managers on property, evidence of rodents)
- Neighborhood (such as opinions of neighborhood, presence of such things as crime, odors, schools, noise, community security, parking lots)
- Household Composition (such as age, gender, marital status of householders, education levels, move-in dates)
- Previous Unit of Recent Movers (such as type of unit came from, number of people in previous residence)
- Reasons for Move and Choice of Current Residence (such as why left previous unit, why chose the current unit)
- Income Characteristics (such as total household income, whether financial assistance is part of income)
- Selected Housing Costs (such as monthly utility costs for electricity, piped gas, fuel oil, whether rent is paid, monthly costs of taxes, condo/cooperative fees)
- Journey to Work (such as type of transportation, travel time, distance to work, whether worked at home)
- Value, Purchase Price, and Source of Down Payment (such as year unit purchased, purchase price, source of down payment)
- Mortgage Characteristics (such as type of mortgage(s), payment plan for mortgage(s), interest rate, outstanding principal)

== History ==
The U.S. Department of Housing and Urban Development (HUD) conceived of the idea of a database that would assess the quality of the housing stock, analyze its characteristics, record what Americans were paying for housing and related services, and monitor how housing units changed over time. The U.S. Census Bureau worked with HUD to convert this idea into a full-fledged survey—complete with sampling frame, questionnaires, and survey procedures. With HUD funding, the Census Bureau launched the first Annual Housing Survey in 1973.

The 1973 survey was a national survey with metropolitan surveys beginning in 1974. The metropolitan surveys included 60 metropolitan area, with 20 surveys per year every three years. Now, the AHS metropolitan survey included 21 areas that are surveyed at six-year intervals, with seven metropolitan areas each survey year. Each survey included between 3,000 and 5,000 sample housing units.

Between 1973 and 1981, the Census Bureau conducted the national surveys annually. The national surveys have samples that range from 5,000 to 60,000-plus housing units. From 1983 to the present time, the Census Bureau conducted the AHS national survey every two years. And in 1985, the Annual Housing Survey was renamed the American Housing Survey.

The AHS has used three different national samples. The 1973 and 1974 reports use a sample drawn in 1973 using the 1970 census as a sampling frame; the 1975 through 1983 reports use a sample drawn in 1975 using the 1970 census as a sampling frame; and the 1985 through 2005 reports use a sample drawn in 1985 using the 1980 census as a sampling frame. With each new survey, the Census Bureau updates the sample it uses for additions to the stock from new construction or other sources.

Just as the AHS and its sample have evolved over time the AHS report formats have also changes over time. The 1973 through 1983 reports use a common format; the 1985 through 2005 reports use another common format. These changes, as well as other factors, affect the continuity of the data. In some cases, information is not available on a particular subject for all the national surveys.

Questions in the AHS are frequently updated to reflect the changes in society, demographics, and economic patterns. For example, the 2001 National AHS was updated to include new variables and information regarding mortgages, lines of credit, citizenship, nationality, and country of birth. In 2003, the definition of race was changed to allow for mixed race categories. And in 2005, the questions regarding household and householder income were redefined.

Recently HUD published a paper called 32 Years of Housing Data that summarizes data from all the national surveys.

== See also ==
- List of household surveys in the United States
