= Leon Truesdell =

American demographer (1880–1979)

Leon Edgar Truesdell (March 15, 1880 – January 12, 1979) was an American demographer. After graduating from Brown University, Truesdell became a high school principal. He began working for the United States federal government in 1911, within the Bureau of Fisheries. He also worked for the Census Bureau and the Department of Agriculture. Truesdell was a fellow of the American Statistical Association, the American Association for the Advancement of Science, and president of the Population Association of America.

== Early life and education ==
Leon Truesdell was a native of Rowe, Massachusetts, born on March 15, 1880, to parents Clarence and Lina V. Truesdell. He graduated from Leland and Gray Seminary in Townshend, Vermont, in 1903, and completed his bachelor's and master's of arts at Brown University in 1907. Truesdell obtained his PhD at the Robert Brookings Graduate School in 1928.

== Career ==
After graduating from Brown University, Truesdell served as a high school principal in New Hampshire and Massachusetts, while working with Brown faculty member Walter Goodnow Everett as a research assistant. Truesdell was hired by the Bureau of Fisheries in 1911, and quickly joined the Bureau of the Census, where he remained until 1914. Truesdell returned to the Census Bureau in 1919, following five years as a field assistant with the Department of Agriculture. He was the assistant chief of the agriculture division until his appointment as chief of the population division in 1925, a position he retained until 1948. Truesdell became chief demographer thereafter, and retired in 1955, but served as a consultant to the Census Bureau until 1967.

He was elected a fellow of the American Statistical Association in 1937. The American Association for the Advancement of Science awarded him an equivalent honor in 1958. Truesdell served as president of the Population Association of America from 1939 to 1940.

== Personal life ==
Truesdell was married to Constance Ethel Cole from 1916 to her death in 1957. The couple raised two daughters, Constance Emma and Miriam Helen. Truesdell died on January 12, 1979, at the Wisconsin Avenue Nursing Home in Washington, D.C.

A collection of Truesdell's papers is held in special collection by the Brown University Library.

== Selected publications ==
- Emanuel Goldenweiser; Leon Truesdell (1924). Farm Tenancy in the United States: An Analysis of the Results of the 1920 Census Relative to Farms Classified by Tenure Supplemented by Pertinent Data from Other Sources. U.S. Government Printing Office.
- Truesdell, Leon E. (1943). The Canadian Born in the United States. Yale University Press.
- Truesdell, Leon (1965). The Development of Punch Card Tabulation in the Bureau of the Census, 1890-1940. Bureau of the Census.
