= Central Virginia Waste Management Authority =

The Central Virginia Waste Management Authority (CVWMA) is a public service authority that implements solid waste management and recycling programs for thirteen local governments in Virginia. CVWMA's programs include curbside recycling, drop-off recycling centers, electronic waste recycling, and household hazardous waste collection.

== History ==
In 1989, the Virginia General Assembly mandated the development of solid waste management plans to achieve a minimum twenty-five (25) percent recycling rate by 1995. Thirteen local governments created the CVWMA in December 1990 to work cooperatively as a region in satisfying Virginia's recycling requirement.

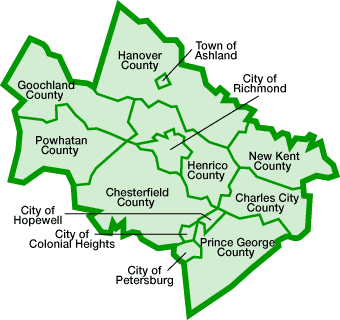
CVWMA Member Communities

== Members ==
Members of the CVWMA include:

- Ashland
- Charles City County
- Chesterfield County
- Colonial Heights
- Goochland County
- Hanover County
- Henrico County
- Hopewell
- New Kent County
- Petersburg
- Powhatan County
- Prince George County
- Richmond

Each member community appoints one or more representatives (by population) to the CVWMA Board of Directors, which governs the actions of the Authority. The Authority may contract for and maintain any garbage and refuse collection, transfer and disposal program or system within the cities, counties or town that are members of the CVWMA. This can include waste reduction, waste material recovery, recycling as mandated by law or otherwise, landfill operation, household hazardous waste management and disposal, and similar programs or systems.
