= United States Census of Governments =

The Census of Governments is a census performed by the United States Census Bureau. It is mandated by 13 U.S.C. § 161. The Census of Governments occurs twice-per-decade, in years ending with 2 and 7. The survey identifies the scope of American government at the federal, state, and municipal levels by measuring public finance, public employment, classifies municipal government structures and activities, and identifies municipal authorities and Special-purpose districts. The Census of Governments in its current form started in year 1957.

Revenue and expenditures reported for state & local governments in dollars and as a percent of gross domestic product for 2017 are as follows:

	US total (trillions of USD)			percent of GDP		
Description	State & local	State	Local	State & local	State	Local
Revenue	3.92	2.53	1.94	20.1%	13.0%	10.0%
Expenditure	3.66	2.32	1.91	18.8%	11.9%	9.8%

By comparison US GDP in 2017 was $19.5 trillion. Note that "State & local" is less than the sum of "State" and "Local" because of funds transfers. Data for each state and District of Columbia are available from 2017 State & Local Government Finance Tables, United States Census of Governments, 2019, Wikidata Q106141252.
