= National Longitudinal Surveys =

Set of surveys by the Bureau of Labor Statistics of the United States Department of Labor

The National Longitudinal Surveys (NLS) are a set of surveys sponsored by the Bureau of Labor Statistics (BLS) of the U.S. Department of Labor. These surveys have gathered information at multiple points in time on the labor market experiences and other significant life events of several groups of men and women. Each of the NLS samples consists of several thousand individuals, many of whom have been surveyed over several decades.

== Surveys ==
The National Longitudinal Survey of Youth 1997 (NLSY97) began in 1997 with 8,984 men and women born in 1980-84 (ages 12–17 in 1997). Sample members were interviewed annually from 1997 to 2011 and biennially thereafter. The 2015 interview was conducted with 7,103 men and women ages 30–36. Data are available from Round 1 (1997–98) to Round 17 (2015–16).

The National Longitudinal Survey of Youth 1979 (NLSY79) began in 1979 with 12,686 men and women born in 1957-64 (ages 14–22 in 1979). Sample members were interviewed annually from 1979–1994 and biennially thereafter. Oversamples of military and economically disadvantaged, nonblack/non-Hispanic respondents were dropped in 1985 and 1991, leaving a sample size of 9,964. The 2014 interview (Round 26) was conducted with 7,071 men and women ages 49–58.

The NLSY79 Children and Young Adults (NLSCYA) began in 1986 with children born to female NLSY79 respondents. Biennial data collection consists of interviews with the mothers and interviews with the children themselves; from 1994 onward, children turning age 15 and older during the survey year have been administered a Young Adult questionnaire that is similar to the NLSY79 questionnaire. In 2014, 276 children (ages 0–14) and 5,735 young adults (ages 15–42) were interviewed. To date, about 10,500 children have been interviewed in at least one survey round.

The National Longitudinal Surveys of Young Women and Mature Women (NLSW) comprised two separate surveys. The Young Women's survey began in 1968 with 5,159 women born in 1943-53 (ages 14–24 in 1968). Sample members were interviewed 22 times from 1968 to 2003. The final interview in 2003 was conducted with 2,857 women ages 49–59. The Mature Women's survey began in 1967 with 5,083 women born in 1922-37 (ages 30–44 in 1967). Sample members were interviewed 21 times from 1967 to 2003. The final interview in 2003 was conducted with 2,237 women ages 66–80.

The National Longitudinal Surveys of Young Men and Older Men (NLSM) comprised two separate surveys. The Young Men's survey began in 1966 with 5,225 men born in 1941-51 (ages 14–24 in 1966). Sample members were interviewed 12 times from 1966 to 1981. The Older Men's survey began in 1966 with 5,020 men born in 1906-21 (ages 45–59 in 1966). Sample members were interviewed 12 times from 1966 to 1983. A final interview in 1990 was conducted with 2,092 respondents who were 69–83 years old, and 2,206 family members of deceased respondents.

== NLSY97 ==
The National Longitudinal Survey of Youth 1997 (NLSY97), the newest survey in the NLS program, is a sample of 8,984 young men and women born during the years 1980 through 1984 and living in the United States when first interviewed. Survey respondents were ages 12 to 17 when first interviewed in 1997. The U.S. Department of Labor selected the NLSY97 cohort to enable research on youths' transition from school to the labor market and into adulthood. Data from the first 17 rounds of data collection are available to researchers. Round 17 consisted of 7,103 respondents, age 30- 36, and was completed in 2015-2016 with data made available in fall of 2017. In addition, survey staff conducted special high school and college transcript data collections to supplement the data on schooling provided by respondents. Many NLSY97 respondents also participated in a special administration of the computer-adaptive form of the Armed Services Vocational Aptitude Battery, and scores from that test are available for approximately 80 percent of sample members.

== NLSY79 ==
The National Longitudinal Survey of Youth 1979 (NLSY79) is a sample of 12,686 men and women born during the years 1957 through 1964 and living in the United States when the survey began. Survey respondents were ages 14 to 22 when first interviewed in 1979. The U.S. Department of Labor selected the NLSY79 cohort to replicate the NLS of Young Women and the NLS of Young Men, which began in the 1960s. The NLSY79 also was designed to help researchers and policymakers evaluate the expanded employment and training programs for youths legislated by the 1977 amendments to the Comprehensive Employment and Training Act (CETA). Data are available for this cohort through 2014 when the 7,071 men and women in the sample were ages 49 to 58. Data from the 2016-2017 survey will be released in late 2018/early 2019. To supplement the main data collection, survey staff conducted special high school and transcript surveys. NLSY79 respondents also participated in a special administration of the Armed Services Vocational Aptitude Battery.

== NLSCYA ==
The NLSY79 Children and Young Adults (NLSCYA) Funded by Bureau of Labor Statistics (BLS) and the Eunice Kennedy Shriver National Institute of Child Health and Human Development (NICHD), the NLSY79 Child and Young Adult surveys contain comprehensive information on the experiences of children born to female NLSY79 respondents. The collection of data on these NLSY79 children began in 1986, and a battery of cognitive, socioemotional, and physiological assessments has been administered biennially since that year. Their mothers also provide reports on their children's health, temperament, motor and social development, behavior problems, school activities, and home environments. Beginning in 1988, children age 10 and older have answered a self-administered set of questions about family, friends, jobs, school, after-school activities, computer use, religious attendance, smoking, alcohol and drug use, and more. Starting in 1994, children who have reached age 15 by December 31 of the survey year complete a questionnaire that is similar to the main NLSY79 survey and asks about work experiences, training, schooling, health, fertility, parenting and attitudes. The Young Adult questionnaire, conducted primarily by telephone, replaced the child assessments for young adults 15 years or older. Young adults also report on sensitive topics such as parent child conflict, participation in delinquent or criminal activities, use of controlled and uncontrolled substances, sexual activity, volunteer activities, and expectations for the future. The data collected about the children can be linked with information collected from their mothers in the main NLSY79 survey. The NLSY79 Child and Young Adult surveys are a valuable resource for studying how individual and family characteristics and experiences affect the well-being and development of children, adolescents, and young adults.

== Original cohorts ==
The NLSW and NLSM make up the original four cohorts, which were designed to represent the U.S. civilian noninstitutional population at the time of the initial survey. The surveys were funded by the Office of Manpower, Automation, and Training (now, the Employment and Training Administration) of the Department of Labor, and conducted by the Center for Human Resource Research (CHRR) of Ohio State University.

=== The National Longitudinal Surveys of Young Women and Mature Women (NLSW) ===
The NLS of Young Women was a sample of 5,159 women who were ages 14 to 24 in 1968. The survey was one of four original groups first interviewed when the NLS program began in the mid-1960s. The U.S. Department of Labor selected the Young Women cohort to enable research on the employment patterns of women who were finishing school, making initial career decisions, and starting families. Data are available for this cohort from 1968 through 2003, when the survey was discontinued. The survey covered a variety of topics, including: characteristics of jobs, labor market status, education, health and physical condition, marital and family characteristics, income and assets, attitudes and perspectives, retirement, environmental characteristics, transfers of time and money. A special survey of the high schools of young women respondents provided additional information about their educational experiences. The survey also has included questions on topics specific to the life stage of respondents, such as educational experiences and plans in the earlier years of the survey, childcare issues and fertility expectations a few years later, and health, pension, and retirement information and, finally, asked about transfers of time and money between respondents, their parents, and their children.

The NLS of Mature Women was a sample of 5,083 women who were ages 30 to 44 in 1967. The survey was one of four original groups first interviewed when the NLS program began in the mid-1960s. The U.S. Department of Labor selected the Mature Women cohort to enable research on the employment patterns of women who were reentering the workforce and balancing the roles of homemaker, mother, and labor force participant. Data are available for this cohort from 1967 through 2003, when the survey was discontinued. The survey covered a variety of topics, including:characteristics of jobs, labor market status, education, health and physical condition, marital and family characteristics, income and assets, attitudes and perspectives, retirement, environmental characteristics, transfers of time and money. The survey also included questions on topics specific to the life stage of respondents, such as childcare issues in the earlier years of the survey and health, pension, and retirement information and, finally, asked about transfers of time and money between respondents, their parents, and their children.

=== The National Longitudinal Surveys of Young Men and Older Men (NLSM) ===
The NLS of Young Men was a sample of 5,225 men who were ages 14 to 24 in 1966. The survey was one of four original groups first interviewed when the NLS program began in the mid-1960s. The U.S. Department of Labor selected the Young Men cohort to enable research on the employment patterns of men who were completing school and entering the work force or joining the military and were thus making initial career and job decisions that would impact their employment in the coming decades. Data are available for this cohort from 1966 through 1981, when the survey was discontinued. A special survey of the high schools of young men respondents provided additional information about their educational experiences. The survey covered a variety of topics, including: characteristics of jobs, labor market status, education, health and physical condition, marital and family characteristics, income and assets, attitudes and perspectives, environmental characteristics, military service, and training.

The NLS of Older Men was a sample of 5,020 men who were ages 45 to 59 in 1966. The survey was one of four original groups first interviewed when the NLS program began in the mid-1960s. The U.S. Department of Labor selected the Older Men cohort to enable research on the employment patterns of men who were nearing the completions of their careers, making decisions about the timing and extent of their labor force withdrawal, and planning for retirement. Data are available for this cohort from 1966 through 1983. Additional information was collected in 1990 during final interviews with the remaining respondents and the widows or other family members of deceased sample members. The survey covered a variety of topics, including: characteristics of jobs, labor market status, education, health and physical condition, marital and family characteristics, income and assets, attitudes and perspectives, retirement, environmental characteristics, military service.

== Survey topics ==
Demographic and family background, education, military experiences, job characteristics and training, labor market status and histories, marital and family characteristics, income and assets, transfers of time and money, retirement, geographic location and mobility, health, nutrition, and physical activity, fertility and parenting, sexual activity, attitudes and expectations, behaviors and perspectives, environmental characteristics, and civic engagement. Additionally, NLSY79 Child and Young Adult surveys include: Assessments of the quality of the home environment, cognitive development, temperament, and motor, social and emotional development.

== Accessing the surveys ==
NLS public-use data for each cohort are available at no cost via the Investigator, an online search and extraction site that enables individuals to review NLS variables and create their own data sets. Application is necessary to access NLS geocode and school surveys data. The geocode application document is available on the BLS website.

== See also ==
- List of household surveys in the United States

== Additional resources ==
- Meet Herbet S. Parnes, The First Director of the NLS Program at Ohio State
- Donna S. Rothstein, "Leaving a job during the Great Recession: evidence from the National Longitudinal Survey of Youth 1979," Monthly Labor Review, U.S. Bureau of Labor Statistics, December 2018.
- Pierret, Charles R. "The National Longitudinal Survey of Youth: 1979 Cohort at 25." Monthly Labor Review 128,2 (February 2005): 3-7. https://www.bls.gov/opub/mlr/2005/02/art1full.pdf
