= Warren M. Persons =

American economist (1878–1937)

Warren Milton Persons
- Born: 1878
- Died: October 11, 1937 (aged 58–59)
- Education: University of Wisconsin
- Occupation: Economist
- Spouse: Irmagarde Keller

Warren M. Persons (1878–1937) was an American economist. He was an assistant professor of economics at Dartmouth College, and a professor of economics at Colorado College and Harvard University. He was the President of the American Statistical Association in 1923.

== Early life ==
Warren M. Persons was born in 1878. He graduated from the University of Wisconsin in 1899, and he earned a PhD in economics in 1916.

== Career ==
Persons taught economics at the University of Wisconsin from 1901 to 1906. He was an assistant professor of economics at Dartmouth College from 1906 to 1910. He was a professor of economics at Colorado College from 1913 to 1918, and at Harvard University from 1918 to 1928. He was also the editor of The Review of Economics and Statistics.

Persons became a fellow of the American Statistical Association in 1914, and its president in 1923.

== Personal life and death ==
Persons married Irmagarde Keller in 1906. He fell ill with tuberculosis in 1910 and survived in 1913.

Persons died on October 11, 1937.

== Works ==
- Persons, Warren M. (1919). Indices of General Business Conditions. Cambridge, Massachusetts: Harvard University Committee on Economic research. OCLC 917724375.
- Persons, Warren M. (1928). The Construction of Index Numbers. New York: Houghton Mifflin Company.
