= Virginia Housing =

Agency overview
- Formed: 1972
- Jurisdiction: Virginia
- Headquarters: Richmond, Virginia, United States
- Employees: 300+
- Agency executive: Tammy Neale, Chief Executive Officer
- Website: Virginia Housing

Virginia Housing, formerly the Virginia Housing Development Authority (VHDA), is a self-supporting organization created by the Commonwealth of Virginia in 1972, to help Virginians attain quality affordable housing. Mortgages are funded by bonds issued by Virginia Housing, not by taxpayer dollars, and are available for homebuyers and developers of quality rental housing. The group teaches free homeownership classes, and helps people with disabilities and the elderly make their homes more livable. Virginia Housing works with lenders, developers, local governments, and community service organizations.

== Funding sources ==
Each year, Virginia Housing raises funds through the capital markets to support lending for single family and multifamily loan programs. Investors purchase Virginia Housing securities and loans, and this, in turn, generates their principal source of capital. These securities do not constitute a debt or obligation of the Commonwealth.

== Organizational structure ==
Virginia Housing is a quasi-government agency. The governor appoints an 11-member Board of Commissioners. However, the authority is self-supporting and does not use tax dollars to fund its lending programs. Tammy Neale, its Chief Executive Officer since 2024, heads a leadership team of twelve divisional managers. Virginia Housing has more than 300 full-time associates.
