= United States Census Bureau =

U.S. agency responsible for the census related statistics

- Seal

- Wordmark

Agency overview
- Formed: July 1, 1902; 124 years ago
- Headquarters: Suitland, Maryland, U.S.
- Agency executives: George Cook, Acting Director; Ron S. Jarmin, Deputy Director and Chief Operating Officer
- Parent agency: U.S. Department of Commerce
- Website: census.gov

The United States Census Bureau, officially the Bureau of the Census, is a federal statistical agency responsible for producing data about the American people and economy, under the United States Department of Commerce. The bureau's director is appointed by the president of the United States.

The Census Bureau's primary mission is conducting the United States census every ten years, which allocates the seats of the United States House of Representatives to the states based on their population. The bureau's various censuses and surveys help allocate over $675 billion in federal funds every year and it assists states, local communities, and businesses in making informed decisions. The information provided by the census informs decisions on where to build and maintain schools, hospitals, transportation infrastructure, and police and fire departments.

In addition to the decennial census, the Census Bureau continually conducts over 130 surveys and programs a year, including the American Community Survey, the United States Economic Census, and the Current Population Survey. The United States Economic Census occurs every five years and reports on American business and the American economy in order to plan business decisions. Furthermore, economic and foreign trade indicators released by the federal government typically contain data produced by the Census Bureau.

As of September 19, 2025, George Cook is the acting director of the Census Bureau.

== Legal mandate ==
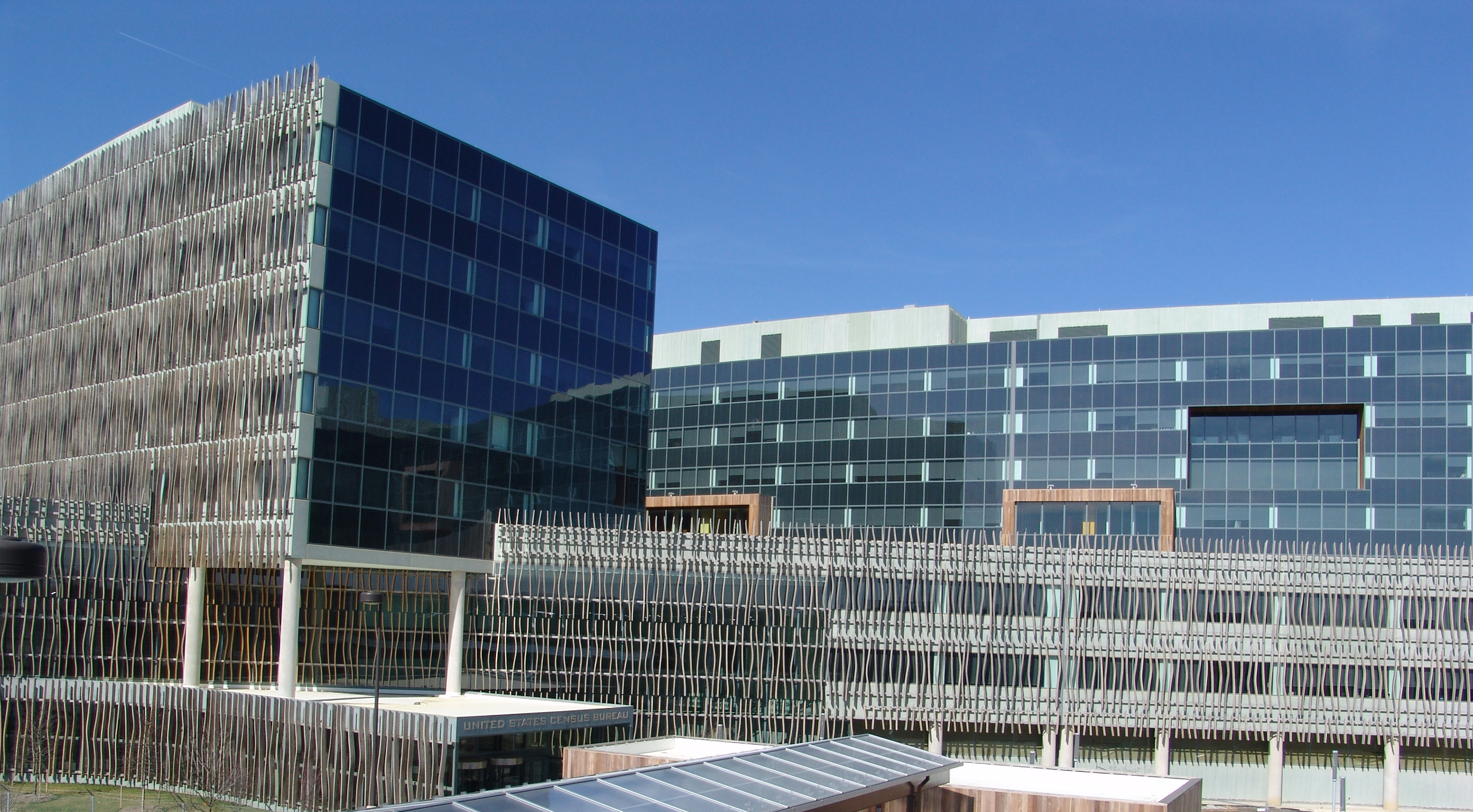
Census headquarters in Suitland, Maryland

Article One of the United States Constitution (section II) directs the population be enumerated at least once every ten years and the resulting counts used to set the number of members from each state in the House of Representatives and, by extension, in the Electoral College. The Census Bureau now conducts a full population count every ten years in years ending with a zero and uses the term "decennial" to describe the operation. Between censuses, the Census Bureau makes population estimates and projections.

In addition, census data directly affects how more than $400 billion per year in federal and state funding is allocated to communities for neighborhood improvements, public health, education, transportation and more. The Census Bureau is mandated with fulfilling these obligations: the collecting of statistics about the nation, its people, and economy. The Census Bureau's legal authority is codified in Title 13 of the United States Code.

The Census Bureau also conducts surveys on behalf of various federal government and local government agencies on topics such as employment, crime, health, consumer expenditures, and housing. Within the bureau, these are known as "demographic surveys" and are conducted perpetually between and during decennial (10-year) population counts. The Census Bureau also conducts economic surveys of manufacturing, retail, service, and other establishments and of domestic governments.

From 1790 through 1840, the census was taken by marshals of the judicial districts. The Census Act of 1840 established a central office which became known as the Census Office. Several acts followed that revised and authorized new censuses, typically at the 10-year intervals. In 1902, the temporary Census Office was moved under the Department of Interior, and in 1903 it was renamed the Census Bureau under the new Department of Commerce and Labor. The department was intended to consolidate overlapping statistical agencies, but Census Bureau officials were hindered by their subordinate role in the department. In 1913, the Census Bureau stayed in the Department of Commerce after its split from the Department of Labor.

An act in 1920 changed the date and authorized manufacturing censuses every two years and agriculture censuses every 10 years. In 1929, a bill was passed mandating the House of Representatives be reapportioned based on the results of the 1930 census. In 1954, various acts were codified into Title 13 of the U.S. Code.

By law, the Census Bureau must count everyone and submit state population totals to the U.S. president by December 31 of any year ending in a zero. States within the Union receive the results in the spring of the following year.

== Data collection ==
U.S. Census Bureau Regions and Divisions

=== Census regions and divisions ===
The United States Census Bureau defines four statistical regions, with nine divisions. The Census Bureau regions are widely used for data collection and analysis. The Census Bureau definition is pervasive. The territories are not included, but the District of Columbia is.

Regional divisions used by the United States Census Bureau:

U.S. Census Bureau regional divisions
| Region | Division | States |
|---|---|---|
| Northeast | New England | Connecticut; Maine; Massachusetts; New Hampshire; Rhode Island; Vermont |
| Northeast | Mid-Atlantic | New Jersey; New York; Pennsylvania |
| Midwest | East North Central | Illinois; Indiana; Michigan; Ohio; Wisconsin |
| Midwest | West North Central | Iowa; Kansas; Minnesota; Missouri; Nebraska; North Dakota; South Dakota |
| South | South Atlantic | Delaware; District of Columbia; Florida; Georgia; Maryland; North Carolina; South Carolina; Virginia; West Virginia |
| South | East South Central | Alabama; Kentucky; Mississippi; Tennessee |
| South | West South Central | Arkansas; Louisiana; Oklahoma; Texas |
| West | Mountain | Arizona; Colorado; Idaho; Montana; Nevada; New Mexico; Utah; Wyoming |
| West | Pacific | Alaska; California; Hawaii; Oregon; Washington |

==== History ====
The first census was collected in 1790 and published in 1791. It was 56 pages and cost $44,377.28.

The current system was introduced for the 1910 census, but other ways of grouping states were used historically by the Census Bureau. The first of these was introduced after the 1850 census by statistician and later census superintendent J. D. B. De Bow. He published a compendium where the states and territories were grouped into five "great divisions", namely the Middle, New England, the Northwestern, the Southern, and the Southwestern great divisions. Unsatisfied with this system, De Bow devised another one four years later, with states and territories grouped into an Eastern, Interior, and Western "great section", each divided into a northern and southern half called "divisions".

In the following decades, several other systems were used, until the current one was introduced in 1910. This system has seen only minor changes: New Mexico and Arizona were both added to the Mountain division upon statehood in 1912, the North region was divided into a Northeast and a North Central region in 1940, Alaska and Hawaii were both added to the Pacific division upon statehood in 1959, and the North Central region was renamed the Midwest in 1984.

=== Uses of census data ===
Many federal, state, local and tribal governments use census data to:

- Decide the location of new housing and public facilities,
- Examine the demographic characteristics of communities, states, and the US,
- Plan transportation systems and roadways,
- Determine quotas and creation of police and fire precincts, and
- Create localized areas for elections, schools, utilities, etc.
- Gathers population information every 10 years

Census data is used to determine how seats of Congress are distributed to states. Census data is not used to determine or define race genetically, biologically or anthropologically. The census data is also used by the Bureau to obtain a real-time estimate in U.S. and World Population Clock. Only people who live in the 50 states and within the District of Columbia are included in the estimation.

=== Data stewardship ===
The United States Census Bureau is committed to confidentiality and guarantees non-disclosure of any addresses or personal information related to individuals or establishments. Title 13 of the U.S. Code establishes penalties for the disclosure of this information. All census employees must sign an affidavit of non-disclosure prior to employment. This non-disclosure states "I will not disclose any information contained in the schedules, lists, or statements obtained for or prepared by the Census Bureau to any person or persons either during or after employment." The punishment for breaking the non-disclosure is a fine up to $250,000 or five years in prison.

The bureau cannot share responses, addresses or personal information with anyone, including the United States or foreign governments, or law enforcement agencies such as the IRS, FBI, or Interpol. "[P]roviding quality data for public good while respecting individual privacy and protecting confidentiality – is the Census Bureau's core responsibility"; "Keeping the public's trust is critical to our ability to carry out our mission as the leading source of quality data about the nation's people and economy." Only after 72 years does the information collected become available to other agencies or the general public. Seventy-two years was picked because usually by 72 years since the census is taken, most participants would be deceased.

Despite these guarantees of confidentiality, the Census Bureau has some history of disclosures to other government agencies. In 1918, the Census Bureau released individual information regarding several hundred young men to the Justice Department and Selective Service system for the purpose of prosecutions for draft evasion. During World War II, the United States Census Bureau assisted the government's Japanese American internment efforts by providing confidential neighborhood information on Japanese-Americans. The bureau's role was denied for decades but was finally proven in 2007.

United States census data are valuable for the country's political parties; Democrats and Republicans are highly interested in knowing the accurate number of persons in their respective districts. These insights are often linked to financial and economic strategies that are central to federal, state and city investments for locations of particular populations. Such apportionments are designed to distribute political power across neutral spatial allocations; however, "because so much is at stake, the census also runs the risk of being politicized."

Such political tensions highlight the complexity of identity and classification; some argue that unclear results from the population data "is due to distortions brought about by political pressures." One frequently used example includes ambiguous ethnic counts, which often involves underenumeration and/or undercounting of minority populations. Ideas about race, ethnicity and identity have also evolved in the United States, and such changes warrant examination of how these shifts have impacted the accuracy of census data over time.

The United States Census Bureau began pursuing technological innovations to improve the precision of its census data collection in the 1980s. Robert W. Marx, the Chief of the Geography Division of the USCB, teamed up with the U.S. Geological Survey and oversaw the creation of the Topologically Integrated Geographic Encoding and Referencing (TIGER) database system. Census officials were able to evaluate the more sophisticated and detailed results that the TIGER system produced; furthermore, TIGER data is also available to the public. And while the TIGER system does not directly amass demographic data, as a geographic information system (GIS), it can be used to merge demographics to conduct more accurate geospatial and mapping analysis.

In July 2019, the Census Bureau stopped releasing new data via American FactFinder, which was decommissioned in March 2020 after 20 years of being the agency's primary tool for data dissemination. The new platform is data.census.gov.

=== Ongoing surveys ===
A social media video from the Census Bureau explaining how to use data.census.gov, an online platform that enables the public to search and use data from their Bureau's surveys.

Throughout the decade between censuses, the bureau conducts surveys to produce a general view and comprehensive study of the United States' social and economic conditions. Staff from the Current Surveys Program conduct over 130 ongoing and special surveys about people and their characteristics. A network of professional field representatives gathers information from a sample of households, responding to questions about employment, consumer expenditures, health, housing, and other topics.

Surveys conducted between decades:

- American Community Survey
- American Housing Survey
- Consumer Expenditure Survey
- Census of Governments
- Current Population Survey
- Economic Census
- National Ambulatory Medical Care Survey
- National Health Interview Survey
- National Hospital Care Survey
- National Hospital Ambulatory Medical Care Survey
- National Crime Victimization Survey
- National Nursing Home Survey
- Survey of Income and Program Participation
- Survey of Construction
- Survey of Market Absorption
- Survey of Program Dynamics
- National Longitudinal Survey
- National Survey of Fishing, Hunting, & Wildlife-Associated Recreation
- Residential Finance Survey
- National Epidemiologic Survey of Alcohol Related Conditions
- Annual Retail Trade Survey
- Annual Wholesale Trade Survey
- Annual and Quarterly Services Surveys

=== Other surveys conducted ===
The Census Bureau also collects information on behalf of survey sponsors. These sponsors include the Bureau of Justice Statistics (BJS), the Department of Housing and Urban Development (HUD), the National Center for Education Statistics (NCES), and the National Science Foundation (NSF), among others.

== Organizational structure ==
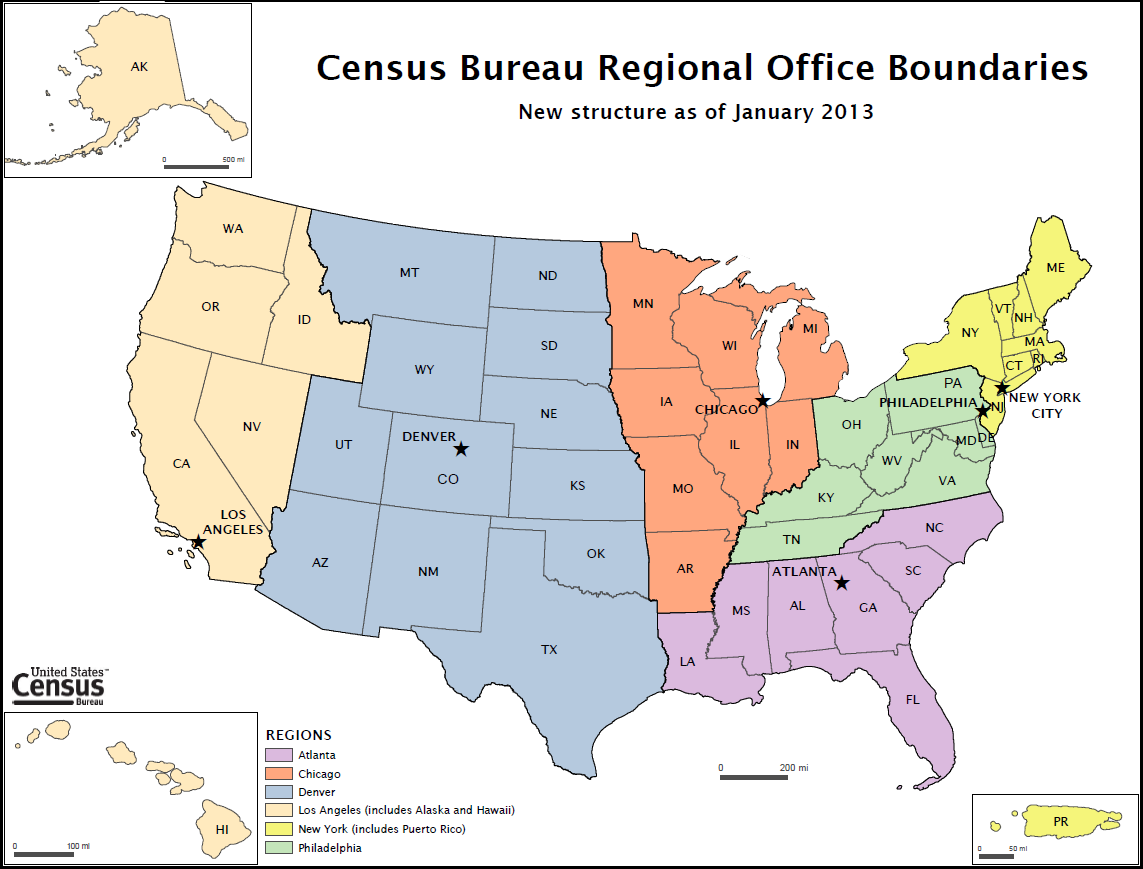
U.S. Census Bureau Regional Office boundaries

Since 1903, the official census-taking agency of the United States government has been the Bureau of the Census. The Census Bureau is headed by a director, assisted by a deputy director and an executive staff composed of the associate directors.

The Census Bureau headquarters has been in Suitland, Maryland, since 1942. A new headquarters complex completed there in 2007 supports over 4,000 employees. The bureau operates regional offices in six cities: New York City, Philadelphia, Chicago, Atlanta, Denver, and Los Angeles. The National Processing Center is in Jeffersonville, Indiana. Additional temporary processing facilities facilitate the decennial census, which employs more than a million people. The cost of the 2000 census was $4.5 billion. During the years just prior to the decennial census, parallel census offices, known as "Regional Census Centers" are opened in the field office cities. The decennial operations are carried out from these facilities. The Regional Census Centers oversee the openings and closings of smaller "Area Census Offices" within their collection jurisdictions. In 2020, Regional Census Centers oversaw the operation of 248 Area Census Offices, The estimated cost of the 2010 census is $14.7 billion.

On January 1, 2013, the Census Bureau consolidated its twelve regional offices into six. Increasing costs of data collection, changes in survey management tools such as laptops and the increasing use of multi-modal surveys (i.e. internet, telephone, and in-person) led the Bureau to consolidate. The six regional offices that closed were Boston, Charlotte, Dallas, Detroit, Kansas City and Seattle. The remaining regional offices are New York City, Philadelphia, Chicago, Atlanta, Denver, and Los Angeles.

The Census Bureau also runs the Census Information Center cooperative program that involves 58 "national, regional, and local non-profit organizations". The CIC program aims to represent the interests of underserved communities.

== Computer equipment ==
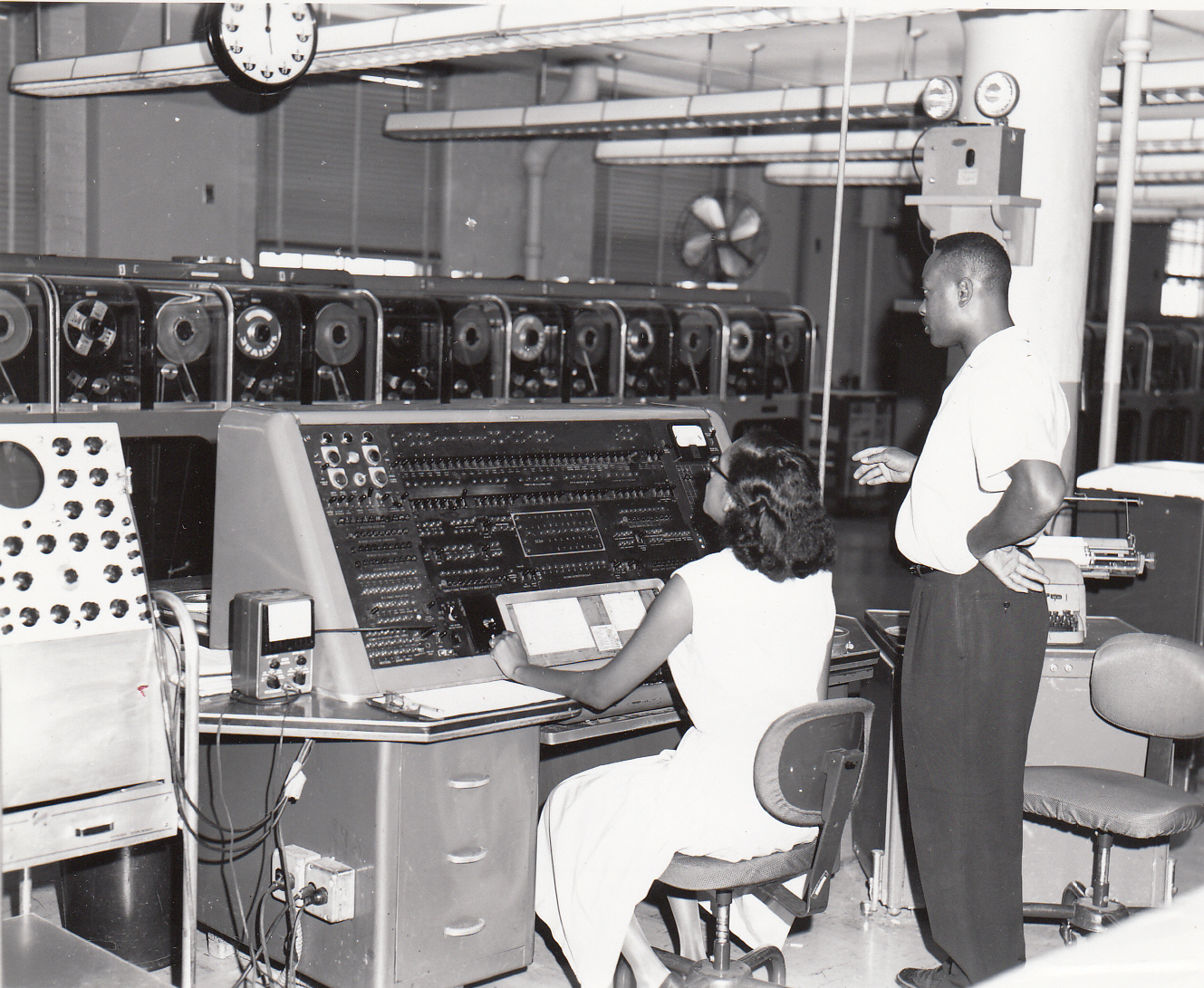
Census Bureau employees tabulate data using one of the agency's UNIVAC computers, c. 1960.

The 1890 census was the first to use the electric tabulating machines invented by Herman Hollerith. For 1890–1940 details, see Truesdell, Leon E. (1965). The Development of Punch Card Tabulation in the Bureau of the Census, 1890–1940: With outlines of actual tabulation programs. U.S. GPO. In 1946, knowing of the bureau's funding of Hollerith and, later, Powers, John Mauchly approached the bureau about early funding for UNIVAC development. A UNIVAC I computer was accepted by the bureau in 1951.

== Handheld computers ==
Historically, the census information was gathered by census takers going door-to-door collecting information in a ledger. Beginning in 1970 information was gathered via mailed forms. To reduce paper usage, reduce payroll expense and acquire the most comprehensive list of addresses ever compiled, 500,000 handheld computers (HHCs) (specifically designed, single-purpose devices) were used for the first time in 2009 during the address canvassing portion of the 2010 Decennial Census Project. Projected savings were estimated to be over $1 billion.

=== Security precautions ===
The HHC was manufactured by Harris Corporation, an established Department of Defense contractor, via a controversial contract with the Department of Commerce. Secured access via a fingerprint swipe guaranteed only the verified user could access the unit. A GPS capacity was integral to the daily address management and the transfer of gathered information. Of major importance was the security and integrity of the populace's private information.

=== Success and failure ===
Enumerators (information gatherers) that had operational problems with the device understandably made negative reports. During the 2009 Senate confirmation hearings for Robert Groves, President Obama's Census Director appointee, there was much mention of problems but very little criticism of the units. In rural areas, the sparsity of cell phone towers caused problems with data transmission to and from the HHC. Since the units were updated nightly with important changes and updates, operator implementation of proper procedure was imperative.

== Research studies ==
Census Bureau stays current by conducting research studies to improve the work that they do. Census researchers explore topics about survey innovations, participation, and data accuracy, such as undercount, overcount, the use of technologies, multilingual research, and ways to reduce costs. In addition, the Bureau pretests surveys and digital products before they are fielded and then evaluates them after they have been conducted.

== Notable figures ==
- John Shaw Billings
- Rattan Chand
- W. Edwards Deming
- Davis Rich Dewey
- Halbert L. Dunn
- Murray Feshbach
- Robert Groves
- Henry Gannett
- Morris H. Hansen
- Joseph Adna Hill
- Herman Hollerith
- Leslie Kish
- John Wesley Langley
- Bernard Malamud
- Thomas Commerford Martin
- Warren Mitofsky
- Edna Paisano
- Ivan Petrof
- Cyrus Guernsey Pringle
- Richard M. Scammon
- Howard Sutherland

== See also ==
- List of U.S. states and territories by population
- List of United States cities by population
- List of United States counties and county equivalents
- United States Office of Management and Budget
  - Primary statistical area (list)
  - Combined statistical area (list)
  - Core-based statistical area (list)
    - Metropolitan statistical area (list)
    - Micropolitan statistical area (list)
  - List of United States urban areas
- Title 13 of the United States Code
- Title 15 of the Code of Federal Regulations
- Director of the United States Census Bureau
- Data.gov
- USAFacts
- Statistical Abstract of the United States
