= Title 13 of the United States Code =

U.S. federal statutes on the census

Title 13 of the United States Code outlines the role of the United States Census in the United States Code.

== Chapters ==
- Chapter 1: Administration
- Chapter 3: Collection and Publication of Statistics
- Chapter 5: Censuses
- Chapter 7: Offenses and Penalties
- Chapter 9: Collection and Publication of Foreign Commerce and Trade Statistics
- Chapter 10: Exchange of Census Information
