= Helen Pearson (science journalist) =

British science journalist

- Born: Helen Catharine Pearson; 1973 (age 52–53)
- Occupation: Science journalist
- Notable work: 'The Life Project'

Helen Pearson is a British science journalist, author and editor for the journal Nature. She was named European Science Journalist of the Year 2025. Pearson's wide-ranging work at Nature includes five years running the newsroom as the journal's Chief Magazine Editor. She is an Honorary Professor at University College London, where she teaches science writing. Pearson's writing and reporting focus on making sense of research evidence in wide-ranging areas of science and society. She is the author of The Life Project, a book about the British birth cohort studies, a series of longitudinal studies which have tracked thousands of people since their birth.

== Education ==
Pearson obtained a Bachelor of Arts degree in Natural Sciences (Genetics) from the University of Cambridge in 1996. She was awarded her PhD in 1999 from the University of Edinburgh, for research completed at the Medical Research Council Human Genetics Unit. Her PhD thesis was on the role of the gene Pax6 in development of the cortex.

== Career ==
Pearson joined Nature in 2001 as a reporter. She has interviewed and written about many high-profile scientists and academics for Nature including Robert Langer, Lawrence Summers and Joe Thornton. She specialises in journalism that makes sense of complex bodies of scientific evidence and that examines how evidence is used. She has written about adolescent mental health, autism, alcohol risks, vaccine hesitancy, science advice systems and artificial intelligence. Pearson also writes about systematic reviews and other evidence syntheses, including use of AI tools to synthesize the scientific literature.

She has written freelance articles in outlets including The Guardian, Bloomberg, Issues in Science and Technology and The Independent.

Pearson is an Honorary Professor of Practice at University College London in the Department of Science and Technology Studies, where she teaches science writing and journalism.

Pearson's book, The Life Project: The extraordinary story of our ordinary lives was published by Allen Lane in 2016 and is about the British birth cohort studies. The oldest of these studies, the National Survey of Health and Development (NSHD), started in 1946, and the series includes the National Child Development Study, established in 1958, the 1970 British Cohort Study and the Millennium Cohort Study of babies born in 2000-2001. Pearson also included in her book the Avon Longitudinal Study of Parents and Children, also known as Children of the 90s.

Pearson’s second book, Beyond Belief: How Evidence Shows What Really Work will be published by Princeton University Press in 2026. It examines how different disciplines came to embrace evidence-based practice, in which decisions and practices are based on scientific evidence rather than conventional wisdom, opinions or beliefs.

== Appearances ==
Pearson has given public lectures and talks at academic venues and literary and science festivals including the Edinburgh International Book Festival, the RSA, London School of Economics and Dartington Way with Words Literary Festival. She gave the keynote public lecture at the British Society for the History of Science conference in 2017.

She has appeared on podcasts and national and international radio including Radio 4’s Start the Week, and has written about science writing and journalism as a career option for scientists.

In 2017, she gave a TED talk based on her book, The Life Project.

In 2025, she appeared in YouTube videos for Nature about autism and vaccine hesitancy.

== Awards ==
Pearson was awarded European Science Journalist of the Year 2025 by the European Federation for Science Journalism for feature articles about science advice, AI and the science of protests.

She won Editor of the Year 2022 at the Association of British Science Writers awards for her work as Nature’s Chief Magazine Editor, including during the COVID pandemic.

Pearson’s book, The Life Project was named best science book of the year by The Observer, was a book of the year for The Economist and was longlisted for the Orwell Prize, Highly Commended at the 2017 British Medical Association medical book awards and Highly Commended in the 2016 UK Medical Journalists’ Association Awards.

- 2013 Winner, Medical Journalists’ Association Award For feature article Coming of Age
- 2012 Winner Best Feature, Association of British Science Writers Award For feature article Study of a Lifetime
- 2010 Winner Best Feature, Association of British Science Writers Award For feature article One Gene, Twenty Years
- 2010 Winner, Wistar Science Journalism Award For feature article One Gene, Twenty Years

== Published works ==
=== Books ===
- The Life Project (2016)
- Beyond Belief (2026)

=== Articles ===
- Universities are embracing AI: will students get smarter or stop thinking?
- Autism is on the rise: what’s really behind the increase?
- How to make America healthy: the real problems — and best fixes
- How to speak to a vaccine sceptic: research reveals what works
- Do smartphones and social media really harm teens’ mental health?
- Alcohol and cancer risk: what you need to know
- The science of protests: how to shape public opinion and swing votes
- Can AI review the scientific literature — and figure out what it all means?
- Science could solve some of the world’s biggest problems. Why aren’t governments using it?
- How COVID broke the evidence pipeline
- What makes some people happy, healthy and successful – and others not?
- Britain’s birth cohort studies are the envy of the world
- The lab that knows where your time really goes
- Prehistoric proteins: Raising the Dead
- Study of a Lifetime
- One Gene, Twenty Years
- Protein engineering: The fate of fingers
- At-Home DNA Tests Are Here, But Doctors Aren't Celebrating
