= Demography =

Study of human populations and their structures

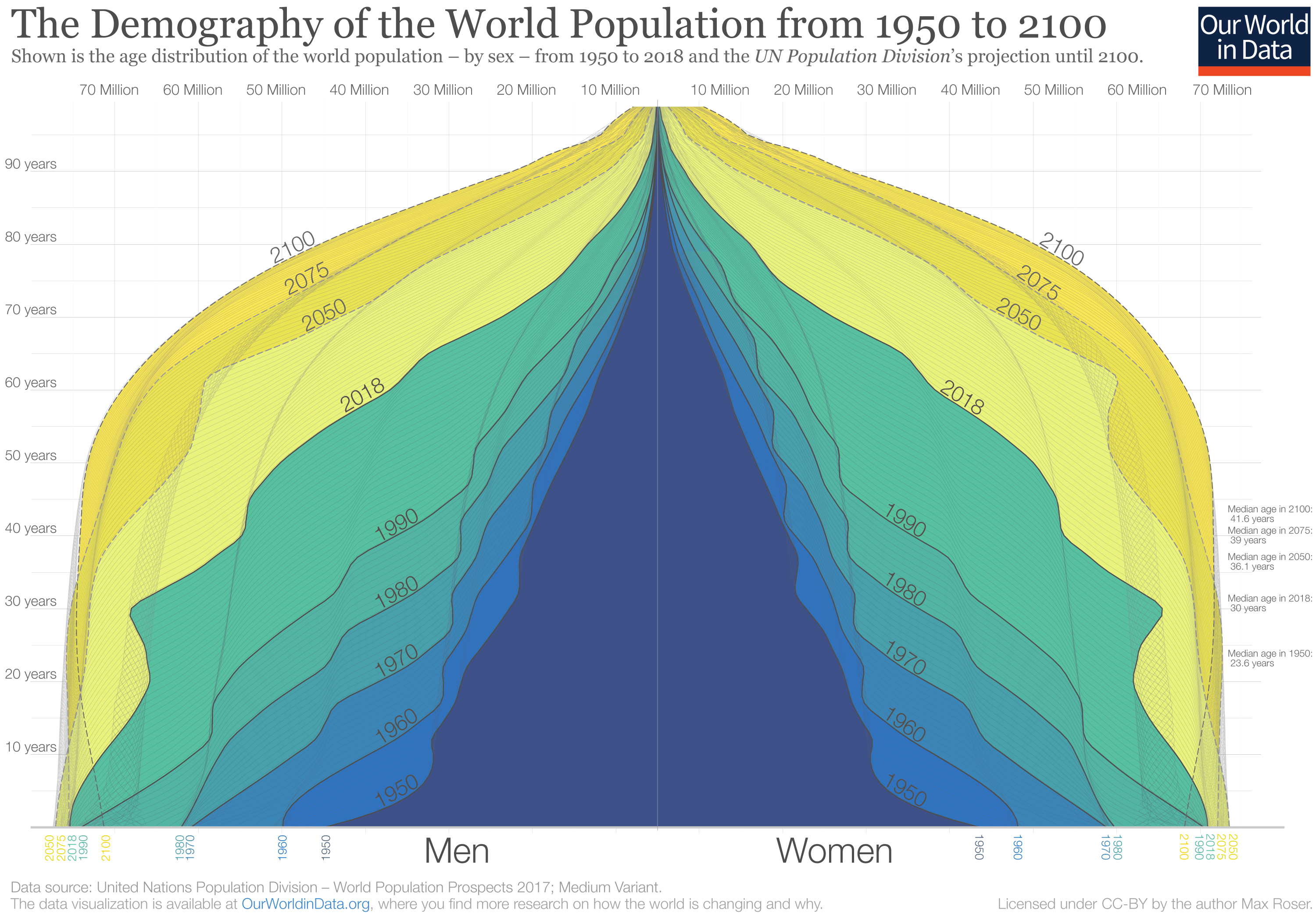
The Demography of the World Population from 1950 to 2100. Data source: United Nations — World Population Prospects 2017

Demography (from Ancient Greek δῆμος (dêmos) 'people, society' and -γραφία (-graphía) 'writing, drawing, description') is the statistical study of human populations: their size, composition (e.g., ethnic group, age), and how they change through the interplay of fertility (births), mortality (deaths), and migration.

Formal demography limits its object of study to the measurement of population processes, while the broader field of social demography (or population studies) also analyses the relationships among economic, social, institutional, cultural, and biological processes that influence a population. Educational institutions usually treat demography as a field of sociology, although independent demography departments do exist.

Demographic analysis (usually abbreviated to DA) examines and measures the dimensions and dynamics of populations, including whole societies or groups defined by criteria such as education, nationality, religion, and ethnicity. The methods of DA have primarily been developed to study human populations, but have also been used in a variety of areas where researchers want to know how other non-human populations of social actors can change across time through processes of birth, death, and migration.

Demographic analysis is used in a wide variety of contexts. In the labor force, DA is used to estimate sizes and flows of populations of workers; in population ecology the focus is on the birth, death, emigration and immigration of individuals in a population of living organisms; in the social sciences this could involve the movement of firms and institutional forms; in business planning DA is often used to describe the population in a business's geographic area.

In the context of human biological populations, demographic analysis uses administrative records to develop an independent estimate of the population. For example, patient demographics such as date of birth, gender, date of death, postal code, ethnicity, blood type, emergency contact information, family doctor, insurance provider data, allergies, major diagnoses, and major medical history form the core of the data for any medical institution, allowing the identification and categorization of a patient for the purpose of statistical analysis.

Demographic analysis estimates are often considered a reliable standard for judging the accuracy of census information. For example, the U.S. Census Bureau expanded its DA categories for the 2010 U.S. Census to include comparative analysis between independent housing estimates, and differences between census address lists at different key times.

== History ==
Demographic thought traces back to antiquity, and was present in many civilizations and cultures like Ancient Greece, Ancient Rome, China and India. Made up of the prefix demo- and the suffix -graphy, the term demography refers to the overall study of population.

Demography is discussed in the works of Greek thinkers such as Herodotus, Thucydides, Hippocrates, Epicurus, Protagoras, Polus, Plato and Aristotle, and Romans such as Cicero, Seneca, Pliny the Elder, Marcus Aurelius, Epictetus, Cato, and Columella.

In the Middle Ages, Christian thinkers devoted much time to refuting the Classical ideas on demography. Important contributors to the field were William of Conches, Bartholomew of Lucca, William of Auvergne, William of Pagula, and Muslim sociologists like Ibn Khaldun.

One of the earliest demographic studies in the modern period was Natural and Political Observations Made upon the Bills of Mortality (1662) by John Graunt, which contains a primitive form of life table. Among the study's findings were that one-third of the children in London died before their sixteenth birthday. Mathematicians, such as Edmond Halley, developed the life table as the basis for life insurance mathematics. Richard Price was credited with the first textbook on life contingencies published in 1771, followed later by Augustus De Morgan, On the Application of Probabilities to Life Contingencies (1838).

In 1755, Benjamin Franklin published his essay Observations Concerning the Increase of Mankind, Peopling of Countries, etc., projecting exponential growth in British colonies. His work influenced Thomas Robert Malthus, who, writing at the end of the 18th century, feared that, if unchecked, population growth would tend to outstrip growth in food production, leading to ever-increasing famine and poverty (see Malthusian catastrophe). Malthus is seen as the intellectual father of ideas of overpopulation and the limits to growth. Later, more sophisticated and realistic models were presented by Benjamin Gompertz and Verhulst.

In 1855, Belgian scholar Achille Guillard defined demography as the natural and social history of the human species or the mathematical knowledge of populations, of their general changes, and of their physical, civil, intellectual, and moral condition.

Newell (1988, pp. 4-5) claims that the first major developments in the 20th century, in what was to become formal demography, were made in three papers by Alfred J. Lotka (1907, 1911 (with F.R. Sharpe), and 1922), which developed a Stable Population Model. This model was similar to Leonhard Euler's earlier, overlooked modeling, which showed how a population with constant fertility and mortality might grow geometrically using a difference equation. Under this geometric growth model, Euler also examined relationships among various demographic indices, showing how they could be used to produce estimates when data were missing. Lotka and Sharpe showed that a closed population, assuming constant both age-specific mortality and fertility, developed along a path leading to a fixed age structure - the Stable Population.

== Methods ==
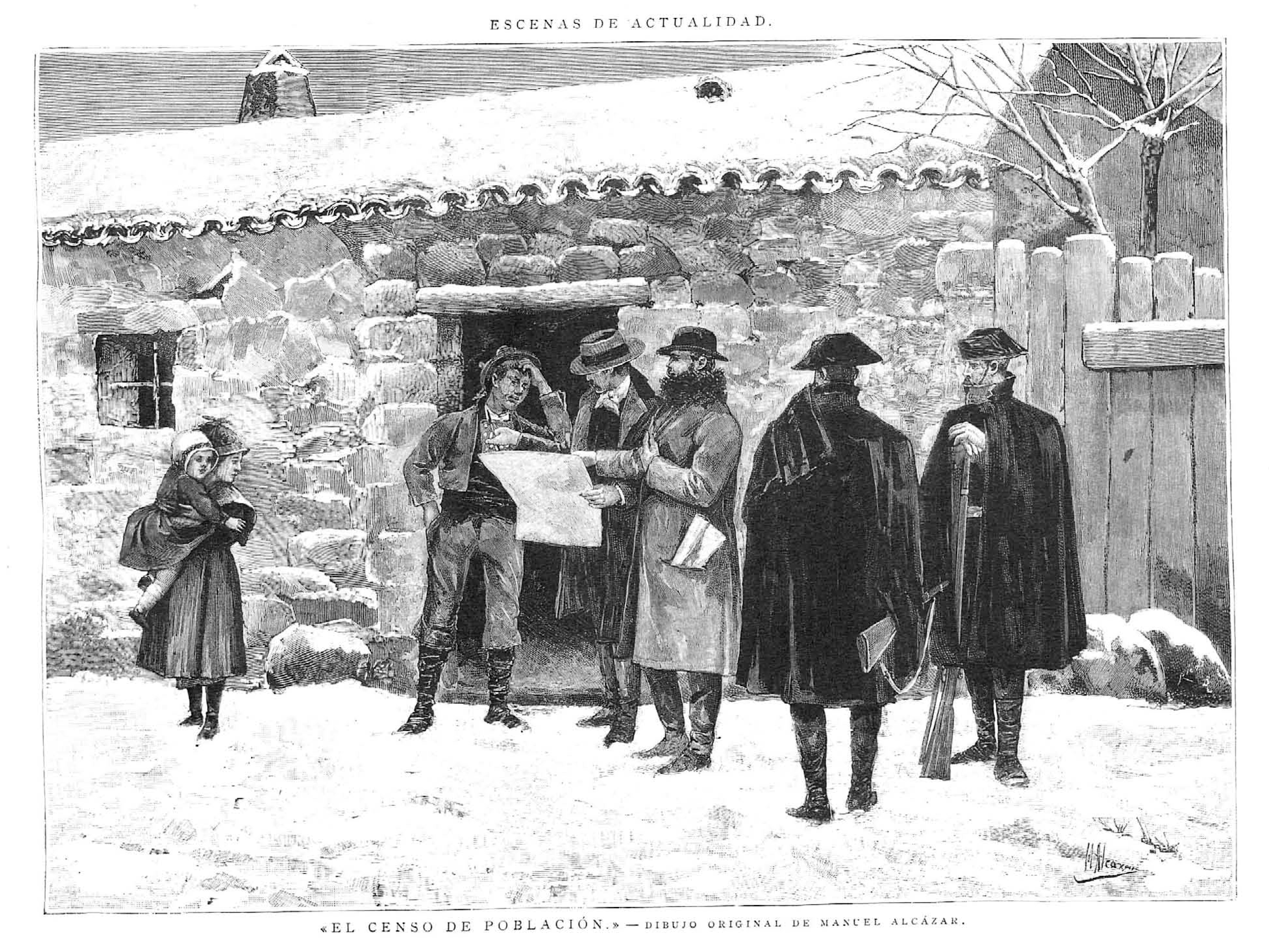
Early censuses and surveys provided demographic data.

=== Direct methods ===
Types of data arising from direct methods
Data type	Examples
Population	Total population, sex ratio, birth rate, death rate
Geography	Place of residence, place of birth, duration of residence
Migration	Foreign-born status, nation of birth, citizenship, arrival date, migrant flows
Social features	Sex, age, marital status, religion, language, ethnicity
Education	Literacy, school attendance, highest educational attainment
Economic	Occupation, industry, employment status, workforce size, personal income
Buildings	Building type (residential vs. non-residential), period of construction
Health	Health status, disability level, live-born children, household deaths
Sensor data	Satellite imaging, surveillance footage, climate logs, road sensors
Administrative	Electronic medical records, hospital visits, insurance claims, bank records

Direct methods calculate measures from empirical records of demographic events and population counts collected through administrative registers, civil registration systems, censuses, surveys, or big data.

A register continuously updates administrative data and attributes for its target population of persons or objects (such as dwellings, buildings or businesses). Registers serve administrative functions of government or private institutions such as "monitoring of taxes, the allocation of pensions, the provision of services, the production of goods, or the administering of bank accounts." Civil registration systems record the occurrence and characteristics of vital events, such as births, deaths, and infant mortality.

A census periodically records information from people within a specific geographic area, attempting to represent each person within this region. The typical interval between censuses is 5 to 10 years. A national census measures total female, and male populations. A census may fail to count a person or count one person multiple times. Demographers may identify and correct these errors by comparing the census's observed male-to-female ratio at each age to the expected ratio at each age.

Surveys record data from a sample rather than the whole population. Although this method can provide more timely or distinct data than a census or register, sampled data may be less comprehensive and less precise for local data. The United Kingdom conducted four consecutive prospective cohort surveys: the 1946 National Survey of Health and Development, the 1958 National Child Development Study, the 1970 British Cohort Study, and the 2000 Millennium Cohort Study. These surveys sampled cohorts to identify generational changes over decades in health, education, development, economic status, and lifestyle choices.

The World Wide Web and electronic device sensors generate big data: high-volume, high-velocity, and highly varied information. Big data originates from multiple sources: administrative records, sensor recordings, mobile phone communications, and social media. Statisticians use specialized methods to process big data, evaluate quality, and fix bias, missing data, or missing identifiers.

Researchers commonly combine these methods. For instance, France's rolling census continuously surveys its population over an extended time to generate nationwide data.

Map of countries by population

Rate of human population growth showing projections for later this century

=== Indirect methods ===
When complete, accurate information is unavailable, demographers use indirect methods; they apply mathematical models to incomplete or proxy data to estimate the desired demographic measurement. This commonly occurs for developing nations and in historical demography.

Demographers use these models to describe a broad range of demographic measures; examples include:

- Survivorship: Parametric models describe survivorship, the probability of surviving from birth to each age. The Gompertz model applies to older adults, the Gompertz–Makeham model applies to all adults, and the Siler model applies to persons of all ages. In the Brass method relational logit system, a linear function relates logit transformed survivorship of a study population to logit transformed survivorship of a standard population. The Lee-Carter model predicts age-specific mortality rates from prior age-specific rates.
- Maternal mortality ratio: The sisterhood method surveys adults about whether their sisters of reproductive age died during pregnancy, childbirth, or the postpartum period. It then applies a model to this survey data to estimate maternal mortality ratios.
- Age-specific fertility rate: The Coale–Trussell model estimates age-specific marital fertility using empirical data of natural age-specific fertility and age-specific fertility control. Statistical probability distributions may also describe age-specific fertility. These include the inverse Gaussian (Hadwiger model), gamma distribution, and beta distribution. Spline methods generate smooth distributions from incomplete data. The Brass relational Gompertz model relates incomplete fertility data in a study population to a standard data set. The Page model of marital fertility estimates fertility rates from a woman's age and duration of marriage.
- Age-specific migration rate: The Rogers-Castro migration model uses multiple exponential functions to describe how migration changes at each age.
- Migration flow: The Gravity migration model, Lowry and gravity push-pull model and theory of intervening opportunities predict where people migrate.

== Standardization and decomposition ==
Demographers use standardization and decomposition methods to compare crude rates between two study populations with differing demographic compositions. Because crude rates for demographic events (births, deaths, or migration) depend on age composition, demographers use age-adjusted rates to exclude this confounding effect.

- Direct standardization computes an age-adjusted rate by applying the age-specific rates of each study population to a standard population.
- Indirect standardization, used when the age-specific rates are unknown, computes a standardized incident ratio, such as the standardized mortality ratio. The product of the standardized incident ratio and the reference population’s crude rate approximates the study population's age-adjusted rate.

An alternative approach, the decomposition method, expresses the difference between crude rates as the sum of two terms: one due to differing age-specific event rates and another due to differing population compositions. Standardization and decomposition methods extend to compositional variables other than age.

== Common rates and ratios ==
- The crude birth rate, the annual number of live births per 1,000 people.
- The general fertility rate, the annual number of live births per 1,000 women of childbearing age (often taken to be from 15 to 49 years old, but sometimes from 15 to 44).
- The age-specific fertility rates, the annual number of live births per 1,000 women in particular age groups (usually age 15–19, 20–24, etc.)
- The crude death rate, the annual number of deaths per 1,000 people.
- The infant mortality rate, the annual number of deaths of children less than 1 year old per 1,000 live births.
- The expectation of life (or life expectancy), the number of years that an individual at a given age could expect to live at present mortality levels.
- The total fertility rate, the number of live births per woman completing her reproductive life, if her childbearing at each age reflected current age-specific fertility rates.
- The replacement level fertility, the average number of children women must have to replace the population for the next generation. For example, the replacement level fertility in the US is 2.11.
- The gross reproduction rate, the number of daughters who would be born to a woman completing her reproductive life at current age-specific fertility rates.
- The net reproduction ratio is the expected number of daughters, per newborn prospective mother, who may or may not survive to and through the ages of childbearing.
- A stable population, one that has had constant crude birth and death rates for such a long period of time that the percentage of people in every age class remains constant, or equivalently, the population pyramid has an unchanging structure.
- A stationary population, one that is both stable and unchanging in size (the difference between crude birth rate and crude death rate is zero).
- Measures of centralisation are concerned with the extent to which an area's population is concentrated in its urban centres.

A stable population does not necessarily remain fixed in size. It can be expanding or shrinking.

The crude death rate, as defined above and applied to a whole population, can give a misleading impression. For example, the number of deaths per 1,000 people can be higher in developed nations than in less-developed countries, despite standards of health being better in developed countries. This is because developed countries have proportionally more older people, who are more likely to die in a given year, so that the overall mortality rate can be higher even if the mortality rate at any given age is lower. A more complete picture of mortality is given by a life table, which summarizes mortality separately at each age. A life table is necessary to give a good estimate of life expectancy.

== Basic equation regarding development of a population ==
Suppose that a country (or other entity) contains Population_{t} persons at time t. What is the size of the population at time t + 1?

$$\text{Population}_{t+1} = \text{Population}_t + \text{Natural Increase}_t + \text{Net Migration}_t$$

Natural increase from time t to t + 1:

$$\text{Natural Increase}_t = \text{Births}_t - \text{Deaths}_t$$

Net migration from time t to t + 1:

$$\text{Net Migration}_t = \text{Immigration}_t - \text{Emigration}_t$$

These basic equations can also be applied to subpopulations. For example, the population size of ethnic groups or nationalities within a given society or country is subject to the same sources of change. When dealing with ethnic groups, however, "net migration" might have to be subdivided into physical migration and ethnic reidentification (assimilation). Individuals who change their ethnic self-labels or whose ethnic classification in government statistics changes over time may be thought of as migrating or moving from one population subcategory to another.

More generally, while the basic demographic equation holds by definition, in practice, the recording and counting of events (births, deaths, immigration, emigration) and the enumeration of the total population are subject to error. So allowance needs to be made for errors in the underlying statistics when accounting for population size or change.

The figure in this section shows the latest (2004) UN (United Nations) WHO projections of world population out to the year 2150 (red = high, orange = medium, green = low). The UN "medium" projection shows world population reaching an approximate equilibrium of 9 billion by 2075. Working independently, demographers at the International Institute for Applied Systems Analysis in Austria expect world population to peak at 9 billion by 2070. Throughout the 21st century, the average age of the population is likely to continue to rise.

=== Science of population ===
Populations can change through three processes: fertility, mortality, and migration. Fertility refers to the number of children a woman has and should be contrasted with fecundity (a woman's childbearing potential). Mortality is the study of the causes, consequences, and measurement of processes affecting death in members of the population. Demographers most commonly study mortality using the life table, a statistical device that provides information about the mortality conditions (most notably the life expectancy) in the population.

Migration refers to the movement of persons from a locality of origin to a destination place across a predefined political boundary. Migration researchers do not designate movements 'migrations' unless they are somewhat permanent. Thus, demographers do not consider tourists and travellers to be migrating. While demographers who study migration typically rely on census data on place of residence, indirect data sources, including tax forms and labour force surveys, are also important.

Demography is widely taught today at many universities around the world, attracting students with initial training in the social sciences, statistics, or health studies. Being at the crossroads of several disciplines such as sociology, economics, epidemiology, geography, anthropology and history, demography offers tools to approach a large range of population issues by combining a more technical quantitative approach that represents the core of the discipline with many other methods borrowed from social or other sciences. Demographic research is conducted in universities, research institutes, statistical departments, and several international agencies. Population institutions are part of the CICRED (International Committee for Coordination of Demographic Research) network while most individual scientists engaged in demographic research are members of the International Union for the Scientific Study of Population, or a national association such as the Population Association of America in the United States, or affiliates of the Federation of Canadian Demographers in Canada.

== Population composition ==
World demography by age composition from 1950 to 2100 (projected).

Population composition is the description of a population defined by characteristics such as age, race, sex, or marital status. These descriptions can be necessary for understanding the social dynamics from historical and comparative research. These data are often compared using a population pyramid.

Population composition is also a very important part of historical research. Information ranging back hundreds of years is not always worthwhile because the number of people for whom data are available may not provide the information that is important (such as population size). A lack of information about the original data-collection procedures may prevent an accurate evaluation of data quality.

== Population change ==
Change in ethnic population composition from 1990 to 2020 in the USA.

Population change is analyzed by measuring the difference between two population sizes. Global population continues to rise, which makes population change an essential component of demographics. This is calculated by subtracting the population size from an earlier census from the current population size. The best way to measure population change is to use the intercensal percentage change. The intercensal percentage change is the absolute change in population between the censuses divided by the population size in the earlier census. Next, multiply this by a hundredfold to receive a percentage. When this statistic is achieved, the population growth between two or more nations of different sizes can be accurately measured and examined. The population can change in terms of population composition.

== Effects ==
The long-term sustainability of a population is described by the demographic sustainability. The sustainability of contemporary pay-as-you-go pensions depends on sustainable demographics and total fertility rates.

=== Turnover and in internal labor markets ===
People decide to leave organizations for many reasons, such as better job opportunities, dissatisfaction, and family concerns. The causes of turnover can be split into two factors: one linked to the organization's culture, and the other to all other factors. People who do not fully accept a culture might leave voluntarily. Or, some individuals might leave because they fail to fit in or change within a particular organization.

=== Organizational ecology ===
A basic definition of population ecology is the study of the distribution and abundance of organisms. In relation to organizations and demography, organizations face various liabilities that affect their continued survival. Hospitals, like all other large and complex organizations, are impacted by the environment in which they work. For example, a study examined the closure of acute care hospitals in Florida during a specific period. The study examined the effect size, age, and niche density of these particular hospitals. A population theory says that organizational outcomes are mostly determined by environmental factors. Among the theory's several factors, four apply to the hospital closure example: size, age, the density of niches in which organizations operate, and the density of niches in which organizations are established.

Problems in which demographers may be called upon to assist business organizations include determining the best prospective location for a branch store or service outlet, predicting demand for a new product, and analysing certain dynamics of a company's workforce. Choosing a new location for a branch of a bank, choosing the area in which to start a new supermarket, consulting a bank loan officer that a particular location would be a beneficial site to start a car wash, and determining what shopping area would be best to buy and be redeveloped in metropolis area are types of problems in which demographers can be called upon. Standardization is a useful demographic technique for analysing a business. It can be used as an interpretive and analytical tool for comparing different markets.

== See also ==
- Biodemography
- Biodemography of human longevity
- Demographics of the world
- Demographic economics
- Demographic engineering
- Gompertz–Makeham law of mortality
- Linguistic demography
- List of demographics articles
- Medieval demography
- National Security Study Memorandum 200 of 1974
- NRS social grade
- Political demography
- Population biology
- Population dynamics
- Population geography
- Population reconstruction
- Population statistics
- Religious demography
- Replacement migration
- Reproductive health

=== Social surveys ===
- Current Population Survey (CPS)
- Demographic and Health Surveys (DHS)
- European Social Survey (ESS)
- General Social Survey (GSS)
- German General Social Survey (ALLBUS)
- Multiple Indicator Cluster Surveys (MICS)
- National Longitudinal Survey (NLS)
- Panel Study of Income Dynamics (PSID)
- Performance Monitoring and Accountability 2020 (PMA2020)
- Socio-Economic Panel (SOEP, German)
- World Values Survey (WVS)

=== Organizations ===
- Global Social Change Research Project (United States)
- Institut national d'études démographiques (INED) (France)
- Max Planck Institute for Demographic Research (Germany)
- Office of Population Research (Princeton University) (United States)
- Population Council (United States)
- Population Studies Center at the University of Michigan (United States)
- Vienna Institute of Demography (VID) (Austria)
- Wittgenstein Centre for Demography and Global Human Capital (Austria)

=== Scientific journals ===
- Brazilian Journal of Population Studies
- Cahiers québécois de démographie
- Demography
- Population and Development Review
