= James W. B. Douglas =

British social researcher (1914–1992)

- Born: 1914; Alperton, Middlesex
- Died: 1992 (aged 77–78)
- Education: Magdalen College, Oxford, St Bartholomew's Hospital
- Known for: Establishing the National Survey of Health & Development Study
- Scientific career
- Fields: Social Research
- Workplaces: Exeter College, Royal College of Obstetricians and Gynaecologists

James William Bruce Douglas (1914 – 1992) was a British social researcher. Douglas was responsible for the National Survey of Health & Development that in turn led to other national birth cohort studies, such as the National Child Development Study, the 1970 British Cohort Study and the Millennium Cohort Study.

== Life ==
Douglas was born in Alperton, in 1914 and was the son of a clergyman. Upon receiving a Demy, Douglas attended Magdalen College, Oxford, to study Natural sciences and Physiology and was eventually awarded a First class honours degree. He also received a college Choral scholarship, which enabled him to continue studying at Magdalen, and he gained the further degree of B.Sc. in Primate Behaviour. His PhD thesis was on the study of primate behaviour and was supervised by Solomon Zuckerman.

In 1934, Douglas started his clinical training at the College of St Bartholomew's Hospital and in 1939 gained the usual professional qualifications of MB.BCh. After qualifying, he worked in the anatomy and physiology departments of the University of Oxford.

== Career ==
Douglas was a pacifist and conscientious objector, so during World War II he served as Scientific Officer in the Ministry of Social Security, conducting research into Animal Behaviour, in a unit that was supervised by Solly Zuckerman. Between 1941 and 1942, Douglas worked as a lecturer in Physiology at Exeter College. For the rest of the war period, Douglas was a Research Officer at the Oxford Extra Mural Unit of the Ministry of Home Security. As part of this war work, Douglas was involved in a Field Survey of Air-Raid Casualties that aimed to understand the mechanisms by which bomb blasts caused injury and death. This provided him with valuable experience of conducting and analysing large surveys.

Prior to the war, the falling birth rate in Britain had been a major concern and during the war the idea of a survey was developed by the Population Investigation Committee, an independent group, based at the London School of Economics. The committee appointed the demographer and sociologist, David Glass, to coordinate research and he suggested that Douglas would be a suitable person to conduct the survey. Frank Yates, a statistical advisor to Zuckerman and Dr Richard Schilling, chairman of the Industrial Health Research Board, also supported Douglas's appointment. Douglas like most people at the time, was particularly concerned with inequality, health in society and at home, and family circumstances. So when the job offer presented itself to study Obstetrics in relation to the falling birth rate, Douglas jumped at the opportunity; it would later define his whole life's work. Douglas was appointed to the position of Executive Director of the Maternity Survey of the Joint Committee of the Royal College of Obstetricians and Gynaecologists and the Population Investigation Committee under the aegis of the Royal Commission on Population. Notable members of the committee included vice-chairman, Sir Alan Moncrieff, with Dermod MacCarthy also on the committee.

The Maternity Survey was designed to identify all babies born, during one week, 3–9 March 1946 throughout England, Wales, and Scotland, and aimed to answer five key questions:

1. What was the availability of maternity services to different social classes in different parts of the country?
2. What use was made of these services?
3. How effective were the services in educating mothers, and in reducing mortality among mothers and infants?
4. What was the extent of need for domestic help during pregnancy and the puerperium?
5. What was the nature and extent of expenditure on child-birth?

The survey was funded by the Nuffield Foundation and the National Birthday Trust Fund. The study was run by Douglas assisted by Griselda Rowntree and the interviews were performed by health visitors about 2 months after the mothers had given birth. Information on the forms collected by the health visitors was transcribed by students and transferred to punched cards by a team of women. The findings provided information about the high costs of having a baby, and showed the need to change the rules governing anaesthesia in labour. It also showed marked differences in infant survival rates depending on what region of Great Britain the mother was from, and the profound effects of social class on the outcomes of pregnancies. The results of the study were published in 1948 in a book, 'Maternity in Great Britain'. In the same year the National Health Service (NHS) was founded and medical care for pregnancy and birth became free. While writing up the data, Douglas and Glass came up with the idea of following up participants as a cohort study, and the National Survey of Health and Development (NSHD) came into being.

== National Survey of Health and Development (NSHD) ==
The NSHD has been described as "the granddaddy of all cohort studies". To create the cohort, Douglas selected 5361 children representative of all social classes from the offspring of the 13,687 mothers who had participated in the original survey. These cohort members are often termed 'Douglas Babies'. Over the years the scope of the survey has expanded to include a wide range of social, physical and health measures. The study is still on-going and participants have been followed up through 24 data collections up to age 68 to 69, with future collections planned.

== Bibliography ==
Douglas published over 30 books during this career. These were considered his most important publications:

- Children under five : the results of a national survey made by a Joint Committee of the Institute of Child Health (University of London) the Society of Medical Officers of Health and the Population Investigation Committee., James W.B. Douglas; J M Bloomfield., London : Allen & Unwin, 1958.,
- The home and the school : a study of ability and attainment in the primary school., James W.B. Douglas; Tessa Chester; C. Nicholls & Co. Ltd.; Penerbitan Buku Panther. St. Albans : Panther Books, 1976.
- All our future : a longitudinal study of secondary education, James W.B. Douglas; J M Ross; H R Simpson. London : Panther, 1971, ©1968.

Some of his most important published articles:

- Douglas, J.W.B. and Rowntree, G. (1949) Supplementary maternal and child health services, part I, postnatal care. part II, nurseries. Population Studies, 3, 205–226.
- Douglas, J.W.B. (1950) The extent of breast-feeding in Great Britain in 1946 with specialreference to the health and survival of children. Journal of Obstetrics of the British Empire, 57, 336–362.
- Douglas, J.W.B. (1950) Some factors associated with prematurity. Journal of Obstetrics and Gynaecology of the British Empire, 57, 143–170.
- Douglas, J.W.B. (1951) The health and survival of children in different social classes, the results of a national survey. Lancet, (ii), 440–446.
- Douglas, J.W.B. (1951) Social class differences in health and survival during the first two years of life, the results of a national survey. Population Studies, 5, 35–38.
- Douglas, J.W.B. (1950) Deux enquêtes nationales sur la maternité et la santé de l'enfant en Grande Bretagne. Population, 4, 625–642.
- Douglas, J.W.B. (1951) The health and survival of children in different social classes, the results of a national survey. Lancet, (ii), 440–446.
- Douglas, J.W.B. (1951) Social class differences in health and survival during the first two years of life, the results of a national survey. Population Studies, 5, 35–38.
- Douglas, J.W.B. (1954) Birthweight and the history of breastfeeding. Lancet, (ii), 685–688.
- Douglas, J.W.B. and Mogford, C. (1953) The growth of premature children. Archives of Disease in Childhood, 28, 436–445.
- Douglas, J.W.B. and Mogford, C. (1953) The health of premature children, during the first four years of life, British Medical Journal, (i), 748–754.
- Douglas, J.W.B. (1952) Studies in morbidity in childhood (discussion) Proceedings of the Royal Society of Medicine, 45, 116–120.
- Douglas, J.W.B. (1954) Birthweight and the history of breastfeeding. Lancet, (ii), 685–688.
- Douglas, J.W.B. (1960) Premature children at primary schools. British Medical Journal, (i), 1008–1013.
- Douglas, J.W.B. (1956) The mental ability of premature children. British Medical Journal, (i), 1210–1214.
- Douglas, J.W.B. (1956) The age at which premature children walk. Medical Officer, 95, 33–35.
- Douglas, J.W.B. (1960) The development of prematurely born children. Journal of the Medical Women's Federation, 42(a), 166–169.
- Douglas, J.W.B. (1964) Ability and adjustment of children who have had measles. British Medical Journal, 2, 1301–1303.
- Mulligan, D.G., Douglas, J.W.B., Hammond, W.A. and Tizard, J. (1963) Delinquency and symptoms of maladjustment - the findings of a longitudinal study. Proceedings of the Royal Society of Medicine, 56, 1083–1086.
- Douglas, J.W.B. (1962) The height of boys and girls and their home environment. In Hottinger, A. & Berger, H. (Eds), Modern Problems in Paediatrics, VII, 178–182.
- Douglas, J.W.B. (1962) Reproductive loss. In Welford, A.T., Argyle, M., Glass, D.V. and Morris, J.N. (Eds), Society, Problems and Methods of Study. Routledge and Kegan Paul Ltd., London pp. 429–442.
- Douglas, J.W.B. and Mulligan, D.G. (1961) Emotional adjustment and educational achievement - the preliminary results of a longitudinal study of a national sample of children. Proceedings of the Royal Society of Medicine, 54, 885–891.
- Douglas, J.W.B. and Simpson H.R. (1964) Height in relation to puberty, family size and social class. A longitudinal study. Milbank Memorial Fund Quarterly, 42, 20–35.32. Cooper, J.E. (1965) Epilepsy in a longitudinal survey of 5,000 Children. British Medical Journal, (i), 1020–1022.
- Douglas, J.W.B. (1964) The environmental challenge in early childhood. Public Health, 78, 195–202.
- Douglas, J.W.B. and Ross, J.M. (1968) Characteristics of delinquent boys and their homes. In Thoday, J.M. and Parkes, A.S. (Eds), Genetic and Environmental Influences on Behaviour. Oliver and Boyd, Edinburgh, pp. 114–127.
- Douglas, J.W.B. and Waller, R.E. (1966) Air pollution and respiratory infection in children. British Journal of Preventive and Social Medicine, 20, 1–8.
- Douglas, J.W.B. (1969) Effects of early environment on later development. Journal of the Royal College of Physicians, 3, 359–364.
- Douglas, J.W.B. (1970) Broken families and child behaviour. Journal of the Royal College of Physicians, London, 4, 203–210.
- Douglas, J.W.B. (1973) Prospective study of effectiveness of tonsillectomy in children. Proceedings of 6th International Scientific Meeting of the International Epidemiological Association. Savremena Administracija, Belgrade, 941–950.
- Douglas, J.W.B. (1973) Early disturbing events and later enuresis. In Kolvin, I., MacKeith, R.C. and Meadow, S.R. (Eds), Bladder Control and Enuresis. Spastics International Medical Publishers, London, pp. 109–117.
- Douglas, J.W.B. (1975) Longitudinal studies in the United Kingdom. In Wallace, H.M. (Ed), Health Care of Mothers and Children in National Health Services: Implications for the United States. Ballinger, Cambridge, Mass.
- Douglas, J.W.B. (1975) Early hospital admissions and later disturbances of behaviour and learning. Developmental Medicine and Child Neurology, 17, 456–480.
- Douglas, J.W.B. and Gear, R. (1976) Children of low birthweight in the 1946 national cohort. Archives of Disease in Childhood, 51, 820–827.

== Awards ==
Douglas was awarded the prestigious James Spence Medal in 1984, by the Royal College of Paediatrics and Child Health.
