= Jane Elliott (sociologist) =

British sociologist and academic (born 1966)

professor Jane Elliott FAcSS
- Born: Barbara Jane Elliott; 25 January 1966 (age 60)

Academic background
- Education: Sharnbrook Upper School; Bedford College of Higher Education
- Alma mater: King's College, Cambridge; University of Manchester

Academic work
- Discipline: Sociology
- Sub-discipline: Longitudinal study Gender studies Statistical inference
- Institutions: University of Exeter; University of Cambridge; Newnham College, Cambridge; University of Manchester; University of Liverpool; Institute of Education, University of London

Barbara Jane Elliott CBE FAcSS (born 25 January 1966) is a British sociologist and academic. She is Professor of Sociology at the University of Exeter. From October 2014 to September 2017 she was chief executive of the Economic and Social Research Council. Her research uses longitudinal, qualitative and quantitative methodologies to explore issues of gender and employment.

== Early life ==
Elliott was born on 25 January 1966 to Keith Elliott and Barbara Joy Elliott. She was educated at Sharnbrook Upper School and Bedford College of Higher Education. She studied mathematics and then social and political science at King's College, Cambridge. She graduated in 1987 with an upper second class Bachelor of Arts (BA) degree. Later, she undertook post-graduate research in sociology at the University of Manchester, completing her Doctor of Philosophy degree in 2001. Her thesis was titled Success stories: Narrative representations of women's lives?.

== Academic career ==
Elliott began her academic career as a Research Associate at the University of Cambridge from 1987 to 1992. From 1992 to 1994, she was a fellow and lecturer in Social and Political Sciences at Newnham College, Cambridge. She moved to the University of Manchester, where she was a research fellow from 1994 to 1999.

She moved from research to teaching when she became a lecturer in sociology at the University of Liverpool in 1999. She was a Visiting Lecturer at Harvard University during the 2002/2003 academic year. In 2004, she moved to the Institute of Education, University of London. She was the Principal Investigator of the 1958 and 1970 British birth cohort studies. She was promoted to Professor of Sociology in 2009.

From 2010 to 2014, Elliot was director of the Centre for Longitudinal Studies. The centre hosts the 1958 National Child Development Study, 1970 British Cohort Study, and Millennium Cohort Study. In October 2014, she became chief executive and deputy chair of the Economic and Social Research Council. while retaining her title as professor of sociology at the University of London. She became professor of sociology at the University of Exeter in October 2017.

== Honours ==
In March 2015, Elliott was elected a Fellow of the Academy of Social Sciences (FAcSS).

She was appointed Commander of the Order of the British Empire (CBE) in the 2020 New Year Honours for services to the social sciences.

== Selected works ==
- Elliott, Jane (2005). Using narrative in social research: qualitative and quantitative approaches. London: Sage Publications. ISBN 1412900409.
- Marsh, Catherine; Elliott, Jane (2008). Exploring data: an introduction to data analysis for social scientists (2nd ed.). Cambridge: Polity Press. ISBN 978-0745622828.
