= Prehistoric demography =

Study of human demography in prehistory

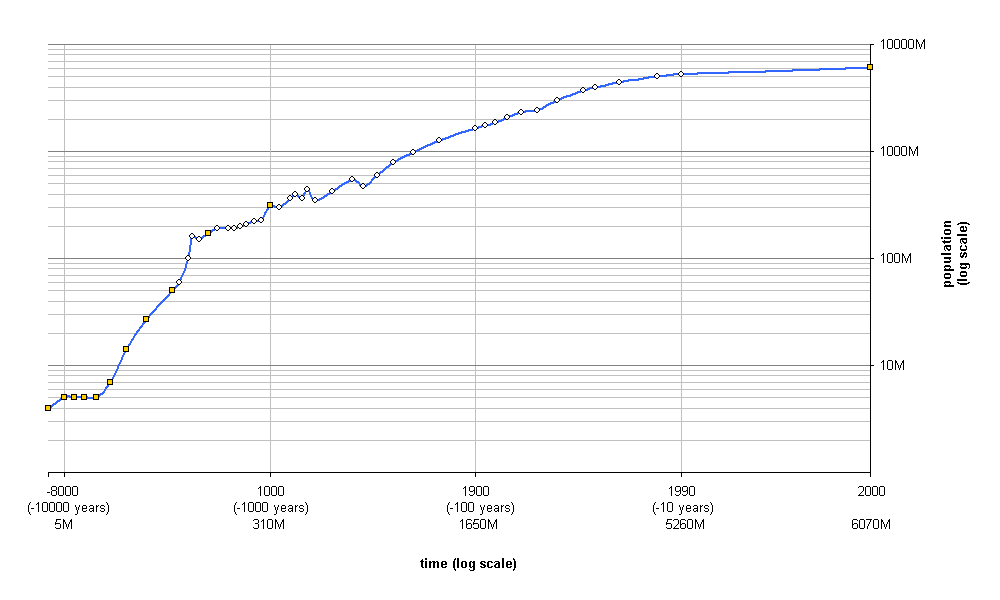
Log-log graph depicting estimates of the world population from 10,000 BCE to 2000 CE

Prehistoric demography, palaeodemography or archaeological demography is the study of human and hominid demography in prehistory.

More specifically, palaeodemography looks at the changes in pre-modern populations in order to determine something about the influences on the lifespan and health of earlier peoples. Reconstructions of ancient population sizes and dynamics are based on bioarchaeology, ancient DNA, and inference from modern population genetics.

== Methods ==
=== Skeletal analysis ===
Skeletal analysis can yield information such as an estimation of age at time of death. There are numerous methods that can be used; in addition to age estimation and sex estimation, someone versed in basic osteology can ascertain a minimum number of individuals (or MNI) in cluttered contexts—such as in mass graves or an ossuary. This is important, as it is not always obvious how many bodies compose the bones sitting in a heap as they are excavated.

Occasionally, historical disease prevalence for illnesses such as leprosy can also be determined from bone restructuring and deterioration. Paleopathology, as these investigations are called, can be useful in accurate estimation of mortality rates.

=== Genetic analysis ===
The increasing availability of DNA sequencing since the late 1990s has allowed estimates on Paleolithic effective population sizes. Such models suggest a human effective population size of the order of 10,000 individuals for the Late Pleistocene. This includes only the breeding population that produced descendants over the long term, and the actual population may have been substantially larger (in the six digits). Sherry et al. (1997) based on Alu elements estimated a roughly constant effective population size of the order of 18,000 individuals for the population of Homo ancestral to modern humans over the past one to two million years. Huff et al. (2010) rejected all models with an ancient effective population size larger than 26,000. For ca. 130,000 years ago, Sjödin et al. (2012) estimate an effective population size of the order of 10,000 to 30,000 individuals, and infer an actual "census population" of early Homo sapiens of roughly 100,000 to 300,000 individuals. The authors also note that their model disfavours the assumption of an early (pre-Out-of-Africa) population bottleneck affecting all of Homo sapiens.

=== Estimates of habitable land area ===
According to a 2015 study, the total land area of Africa, Eurasia, and Sahul that was habitable to humans during the Last Glacial Maximum (LGM) was around 76,959,712.4 km^{2}. Based on a dataset of average population density of hunter-gatherer groups collected by Lewis R. Binford, which indicate a mean density of 0.1223 humans per km^{2} and a median density of 0.0444 humans per km^{2}, the combined human population of Africa and Eurasia at the time of the LGM would have been between 2,998,820 and 8,260,262 people. Alternatively, if a human population density based on that of modern medium to large-bodied carnivores, whose median density is 0.0275 individuals per km^{2} and whose mean density is 0.0384 individuals per km^{2}, is used, a total Afro-Eurasian human population of 2,120,000 to 2,950,000 is obtained. Sahul's population density was significantly lower than that of Afro-Eurasia, being calculated as only 0.005 humans per km^{2} during the time just prior to the LGM. As a consequence, assuming Sahul possessed an estimated total habitable land area of 9,418,730.8 km^{2}, its population was at most 47,000 at the time of the LGM, and probably less than that given that its population is believed to have declined by as much as 61% during the LGM, a demographic trend supported by archaeological evidence, and it thus would have possessed an even lower actual population density than the calculated density from just before the LGM.

== Hominid population estimates ==
It is estimated by J. Lawrence Angel that the average life span of hominids on the African savanna between 4,000,000 and 200,000 years ago was 20 years. This means that the population would be completely renewed about five times per century, assuming that infant mortality has already been accounted for. It is further estimated that the population of hominids in Africa fluctuated between 10,000 and 100,000 individuals, thus averaging about 50,000 individuals. Multiplying 40,000 centuries by 50,000 to 500,000 individuals per century yields a total of 2 billion to 20 billion hominids that lived during that approximately 4,000,000-year time span.

== See also ==
- Neolithic decline
- Historical demography
- Population reconstruction
- Estimates of historical world population
