= Fraser of Allander Institute =

British economics research institute

The Fraser of Allander Institute
- Abbreviation: FAI
- Formation: 1975; 51 years ago
- Type: Research institute
- Location: Glasgow, Scotland
- Director: Mairi Spowage
- Parent organization: University of Strathclyde
- Website: www.strath.ac.uk/fraser Official blog

The Fraser of Allander Institute, abbreviated as FAI, is an independent research unit and part of the Department of Economics at the University of Strathclyde. It specialises in researching the Scottish economy.

== History ==
The Fraser of Allander Institute was formed by the University of Strathclyde in 1975. Its primary goal is to research the Scottish economy. It is based in Glasgow, Scotland.

From 2017, Deloitte announced that they would be acting as the main sponsor of the Fraser of Allander Institute Economic Commentary.

== Research overview ==
=== Allander series ===
The Allander series was produced by the FAI to study the economic future of Scotland. The series has had contributions from a number of notable economists. These have included Heather Joshi, Robert E. Wright and Nicholas Crafts. Other notable contributors include James Heckman and Paul Krugman, both winners of the Nobel prize in Economics, as well as William Baumol who was shortlisted for the Nobel prize in Economics.

The series has led to a number of publications, research papers, a lecture series and literature specialising in the regional context. The content from the series has contributed to building various economic models and strategies, including the Scottish government's economic strategy.

=== Notable outputs ===
In March 2018, the FAI released its economic commentary on the Scottish economy.

== Commissioned works ==
=== Specialist research ===
In 2014, the FAI produced a paper studying the links between constitutional change and inequality affected Scotland. It was published in the Oxford Review of Economic Policy.

Following the Brexit vote, the FAI carried out research into the potential effects of Brexit on different sectors within the Scottish economy. The study covered the various outcomes of Brexit and how it could affect Scotland. A bad outcome for Scotland could result in a reduction in GDP of £8 billion, jobs by 80,000 and wages an average of £2,000 per year. While the report showed that a Hard Brexit could lead to problems, it was stated that some sectors in Scotland would fare quite well, when compared to the rest of the UK. In August 2018, the FAI has published a survey of Scottish businesses on their preparations for Brexit. The survey found that 44% of the Scottish businesses had noted a negative impact since the referendum on European Union membership.

==== Consultancy projects ====
The FAI studied the economic impact of college graduates in Scotland. The research showed that colleges could generate £20 billion for the Scottish economy.

In March 2018, the FAI was commissioned to research the economic impact of the commercial property sector on the Scottish economy. According to the data the sector contributed £2.4 billion to the Scottish economy.

The FAI have also studied the economic impact of the pharmaceutical sector in Scotland.
