= Diana Kuh =

British epidemiologist and academic

Diana Jane Lewin Kuh
- Education: University of Cambridge; London School of Economics
- Scientific career
- Workplaces: University College London
- Thesis: Assessing the influence of early life on adult health (1993)

Diana Jane Lewin Kuh is a British epidemiologist who is an emeritus professor of Life Course Epidemiology at University College London. She was formerly Scientific Director of the National Survey of Health and Development and the founding Director of the MRC Unit for Lifelong Health and Ageing. Kuh was named as a Clarivate Highly Cited Researcher in 2018 and 2020 and as a top female scientist by Research.com in 2024.

== Early life and education ==
Kuh studied economics at the University of Cambridge, graduating in 1974. She moved to the University of Exeter in 1975, where she worked in the Operational Research Unit using mainframe computer models to allocate funding for healthcare. She then joined the Paediatric Research Unit at Exeter, as a research fellow, under Dr Frederic Brimblecombe, where she investigated the health needs of adolescents and young adults with disabilities.

== Research and career ==
In 1987, Kuh started working on the National Survey of Health and Development, a birth cohort study that followed over 5,000 participants from their births in one week in March 1946. She became Scientific Director of the National Survey of Health and Development in 2007. Her first work using the cohort study looked to understand the origins of cardiovascular disease and the contributions of early exposure. This became the basis of her doctoral research, earning a PhD at London School of Economics in 1993.

Kuh became interested in women's health in the early nineties. She took the opportunity to understand the menopause transition from data collected from female study members when they turned 43 years old, and annually between 47 and 54 years. Her research showed that breastfeeding, better socioeconomic circumstances and higher cognitive ability children correlated with later menopause. She went on to show the relationship between menopause, bone density and cardiovascular function. She worked with Gita Mishra to study premature and early menopause. Together they showed that women with recurrent risk miscarriages were more likely to experience menopause early, and that Asian women faced a greater risk than other ethnicities. She also showed that later menopause was slightly beneficial to memory. Kuh co-wrote A Life Course Approach to Women's Health, which explored the long-term influence of foetal, childhood and younger adult experiences on later health.

Kuh was instrumental in creating and advancing the field of life course epidemiology with Prof. Yoav Ben-Shlomo (University of Bristol) and has over 500 publications. She co-edited A life course approach to chronic disease epidemiology, first published in 1997, and now in its third edition. She also co-edited A life course approach to healthy ageing. Her research showed that early life disadvantage has a profound impact on adult health and ageing. This included musculoskeletal ageing: for example, childhood adversity, lower birthweight, and earlier puberty were persistently associated with lower adult grip strength.

She was elected to the Academy of Medical Sciences in 2015.

== Selected publications ==
- NCD Risk Factor Collaboration (NCD-RisC); Erkin Mirrakhimov; George Stergiou; et al. (10 October 2017). "Worldwide trends in body-mass index, underweight, overweight, and obesity from 1975 to 2016: a pooled analysis of 2416 population-based measurement studies in 128·9 million children, adolescents, and adults". The Lancet. 390 (10113): 2627–2642. doi:10.1016/s0140-6736(17)32129-3. ISSN 0140-6736. PMC 5735219. PMID 29029897. Wikidata Q45370518.
- Yoav Ben-Shlomo; Diana Kuh (1 April 2002). "A life course approach to chronic disease epidemiology: conceptual models, empirical challenges and interdisciplinary perspectives". International Journal of Epidemiology. 31 (2): 285–293. doi:10.1093/ije/31.2.285. ISSN 0300-5771. PMID 11980781. Wikidata Q78019925.
- D. Kuh; Y. Ben-Shlomo; J. Lynch; J. Hallqvist; C. Power (1 October 2003). "Life course epidemiology" (PDF). Journal of Epidemiology and Community Health. 57 (10): 778–783. doi:10.1136/jech.57.10.778. ISSN 0143-005X. PMC 1732305. PMID 14573579. Wikidata Q35409893.
