= Barbara Maughan =

British academic

Barbara Maughan is a Professor of Developmental Epidemiology at the Social, Genetic and Developmental Psychiatry Centre, Institute of Psychiatry. Her research focuses on mental health problems in children and adolescents.

Maughan is a member of the Access Committee for CLS Cohorts, which governs the genetic and biomedical data held on the 1958 Birth Cohort (National Child Development Study).

== Selected publications ==
- Bowes, Lucy; Maughan, Barbara; Ball, Harriet; Shakoor, Sania; Ouellet-Morin, Isabelle; Caspi, Avshalom; Moffitt, Terrie E.; Arseneault, Louise (2013). "Chronic bullying victimization across school transitions: The role of genetic and environmental influences". Development and Psychopathology. 25 (2): 333–346. doi:10.1017/S0954579412001095. PMC 3881278. PMID 23627948.
- Rowe, Richard; Maughan, Barbara; Moran, Paul; Ford, Tamsin; Briskman, Jackie; Goodman, Robert (2010). "The role of callous and unemotional traits in the diagnosis of conduct disorder". Journal of Child Psychology and Psychiatry. 51 (6): 688–695. doi:10.1111/j.1469-7610.2009.02199.x. PMID 20039995.
- Collishaw, Stephan; Maughan, Barbara; Goodman, Robert; Pickles, Andrew (2004). "Time trends in adolescent mental health". Journal of Child Psychology and Psychiatry. 45 (8): 1350–1362. doi:10.1111/j.1469-7610.2004.00335.x. PMID 15482496.
