= Michael Wadsworth =

Michael Wadsworth may refer to:

- Mick Wadsworth (born 1950), English football coach and former player
- Michael Wadsworth (sociologist), British sociologist and socio-medical researcher, director of the National Survey of Health & Development (1982–2006)
- Mike Wadsworth (1943–2004), Canadian football player and ambassador to Ireland
