= Molly F. Mare =

British marine biologist

- Born: Mary Florence Mare; 10 July 1914; Birmingham, England
- Died: 27 August 1997 (aged 83)
- Other names: Molly F. Spooner, Mary F. Spooner, Mary F. Mare
- Spouse: Malcolm Spooner
- Awards: Bathurst Research Studentship 1938; Maitland Balfour Research Studentship, 1939; MBE 1977
- Scientific career
- Fields: Marine biologist
- Institutions: University of Cambridge; Newnham College, Cambridge
- Thesis: The significance of micro-organisms and organic detritus in the food chains of a marine benthic community

Mary Florence "Molly" Mare (10 July 1914 – 27 August 1997), married name Spooner, was a British marine biologist who introduced the term meiobenthos in 1942. She was also an internationally recognized expert on oil spills.

== Significant research ==
Mare's study of marine food cycle in sea mud led her to introduce the new term meiobenthos to join the terminology of macrobenthos and microbenthos. This has to allow improved understanding of marine organisms involved in these cycles through clearer reference to groupings by size. The importance of this approach is shown by the continuous reference to her work by other marine biologists into the 21st century.

Following the grounding of the oil tanker Torrey Canyon on the west of the Scilly Isles, Mare returned to her life as a researcher after taking a break during the 1950s. She studied the effects of the oil spill and contributed to the book on the disastrous oil spill called Torrey Canyon Pollution and Marine Life (1970). A tool called a dispersant was used to try to clean up this oil spill and Mare was one of the first people to recognize that these could be causing more damage than the oil spill itself. This research led her to be known as an oil spill expert to the rest of the world.

== Early career and life ==
Mare won a scholarship to Newnham College, Cambridge where she began her studies of marine biology. In 1936 she took part in the Easter class of the Marine Biological Association (MBA). Mare received a Bathurst Research Studentship in 1938, following her graduation from Newnham. In 1939 she received a Maitland Balfour Research Studentship. These Studentships allowed her to spend two years at the MBA in Plymouth where she primarily started her career.

== Personal life ==
Molly F. Mare married Malcolm Spooner, a zoologist at the Marine Biological Association Laboratory on 14 May 1943. Until 1945 she lived away from her husband while she conducted research on antifouling of ships at the Millport Marine Laboratory located near Glasgow. They had two children, including Heather. In 1948 the family of four moved to Crapstone.

Her husband, Malcolm Spooner, worked on a long-term study of dwarf oak trees in Wistman's Wood and she helped him significantly with this work. They also undertook recording work for the Atlas of the Devon Flora (1984).

== Awards and recognition ==
In 1973 Mare was appointed the Department of the Environment's advisor on oil pollution precautions and procedures.

After she retired from active research in 1976, she was appointed a Member of the Order of the British Empire in 1977 for her work on the effect of oil pollution on marine life.

She was a founding member of the Devon Wildlife Trust and was its vice president in 1987.

Her bequest to the Marine Biological Association of the United Kingdom was to encourage undergraduate students to experience marine biological research every year.
