= Alice Jane Green =

Australian headmistress

Alice Jane Greene
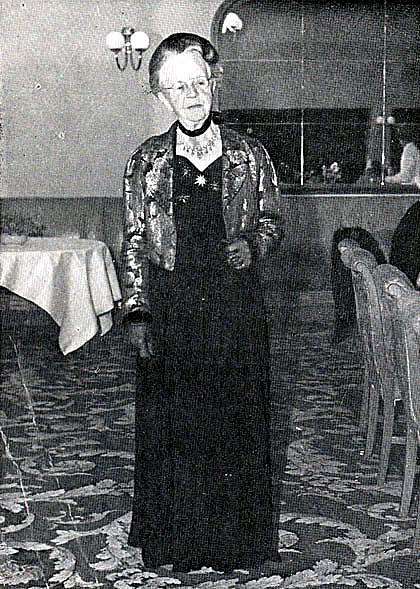
- Born: Alice Jane Green; July 26, 1863; Bridport
- Died: January 8, 1966 (aged 102); Wynnum
- Education: London Day Training College
- Known for: founding head of Moreton Bay College
- Successor: Elsie Green

Alice Jane Greene born Alice Jane Green (July 26, 1863 – January 8, 1966) was an Australian headmistress who was born in the UK. She and her sister founded Moreton Bay College.

== Life ==
Green was born in Bridport in Dorset in 1863. Her Methodist parents were Ellen Webber (born Greenham) and her husband John Ily Green. She was one of their eleven children. Her family soon moved to the Welsh capital of Cardiff. Alice qualified to be a teacher at the London Day Training College and she taught Welsh secondary students.

Her father emigrated to Australia in 1879 and three years later she and her sister who was also a trained teacher emigrated too. The two sisters opened their first school in Tenterfield in New South Wales in 1895.

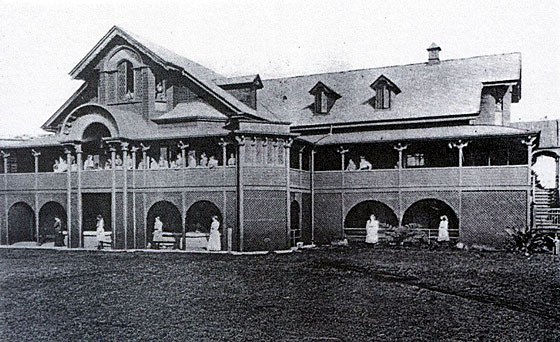
Moreton Bay College in Queensland

Brisbane's Moreton Bay College was opened in January 1901 by Alice, Helah and her sister Anne Eliza Greene, in a three-storey school wooden building designed and built by their father who was a master carpenter. Alice was the school's headteacher and they only accepted about 30 children and the majority of them were boarders. The youngest was five years old and some only saw their mothers and fathers at Christmas. The children's parents included missionaries. A small number of the children returned to their parents each night and in the early years there were a few small boys too.

New buildings, including a library, were constructed in 1910 and in 1911 her sister followed her first love which was art. She went off to study at the South Kensington Art School in London and more of Alice's sisters, Hilda and Elsie became Moreton Bay teachers. (One source says that Helah joined at this point). The school claimed to have the first Australian music school - where Hilda Green taught piano and Helah Green gave lessons on the cello and the violin.

Alice retired at the end of 1943 and she was succeeded by her sister Elsie Green who taught Maths and French. The Greene sisters decide to give the school to the Methodist church in 1945.

Her brothers Sam and John William Greene were both mayors of Wynnum and John was Mayor of Brisbane in the 1930s.

Green died in Wynnum in 1966. The Moreton Bay College was still operating in 2023.
