= Heather Joshi =

British academic, economist, and demographer

Heather Joshi CBE FBA FAcSS
- Born: Heather Evelyn Spooner; 21 April 1946 (age 80)

Academic background
- Education: St Hilda's College, Oxford; St Antony's College, Oxford

Academic work
- Discipline: Economist
- Sub-discipline: Demographic economics; longitudinal studies
- Institutions: University of Oxford; Government Economic Service; London School of Hygiene and Tropical Medicine; Birkbeck College, London; City University London

Heather Evelyn Joshi, CBE, FBA, FAcSS (née Spooner; born 21 April 1946) is a British academic, economist, and demographer. She is Emeritus Professor of Economic and Developmental Demography at the University of London. She was Director of the Centre for Longitudinal Studies from 2003 to 2010.

== Early life and education ==
Joshi was born on 21 April 1946 to Guy Malcolm Spooner and Molly Spooner; her parents were both biologists. She went to school in Devon, England. She studied politics, philosophy and economics at St Hilda's College, Oxford, graduating with a Bachelor of Arts (BA) degree in 1967: as was traditional, her BA was later promoted to a Master of Arts (MA Oxon) degree. She undertook postgraduate studies in economics at St Antony's College, Oxford, graduating with a Master of Letters (MLitt) degree in 1970.

== Academic career ==
Joshi began her career as a junior research officer at the Institute of Economics and Statistics, University of Oxford (1969 to 1973), and an economic advisor with the Government Economic Service (1973 to 1979). She then joined the Centre for Population Studies at the London School of Hygiene and Tropical Medicine (LSHTM), working as a research fellow (1979 to 1983) and senior research fellow (1983 to 1988). She moved to the Department of Economics of Birkbeck College, London, where she was a senior research fellow from 1987/1988 to 1990. She then returned to LSHTM where she had been appointed a senior lecturer.

From 1993 to 1998, she was Professor of Social Statistics at City University London. In 1994, she was appointed Deputy Director of the Centre for Longitudinal Studies. From 2000 to 2011, she was director of the United Kingdom's Millennium Cohort Study. In 2003, she was promoted to Director of the Centre for Longitudinal Studies, and served in that role until 2010. She has been a research professor at the Institute of Education of University College, London since 2016.

== Personal life ==
In 1969, she married Vijay Joshi: they divorced in 1977. In 1982, she married for a second time to Gregory Hans David Martin. Together they had two children and step children from previous marriages.

== Honours ==
In 2000, Joshi was elected Fellow of the British Academy (FBA). In the 2015 New Year Honours, she was appointed Commander of the Order of the British Empire (CBE) 'for services to Longitudinal and Women's Studies'.

== Works ==
- Joshi, Heather; Joshi, Vijay (1976). Surplus labour and the city: a study of Bombay. Delhi: Oxford University Press. ISBN 978-0195606317.
- Joshi, Heather, ed. (1989). The changing population of Britain. Oxford: Blackwell. ISBN 978-0631165156.
- Joshi, Heather; Paci, Pierella (1998). Unequal pay for women and men: evidence from the British birth cohort studies. Cambridge, Massachusetts: MIT Press. ISBN 978-0262100687.
- Davies, Hugh; Joshi, Heather (2000). The price of parenthood and the value of children. Bristol, UK: Policy Press.
- Dex, Shirley; Joshi, Heather, eds. (2005). Children of the 21st century: from birth to nine months. Bristol, UK: Policy Press. ISBN 978-1861346896.
- Scott, Jacqueline; Dex, Shirley; Joshi, Heather, eds. (2008). Women and employment changing lives and new challenges. Cheltenham, Uk: Edward Elgar Publishing. ISBN 978-1848442931.
- Hansen, Kirstine; Joshi, Heather; Dex, Shirley, eds. (2010). Children of the 21st century: the first five years. Bristol: Policy Press. ISBN 978-1847424761.
- Joshi, Heather; Jacobsen, Joyce P.; Robb, Robert Edgecombe; Burton, Jonathan; Blackaby, David H.; Humphries, Jane; Wang, Xiaobo; Dong, Xiao-yuan (July 2006). "Explorations: The Status of Women Economists". Feminist Economics. 12 (3): 427–474. doi:10.1080/13545700600669667. S2CID 154406329.
