= Sharnbrook Academy =

Location
- Odell Road; Sharnbrook, Bedfordshire, MK44 1JL; England; 52°13′24″N 0°33′26″W

Information
- Type: Academy
- Motto: Excellence, Care and Opportunity For All
- Established: c. 1975
- Local authority: Bedford Borough
- Department for Education URN: 136470 Tables
- Ofsted: Reports
- Chair of Governors: Roz Gray
- Principal: Clare Keating-Roberts (acting)
- Staff: c. 300
- Gender: Coeducational
- Age: 11 to 18
- Enrolment: 1862
- Houses: Cygnus, Phoenix, Ursa, Pegasus, Delphinus
- Colours: Yellow and grey (formerly with emerald green)
- Website: www.sharnbrook.academy

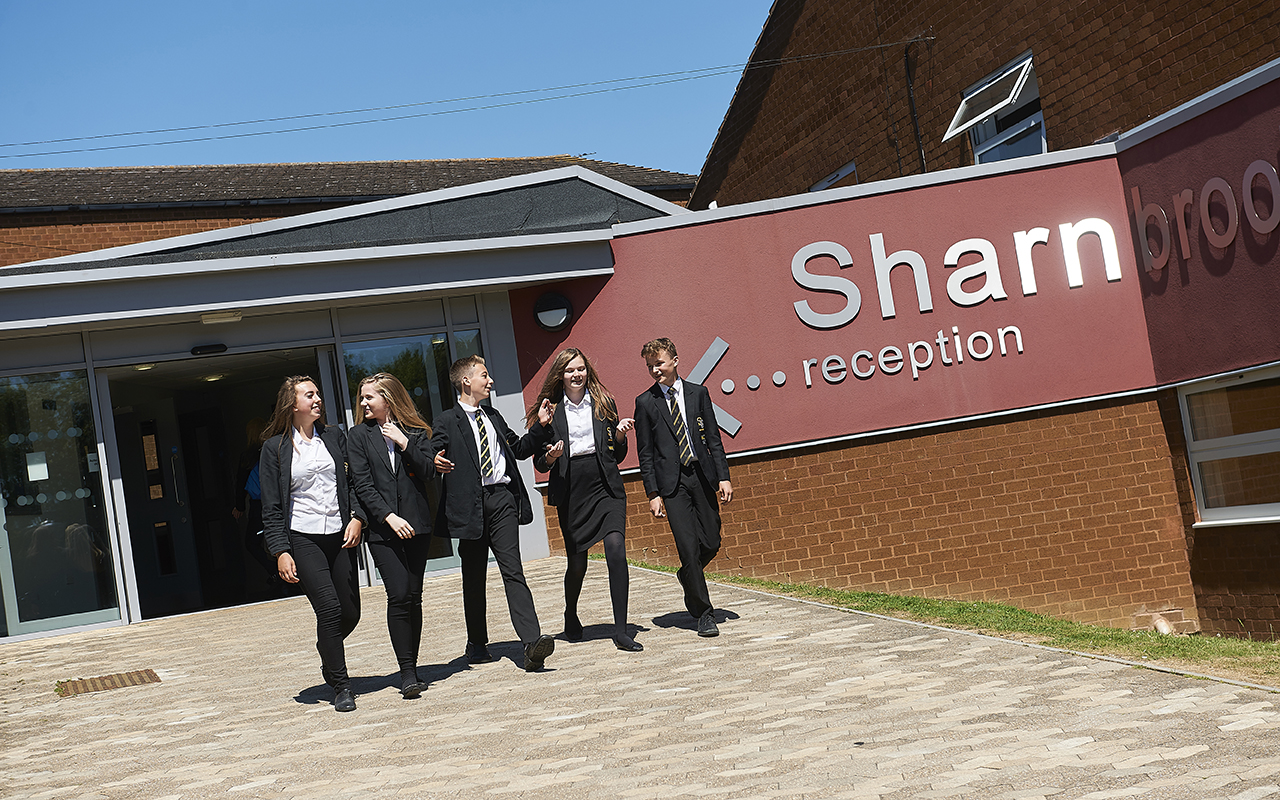
Front entrance to Sharnbrook, leading to the reception

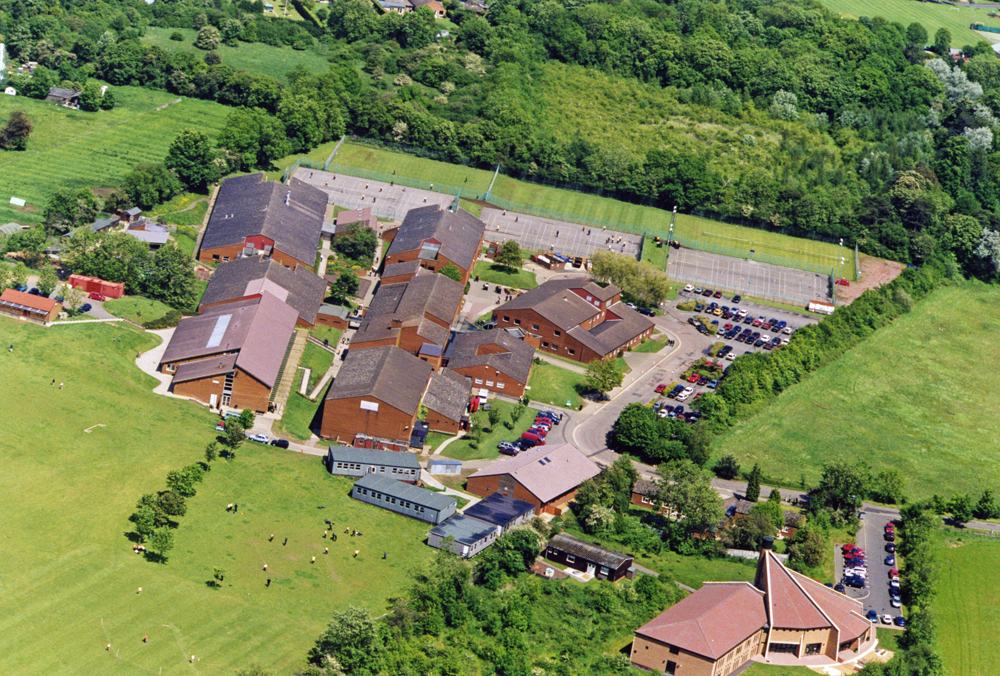
An aerial photograph from 2001-2003 (date needs checking. Both AstroTurf and housing estate next to site were built prior to 2003 and would be visible in this photo) of the school site. The Astroturf and new science centre are not visible.

Sharnbrook Academy, formerly Sharnbrook Upper School until 2017, is a large, rural academy school located in Sharnbrook, a village in the English county of Bedfordshire. Built in 1975, the school now has over 1700 students and around 300 staff, and includes a large sixth form founded in 1978 of around 650 students.

== Age range of students ==
Most students join the school in Year 7 where they are aged 11. They take GCSE exams, in year 11 (ages 15–16), after which some students will leave to attend a technical college or an alternative sixth form. Most, however, stay and join the sixth form (Years 12 and 13, ages 16–18+), where they are joined by a large number of students who have completed their GCSEs at other schools and have moved to Sharnbrook for their final two years at school.

== Vertical tutoring ==
House	Letter	Colour
Cygnus	C	green
Phoenix	Px	red
Ursa	U	orange
Pegasus	Pe	purple
Delphinus	D	blue

Beginning in the 2003 to 2004 academic year through to the 2017 to 2018 academic year, Sharnbrook introduced vertical tutoring, a pastoral system in which each tutor group has students from each year group, from Year 9 to Year 13 (Upper Sixth). This was initially stopped for Years 12 and 13 (Sixth-Form), when Sharnbrook became a secondary school. Vertical tutoring was ended completely when the COVID-19 pandemic started, as when the school returned for the 2020 to 2021 academic year, the tutor groups were split horizontally. In June 2022, a new house system was announced consisting of five new houses as well as the return of vertical tutoring for Years 7-10. Year 11 initially remained horizontal, however this was stopped beginning in the 2023-24 academic year. This was introduced at the beginning of the 2022-23 academic year. The new names are Cygnus, Delphinus, Pegasus, Phoenix, and Ursa. The previous houses were Grange, Colworth, Templar, Parentines, Loring and Ouse, named after medieval manors of Sharnbrook village.

To accommodate the new vertical tutor groups, a House system was devised, comprising six houses, one of which every student is a member. Most of the staff are also assigned to a house. Each house contains fourteen tutor groups and is led by a Head of House and an Assistant Head of House, titles which are sometimes abbreviated to HOH and AHOH, respectively. Traditional Heads of Year still exist, although their role has greatly diminished with the arrival of Heads of House. When the school went to horizontal tutoring in 2020, the houses were retained.

== Facilities ==
- Art rooms and gallery, including a photographic darkroom and a specialist digital suite.
- AstroTurf sports pitch
- Climbing wall
- Dance studio
- Interactive whiteboards
- Main Hall and Sports Hall
- Music centre, incorporating two recording studios and a large music tech room
- Paula Radcliffe Community Sports Centre
- Playing fields
- Sixth form centre, built in 1999
- Tennis courts
- Television studio, edit suites
- Drama Studios

The school hosted its own Farm onsite for many years (later an Animal Care Centre).

In late 2009 plans were confirmed for the construction of a new science centre, with construction due to begin early 2010. The centre was completed in November 2010. In 2011 there was a large project which included, but was not limited to, a new library (the Learning Hub), dining room (Dining 1) and another refurbished dining room (JDs).

== Broadcast team ==
Sharnbrook Academy Media Department offers students the role of studio hands in the "Broadcast Team". The group is responsible for the running of the school broadcast system, which replaces the traditional whole school assembly. The broadcast is filmed, live, in a special television studio and gallery, situated in the heart of the academy.

== Specialisms and academy status ==
Sharnbrook is a Training School, a Partnership Promotion School, a Beacon School and has received the Artsmark Gold and Sportsmark awards from the Arts Council England and Sport England, respectively. Previously Sharnbrook was granted specialist school status as a media Arts College.

On 1 February 2011, Sharnbrook Upper School formally gained academy status.

== Catchment area ==
The catchment area for Sharnbrook Academy includes the parishes of Bletsoe, Bolnhurst and Keysoe, Carlton and Chellington, Clapham, Dean and Shelton, Felmersham and Radwell, Harrold, Knotting and Souldrop, Little Staughton, Melchbourne and Yielden, Sharnbrook, Stevington, Milton Ernest, Oakley, Odell, Pavenham, Pertenhall, Podington, Hinwick and Farndish, Thurleigh, Turvey, Riseley, Swineshead and Wymington.

=== Trust ===
Sharnbrook Academy, along with 24 other schools, form part of the Meridian Trust (formerly Cambridge Meridian Academies Trust (CMAT)). The school formerly formed part of the Sharnbrook Academy Federation (SAF) until 2021.

== Notable former pupils ==
- Jack Collison, footballer
- Shaunagh Craig, Northern Ireland netball international
- Jane Elliott, sociologist and academic
- Oliver Gavin, racing driver
- Cal Henderson, software architect and web developer (Yahoo, Flickr, Slack Co-founder and CTO)
- Matt Jackson, professional footballer
- Sean Longden, historian
- Paula Radcliffe, marathon runner and world record holder
- Nick Tandy, racing driver
- Giles Scott, sailor and Olympian
- Alistair Strathern, Labour MP for Hitchin
