= British birth cohort studies =

Birth cohort studies in Britain are four long-term medical and social studies, carried out over the lives of a group of participants, from birth. The earliest two started in 1946 and 1958.

== Principal cohort studies ==
- National Survey of Health & Development (NSHD), established in 1946
- National Child Development Study (NCDS), established in 1958
- 1970 British Cohort Study (BCS70)
- Millennium Cohort Study (MCS), established in 2000

== Methods and outcomes ==
The studies involve repeated surveys of large numbers of individuals (typically around 17,000) from birth and throughout their lives. They have collected information on education and employment, family and parenting, physical and mental health, and social attitudes, as well as applying cognitive tests at various ages.

They are longitudinal studies that follow the same groups of people throughout their lives. As such, they enable research exploring how histories of health, wealth, education, family and employment are interwoven for individuals, vary between them and affect outcomes and achievements in later life. There have been approximately 2,500 published pieces of research worldwide using the four studies according to one source and over 6,000 papers and forty books by another source.

Comparisons between the different generations in the four cohorts enable academics to chart social change and start to untangle the reasons behind it. Findings from the studies have contributed to debates and enquiries in a number of policy areas over the last half-century including: education and equality of opportunity; poverty and social exclusion; gender differences in pay and employment; social class differences in health; changing family structures; and anti-social behaviour.

The studies were key sources of evidence for a number of UK Government inquiries, such as the Plowden Committee on Primary Education (1967), the Warnock Committee on Children with Special Educational Needs (1978), the Finer Committee on One Parent Families (1966–74), the Acheson Independent Inquiry into Inequalities in Health (1998) and the Moser Committee on Adult Basic Skills (1997–99). A study of working mothers and early child development was influential in making the argument for increased maternity leave. Another study on the impact of assets, such as savings and investments on future life chances, played a major part in the development of assets-based welfare policy, including the much-debated Child Trust Fund.

== See also ==
- Avon Longitudinal Study of Parents and Children, established 1991
- Lothian Birth Cohort Studies, established 1921
- Dunedin Multidisciplinary Health and Development Study New Zealand
