= Moreton Bay College =

Location
- Manly West, Queensland; Australia; 27°28′16″S 153°9′9″E

Information
- Type: Independent, single-sex, day school
- Motto: Latin: Fortitudine Et Spe (With Courage and Hope)
- Denomination: Uniting Church
- Established: 1901
- Chair: Samantha O’Brien
- Principal: Rebecca Lennon
- Chaplain: Peter Lockhart
- Staff: ~96
- Enrolment: ~1,260 (P–12)
- Colours: Maroon and gold, with pink often used to represent sporting teams
- Slogan
- Website: www.mbc.qld.edu.au

Moreton Bay College is an independent Uniting Church, day school for girls, located in Manly West, an outer suburb of Brisbane, Queensland, Australia. Established in 1901 as the Moreton Bay Girls' High School, by Alice J. Alison Greene and her sister Anne, the college currently caters for approximately 1,257 students from Preschool to Year 12.

Moreton Bay College is affiliated with the Association of the Heads of independent schools of Australia (AHISA), the Junior School Heads Association of Australia (JSHAA), the Alliance of Girls' Schools Australasia (AGSA), and first became a member of the Queensland Girls' Secondary Schools Sports Association (QGSSSA) in 1941. Its brother school is Moreton Bay Boys' College.

== History ==
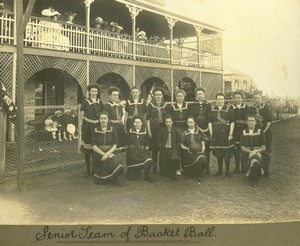
The school's basketball team in the early 1900s

Moreton Bay College was founded in 1901 by the artist Alice Jane Greene and her sister Anne Eliza Greene, in a three storey school wooden building designed and built by their father. Its location was in the heart of Wynnum town, on Bay Terrace, bounded by Charlotte and Florence Streets. The school was originally called Moreton Bay Girls' High School and was intended to provide, in addition to classrooms and other rooms, boarding facilities for thirty boarders. The first roll contained six boarders and twenty day scholars.

Alice retired in 1943. In 1944, the Greene family handed the school over to the Methodist Church and for a year and a half Elsie Greene was acting headmistress. The Methodist Church gave the school to the Presbyterian and Methodist Schools' Association to administer and they appointed Ellen Christensen in 1946 to the headship. Christensen was the headmistress from 1946 to 1949 but family illness led to her absence, during which time Miss Popple was acting principal. Eventually Millicent Drewe was appointed and was headmistress from 1950 to 1964.

By 1956 the roll was 150 with twenty-seven candidates for Junior Public Examination. Girls did not sit for Senior until 1959 when there were 167 pupils in all. In 1957, the name was changed to Moreton Bay College, to avoid confusion with the State High School system and to be more in keeping with the college names of the other PMSA schools.

The college roll in the early 1960s hovered around the 180 mark, as the facilities were strictly limited and no more could be accommodated. The site was only one and a quarter acres, so while this was a period of great expansion in numbers in the other QGSSSA girls' schools, Moreton Bay College remained a small school and found it harder to meet growing commitments in an ever-expanding QGSSSA competition. Eventually, in the early 1970s, Moreton Bay College withdrew from QGSSSA sport on the understanding that it could return when numbers increased sufficiently.

In 1965, after a period as acting head, Viola Owen-Winchester was appointed principal. From time to time there was talk of moving the school to a property at the southern end of Manly Road, but nothing came of it. The rural recession hit hard at what was essentially a boarding school with a small day component. In 1975, with the roll down to 125, the PMSA decided to close the college.

Although this decision was rescinded soon after, great damage was done. Parents withdrew their daughters, teachers left and in 1976 there were 65 girls at the school. The faith of those who remained was staunch indeed and none were stauncher than Winchester who battled, with the aid of the parents and friends, to keep the college open. Eventually, the Uniting Church assumed responsibility for the college and set up a new Board with a strong local content, under the Chairmanship of Mr John Mason. Under Letters Patent, issued in August 1979, Moreton Bay College was reconstituted. In that year the roll stood at 116.

At the beginning of 1980, following the retirement of Owen-Winchester, Mr Ken Waller was appointed headmaster, the first male principal in the college's history. The languishing boarding house, down to fifteen in 1980 and so much the core of Moreton Bay College's tradition, was closed at the end of 1980.

At the end of 1981, the college acquired 20 hectares of hillside land in Wondall Road and the Board began planning the removal of the college to the new site. It was decided to do this in two stages, with the Primary School to move first. During 1983, the Primary buildings were erected and were occupied on the first day of school in 1984. Towards the end of 1985, the Secondary School was built. The Secondary pupils began the 1986 school year on the new site.

At the close of 1998, Ken Waller retired after nineteen years of leadership of the college. In his time the college flourished, with significant growth and expansion occurring in the late 1980s and into the 1990s.

Paul Teys was appointed principal from the start of the school year in 1999. During that year the Leita Boswell Hall, a primary school sports and general performance hall, was opened and dedicated in honour of Leita Boswell (Beattie), head of primary from 1981 to 1997. The following year, a prep facility was built adjacent to the Hargreaves Road entrance to the college.

The college celebrated its centenary in 2001, with an enrolment in its 100th year of 1170 girls from Prep to Year 12. During this time, a number of changes in curriculum emerged, including TAFE and school-based traineeships, expanding the curricular offerings. In 2002, the college swim team won the much sought after QGSSSA Swimming title; the MBC Centre of Excellence in Gymnastics was established, and to complete a very good year, the Seniors of 2002 achieved the highest number and proportion of OP 1 and 2 (used for Tertiary Entry) on record.

In April 2003, the college opened its own chapel for the first time in 102 years. The chapel was formerly the Upper Brookfield Uniting Church, which closed in November 2001. MBC Child Care, a long day care centre providing full care for boys and girls from 15 months, as well as outside school hours care and vacation care, was also opened in 2003. In addition, the establishment of Moreton Bay Boys' College in collaboration with the Presbyterian and Methodist Schools Association (PMSA).

At the opening of 2004, the college roll was at record levels: 1220 across the P-12 campus. In August 2004, construction began on the music centre and concert hall. This facility was officially opened in February 2006, and significantly enhanced the college's Music Program.

In March 2005, Mr Teys completed his tenure at the college. Mr McLay (deputy principal) acted as principal for the remainder of the year, during which time the board of governors appointed Ms Jennifer Haynes as principal from the commencement of 2006.

In 2007, Moreton Bay College won both the Mollie Gould Cup for Swimming and the Stephens Trophy for Athletics for the first time in MBC history. This feat was repeated in 2008. In 2009, Moreton Bay College swimmers lived up to their reputation by taking out the Mollie Gould Cup for the fifth consecutive year, totally an impressive seven times over the past eight years.

The graduates of 2006 and 2007 achieved outstanding results, which saw MBC described as ‘the most successful of the state’s all-girls schools”. In 2008, the results of the graduating class saw MBC earn the title of “Queensland’s No. 1 Academic Achiever for 2008” by The Courier-Mail. While Moreton Bay Boys’ College remained fully independent of MBC in its management, in 2008, Moreton Bay College assumed full financial responsibility for the college.

Through inclusive consultation, a renewed strategic plan 2009–2013 was released in 2008.

In July 2011, Moreton Bay College and Moreton Bay Boys’ College amalgamated.

The two Colleges were constitutionally joined by a common Board membership, under the leadership of chair of the board, Mr Geoff Diehm. Ms Jennifer Haynes was appointed as principal of both schools with focus being on developing alignment as appropriate across the two schools, strategic development, staff employment and financial oversight with the assistance of the cross schools' Director of Business and Finance, Helen Gabriel.

In 2012, Dr. Deborah Priest was appointed as the inaugural head of college at Moreton Bay College to oversee its daily operations and implementation of the budget and to feed into the strategic planning of the college.

Current enrolments for 2013 are at approximately 1200 students.

== Curriculum ==
The school's curriculum for Years Prep to 12, is based around eight main Learning Areas: English, Mathematics, Science, SOSE, Languages, Technology, Personal Development, and the Arts. In the Senior Years, students are offered more choice, with 25 Authority subjects, four Authority-Registered subjects and Externally based Vocational courses, and a Personal Development program.

== House system ==
Moreton Bay College currently has four houses:

- Wesley House (1946–present) named after John Wesley; House colours: blue and gold
- Whitfield House (1946–present) named after George Whitefield; House colours: green and gold
- Alison Greene House (1959–1976, 1984–present) named after college founder Alice J. Alison Greene; House colours: white and gold
- Drewe House (1984–present) named after former headmistress Millicent Drewe; House colours: black and gold

== Notable alumnae ==
- Quentin Bryce AC — former Governor of Queensland and former Governor-General-designate of Australia
- Miela Goodchild — basketball player
- Naazmi Johnston — rhythmic gymnast, Bronze-medalist Commonwealth Games, Beijing Olympic Team member, placed 22nd Gold Medal Commonwealth Games, New Delhi 2010
- Larrissa Miller — artistic gymnast, dual Silver-medalist, Commonwealth Games at Glasgow 2014, Rio Olympics qualifier 2016
- Shannon Parry — rugby union player; Rio Olympian 2016
- Danielle Prince — rhythmic gymnast, Rio Olympian 2016 Commonwealth Games
- Jaime Ryan — sailor; Rio Olympian 2016
- Chloe Sims — artistic gymnast, Commonwealth Dual Gold medalist
- Megan Washington — musician, Best Female Artist and Breakthrough Artist, Aria Awards, Australia 2010
- Anika Wells — federal MP

== See also ==
- List of schools in Queensland
