= Sisterhood method =

Survey estimating maternal deaths

The Sisterhood Method is a household survey to estimate maternal deaths recommended by the World Health Organization (WHO). Although maternal deaths are a major problem in developing countries, high quality data are rare. Yet, numbers are needed for planning in order to reduce the problem of maternal death. Several methods have been used to estimate maternal deaths. According to the WHO, "The approach was designed to overcome the problem of large sample sizes and thus reduce cost."

== Background ==
The death of a woman during or shortly after a pregnancy is an important medical problem in developing countries. 99% of all maternal deaths occur in developing countries. In the poorest countries in the world, e.g. Sierra Leone, the lifetime risk for a woman dying because of a maternal death is approx 1 in 6, whereas in developed countries, e.g. Sweden, the same lifetime risk is approx 1 in 30,000. Half of all maternal deaths occur in six countries only: Afghanistan, Democratic Republic of Congo, Ethiopia, India, Nigeria, and Pakistan. Worldwide, maternal deaths decreased from approx 500,000 in 1980 to approx 350,000 in 2008. This decline in maternal deaths was associated mainly with better maternal education, maternal income, increased availability of trained birth attendants, and decreased pregnancy rates.

== Estimating maternal deaths ==
Although maternal deaths are a major problem in developing countries, seen globally, the numbers are not very large, and there is an absence of high quality data. Yet, numbers are needed for planning in order to reduce maternal deaths. Several methods have been used to estimate maternal deaths. They include analysing census records and medical/death certificates, and Reproductive Age Mortality Studies (RAMOS). Also, household surveys are used. All of these methods are not totally precise, but they can provide some useful information to decrease maternal mortality.

In contrast, full surveillance programmes would be too costly and too unrealistic for many developing countries.

== Sisterhood Method ==
The Sisterhood Method is the most common household survey for estimating maternal deaths. It is time- and cost-effective, and reduces sample size requirements; in countries or areas with high levels of maternal deaths, i.e. over 500 maternal deaths per 100,000 live births, a sample size of 4000 households or less is acceptable for this method. But the method still provides a useful means of assessing maternal mortality.

This method includes four questions about the sisters of the woman in question:

- How many sisters have you ever had, born to the same mother, who ever reached the age 15 (or who were ever married), including those who are now dead?
- How many of your sisters who reached the age of 15 are alive now?
- How many of these sisters are dead?
- How many of your sisters who are dead died during a pregnancy or during childbirth, or during the six weeks after the end of a pregnancy?

== Application ==
Deaths occurring over a large interval of time are documented. The overall estimate of maternal mortality is determined for 10–12 years before the survey. The Sisterhood Method is useful because usually maternal mortality changes slowly. It provides some meaningful data in countries or areas where there are no alternative means of generating estimates.

== When should the Sisterhood Method not be used ==
The Sisterhood Method is not appropriate in countries or areas where the total fertility rate is less than four children per family, in areas of significant migration, as well as during civil war, civil unrest or other significant social disruption.

== Variant ==
The original Sisterhood Method is an indirect method. The newer Direct Sisterhood Method targets a more limited reference period for sister deaths and uses more in depth questions (e.g., deaths among all siblings, all deaths that are pregnancy related, and when these deaths occurred). This variant relies on fewer assumptions than the original Sisterhood Method. However, it requires a larger sample size, data gathering and analysis are more complex, and has large confidence intervals. Despite these limitations, the Direct Sisterhood Method can result in greater specificity of information. A retrospective maternal mortality ratio (MMR) can be calculated. This variant is used by Demographic and Health Surveys (DHS).
