= Journal of Epidemiology and Community Health =

- Discipline: Public health, epidemiology
- Language: English
- Edited by: Vittal Katikireddi and Anna Pearce

Publication details
- Former names: British Journal of Social Medicine, British Journal of Preventive and Social Medicine, Epidemiology and Community Health
- History: 1947-present
- Publisher: BMJ Group
- Frequency: Monthly
- Impact factor: 3.4 (2025)

Standard abbreviations
- ISO 4: J. Epidemiol. Community Health

Indexing
- CODEN: JECHDR
- ISSN: 0143-005X (print); 1470-2738 (web)
- OCLC no.: 05385322
- British Journal of Social Medicine
- ISSN: 0366-0842
- British Journal of Preventive and Social Medicine
- ISSN: 0007-1242
- Epidemiology and Community Health
- ISSN: 0142-467X

Links
- Journal homepage; Online access; Online archive

The Journal of Epidemiology and Community Health is a monthly peer-reviewed public health journal that covers all aspects of epidemiology and public health. It is published by the BMJ Group.

== History ==
The journal was established in 1947 by John Ryle, "one of the most distinguished figures in contemporary medicine". It has been published under various titles:

- 1947–1952: British Journal of Social Medicine
- 1953–1977: British Journal of Preventive and Social Medicine
- 1978: Journal of Epidemiology and Community Health
- March 1979: Epidemiology and Community Health
- June 1979–present: Journal of Epidemiology and Community Health

== Abstracting and indexing ==
The journal is abstracted and indexed by MEDLINE/PubMed and Current Contents. The journal has a 2023 impact factor of 4.9.
