= National Survey of Health & Development =

The National Survey of Health & Development is a Medical Research Council (MRC) longitudinal survey of people born in Britain in March 1946. It is "the longest continually running major birth cohort study in the world and is one of the longest-running studies of human development. "

== History ==
The 1946 birth cohort study (which became known later as National Survey of Health & Development) was set up by J. W. B. Douglas less than a year after the end of the second world war. The original promoters of this survey had been the Population Investigation Committee with help from the Royal College of Obstetricians and some funding from the Nuffield Foundation and the National Birthday Trust Fund. The survey began with interviews of 13 687 mothers who had given birth in the England, Wales and Scotland during a week in March 1946 (91% of births that week). Originally this survey was intended as a one-off project and was designed to answer questions such as;why had the national fertility rate in Britain been consistently dropping?; were the costs of giving birth a deterrent to having children?; and how well were the existing midwifery and obstetric medical services in Britain working?

Unknown to the project initiators, this project coincided with the start of the post-World War II baby boom so the question of low fertility rates was not explored. The initial results showed enormous differences in birth outcomes between different classes in Britain - for example, the babies from mothers in the lowest social class were 70% more likely to be born dead than in the highest social class. The results from this survey influenced the decisions made when setting up the British National Health Service in 1948. The survey continued with a sample (which excluded illegitimate children and twins) of 5 362 of the children using regular follow-ups to explore the impact of a National Health Service on health and to explore differences in child development by factors like social class, health and education. As of 2016 it has continued and has itself developed into a study of ageing. The regularly updated information about this cohort also enables comparison with data from other longitudinal studies in Britain and elsewhere.

The mission of the Unit is to realise the scientific potential of the NSHD as a world class, interdisciplinary life course study by:

- Scientific discovery of life course influences on normal and healthy ageing
- Transfer of knowledge to policymakers, health practitioners, and other research users
- Promotion of healthy ageing

The NSHD was formerly based at the London School of Economics (under the direction of Dr. James W. B. Douglas and at the University of Bristol), and then the Department of Epidemiology and Public Health at University College London (under the direction of Professor Michael Wadsworth). In 2016, the survey was operating under the MRC Unit for Lifelong Health and Ageing (which was established in 2008) and based in Bloomsbury, London, England, directed by Professor Diana Kuh.

Members of the 1946 birth cohort held 65th and 70th birthday party celebrations in 2011 and 2016.

== Directors ==
- 1946–1981: Dr. James W. B. Douglas
- 1982–2006: Professor Michael Wadsworth
- 2007–2017: Professor Diana Kuh
- 2017–present: Professor Nishi Chaturvedi

== Bibliography ==
Pearson, Helen (2016). The Life Project. UK: Allan Lane and imprint of Penguin Books. p. 399. ISBN 978-1-84614-826-2.

Wedge, Peter; Prosser, Hilary (1973). Born to Fail?. UK: Arrow Books Ltd. p. 64. ISBN 978-0-09-908280-4.
