= Population reconstruction =

Method used by historical demographers

Population reconstruction is a method used by historical demographers. Using records, such as church registries, the size and composition of families living in a given region in a given past time is determined. This allows the identification and analysis of patterns of family formation, fertility, mortality, and migration, and of consequent trends such as population growth.

== See also ==
- One-place study
