= 1970 British Cohort Study =

The 1970 British Cohort Study (BCS70) is a continuing, multi-disciplinary longitudinal survey monitoring the development of babies born in the UK during the week of 5–11 April 1970.

== History ==
Since the start of the BCS70, eight full sets of data have been collected in 1970, 1975, 1980, 1986, 1996, 1999/2000, 2004/2005 and 2012. The following survey was planned for 2016/2017.

The first wave in 1970, called the British Births Survey, was conducted by the National Birthday Trust Fund together with the Royal College of Obstetricians and Gynaecologists in order to collect information to compare with those of the National Child Development Study (NCDS). The following two sweeps in 1975 and 1980, when the study was known as the Child Health and Education Study (CHES), were carried out by the Department of Child Health at Bristol University. The 1986 survey was conducted by the International Centre for Child Studies and called Youthscan which was then taken over for the following surveys by the Social Statistics Research Unit (SSRU), now known as the Centre for Longitudinal Studies (CLS) By 2016 there were 770 papers and books published about the 1970 British Cohort Study.

The scope of the BCS70 has been broadened in the course of the different surveys. While the focus was on medical aspects at birth, factors such as physical, educational, social and economic development were subsequently taken into account.

Members of the 1970 birth cohort study created a Facebook page for themselves.

== Methodology and scope ==
The primary method of data collection consists of face-to-face interviews (with the parents), self-completion questionnaires and psychological and educational measurements. The sample size included 17,287 babies in England, Scotland, Wales and Northern Ireland born in 1970.

== Survey results ==
The findings from the BCS70 have generated over 770 publications. One key publication which also includes data of other British Cohort Studies is Elsa Ferri, John Bynner and Michael Wadsworth (eds.)(2003) Changing Britain, Changing Lives: three generations at the turn of the century

== Re-using the data ==
The data and additional study information are available on the website of the UK Data Service.

== See also ==
- Up Series
- Dunedin Multidisciplinary Health and Development Study

== Bibliography ==
Pearson, Helen (2016). The Life Project. UK: Allan Lane and imprint of Penguin Books. p. 19. ISBN 978-1-846-14826-2.
