= Millennium Cohort Study (United Kingdom) =

The Millennium Cohort Study (MCS) is a longitudinal survey conducted by the Centre for Longitudinal Studies (CLS) at the University of London, following the lives of a sample of about 18,818 babies born in the UK in the year 2000–2001. It is also known as Child of the New Century.

== History ==
The MCS is the fourth longitudinal birth cohort study conducted in the UK. Its aim is to create a multi-purpose data-set that describes the diversity of backgrounds into which children are born in the beginning of the 21st century. The information collected includes topics such as child development, social stratification and family life in order to identify possible advantages and disadvantages that the children are facing.

The survey is conducted in different sweeps with the first one concentrating on the circumstances of the pregnancy and birth as well as the first few months of life. This first part of the survey is also important to record the socio-economic background of the family into which the child is born. The second sweep took place when the children were about 3 years of age and the main focus was on continuity and change in the family as well as the parenting environment to extract information about the child’s development. In the third sweep in 2006, the children were at the age of starting primary school. The fourth sweep took place in 2008, the fifth was in 2012 and the sixth in 2015. The following sweep was planned for 2018.

The MCS is funded mainly by the Economic and Social Research Council (ESRC) and various government departments, such as the Department for Children, Schools and Families, the Department of Health (United Kingdom) (DH) and the Department for Work and Pensions (DfWP). The Scottish Government, the Welsh Assembly Government and the Northern Ireland Executive have also contributed to fund the survey.

Heather Joshi was director of the survey from 2000 to 2011. Emla Fitzsimons was the director from 2013.

== Methodology and scope ==
The sample is structured by geographical clusters, allowing certain areas with significant ethnic minorities (in England), high levels of child poverty, as well as Scotland, Wales and Northern Ireland to be overrepresented.

== Survey results ==
By 2016 the MCS findings have already been included in over 700 journal articles, books, etc.

== Bibliography ==
Pearson, Helen (2016). The Life Project. UK: Allan Lane and imprint of Penguin Books. p. 19. ISBN 978-1-846-14826-2.
