= National Child Development Study =

Active longitudinal study in Great Britain

The National Child Development Study (NCDS) is a continuing, multi-disciplinary longitudinal study which follows the lives of 17,415 people born in England, Scotland and Wales from 17,205 women during the week of 3–9 March 1958. The results from this study helped reduce infant mortality and were instrumental in improving maternity services in the UK.

== History ==
The origins of the NCDS can be found in the Perinatal Mortality Survey (PMS) which was then sponsored by the National Birthday Trust Fund and set up to collect information about the social and obstetric factors associated with stillbirth and death in early infancy.

The NCDS was first led by the paediatrician Neville Butler assisted by the National Birthday Trust Fund. The survey was initially planned as a one-off study to investigate the reasons for the relatively high rate of stillbirths (38.5 stillbirths per 1,000 births) in the UK compared to other developed countries. 98% of women (17,205) who gave birth in England, Scotland and Wales to 17,415 babies during the week of 3–9 March 1958 completed the survey. Records of birth deaths to 7,618 women and about 5,000 autopsy reports were also collected over the period of March–May 1958.

In 1963 the Plowden Committee which was investigating the education of primary children in the UK and the transition to secondary school, commissioned a follow-up report on the children from the NCDS. This follow-up survey was led by Mia Kellmer Pringle and attempts were made to trace all members of this birth generational cohort. The survey took place in 1965 and results were included in the Plowden report Children and their Primary Schools in 1967.

By 2016 the NCDS has been conducted in nine different sweeps to get information concerning the physical, educational and social development of the people from the initial survey: in 1965, 1969, 1974, 1981, 1991, 1999–2000, 2004, 2008 and 2014. The following sweep was planned for 2018. Examples of topics which have been included are medical care, health, home environment, educational progress, parental involvement, family relationships, economic activity, income, training and housing. During the period 2002–2004, genetic information on participants was also obtained to examine the genetic effects on common traits and diseases.

Following the initial birth survey, the four subsequent sweeps were carried out by the National Children's Bureau. In 1985, the NCDS was moved to the Social Statistics Research Unit (SSRU), which in 2016 was known as the Centre for Longitudinal Studies (CLS).

== Methodology and scope ==
In the 2013–2014 sweep data collection involved a sequential mixed mode approach whereby cohort members were invited to complete a web survey and those not responding were invited to participate via telephone. More than 9,100 cohort members took part in total, with 60% doing so on-line.

== Survey results ==
As of 2016, the results of the NCDS have been used in over 2,500 publications, some of which can be found here. The report Now we are 50 with the key findings of the NCDS was published by the CLS on the occasion of the 50th anniversary of the NCDS in 2008.

== Re-using the data ==
The data and additional study information are available on the United Kingdom Data Service (UKDS) website. Users are required to register in order to access the download section.

== Bibliography ==
- Pearson, Helen (2016). The Life Project. UK: Allan Lane and imprint of Penguin Books. p. 399. ISBN 978-1-846-14826-2.
- Wedge, Peter; Prosser, Hilary (1973). Born to Fail?. UK: Arrow Books Ltd. p. 64. ISBN 978-0099082804.
