= 3D printer cabinet =

Enclosure for a 3D printer

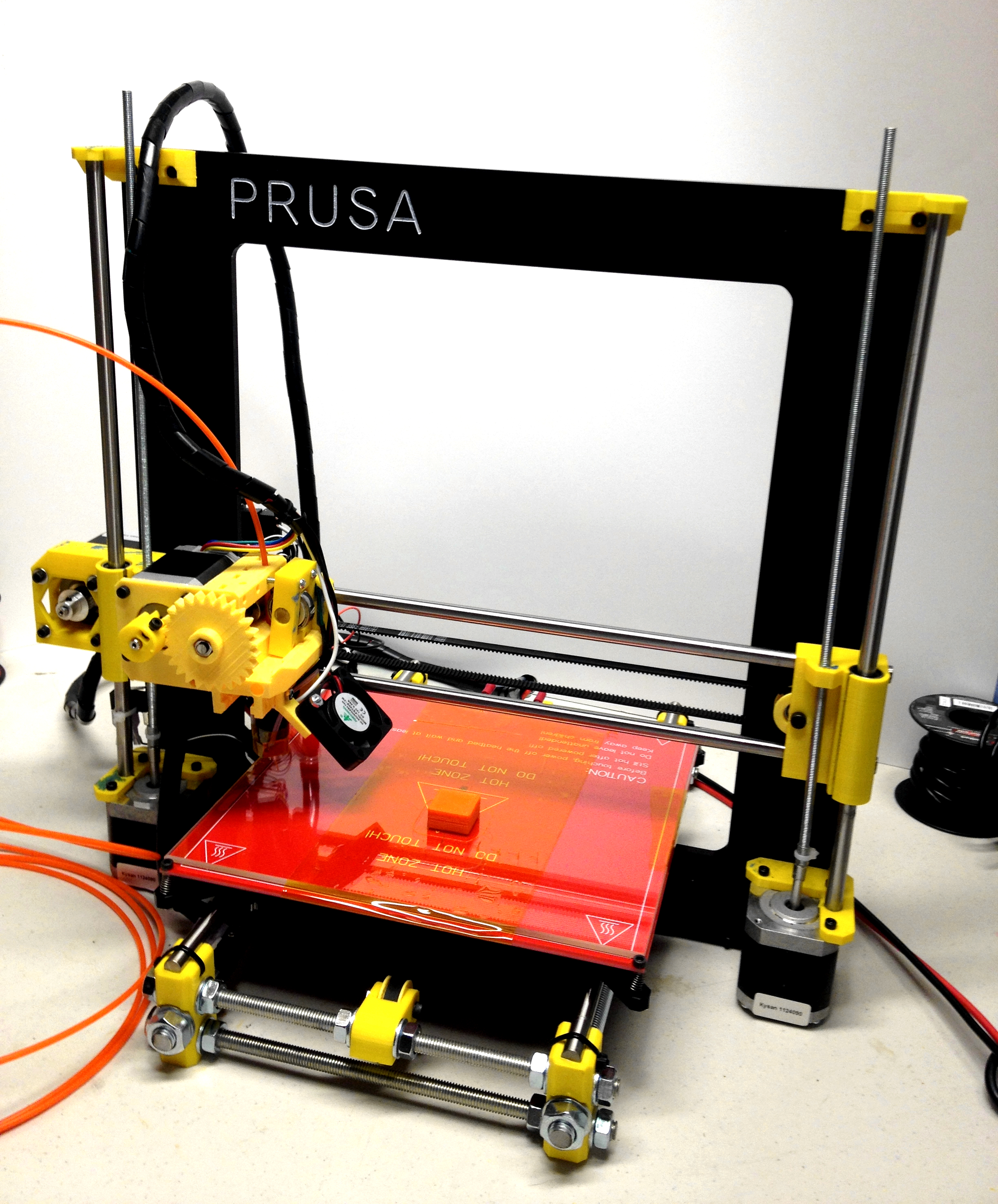
Prusa i3 (2012 and later) with open chamber, must be used with an enclosure to print with certain filament types

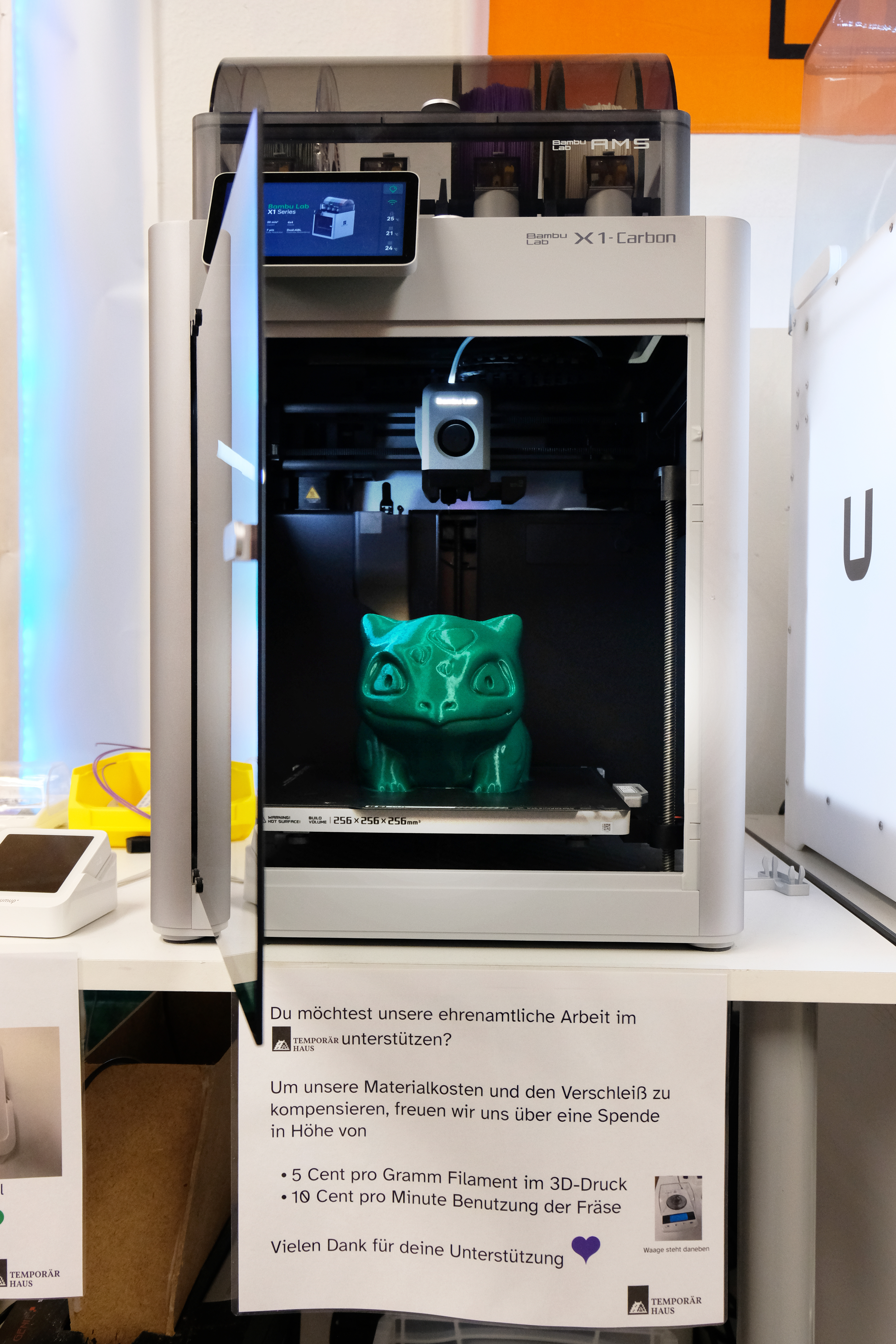
Bambu Lab X1 Carbon (2022) with a closed chamber that can print multiple types of high-temperature filament

A 3D printer cabinet or 3D printer enclosure is an enclosure used to encase 3D printers. Enclosures are often used to improve the printed part’s quality and safety by insulating the environment the printer is in.

3D printer enclosures can prevent the spread of volatile organic compounds, particulate matter, dust and odors generated during printing, as well as provide vibration isolation and sound isolation, and protect users from touching moving or heated parts of the printer.

The enclosure can be either a separate part from the printer, such as box, cabinet, cover, or tent; or be an integrated part of the printer, with such printers referred to as closed chamber printers.

== Printer technologies ==
Printer enclosures are relevant additions for all types of 3D printer technologies. In the consumer market, enclosures are most closely associated with stereolithography (SLA) resin printers that need protection from ultraviolet radiation, and with some fused-filament fabrication (FFF) printers where encasement is recommended for printing high-temperature filaments like ABS.

In industry, enclosures are very relevant for powder-based printing technologies, such as multi-jet fusion (MJF) and selective laser sintering (SLS), for dust and particulate matter control. Additional dedicated enclosures are used in post-processing to remove powder from 3D-printed parts using compressed air.

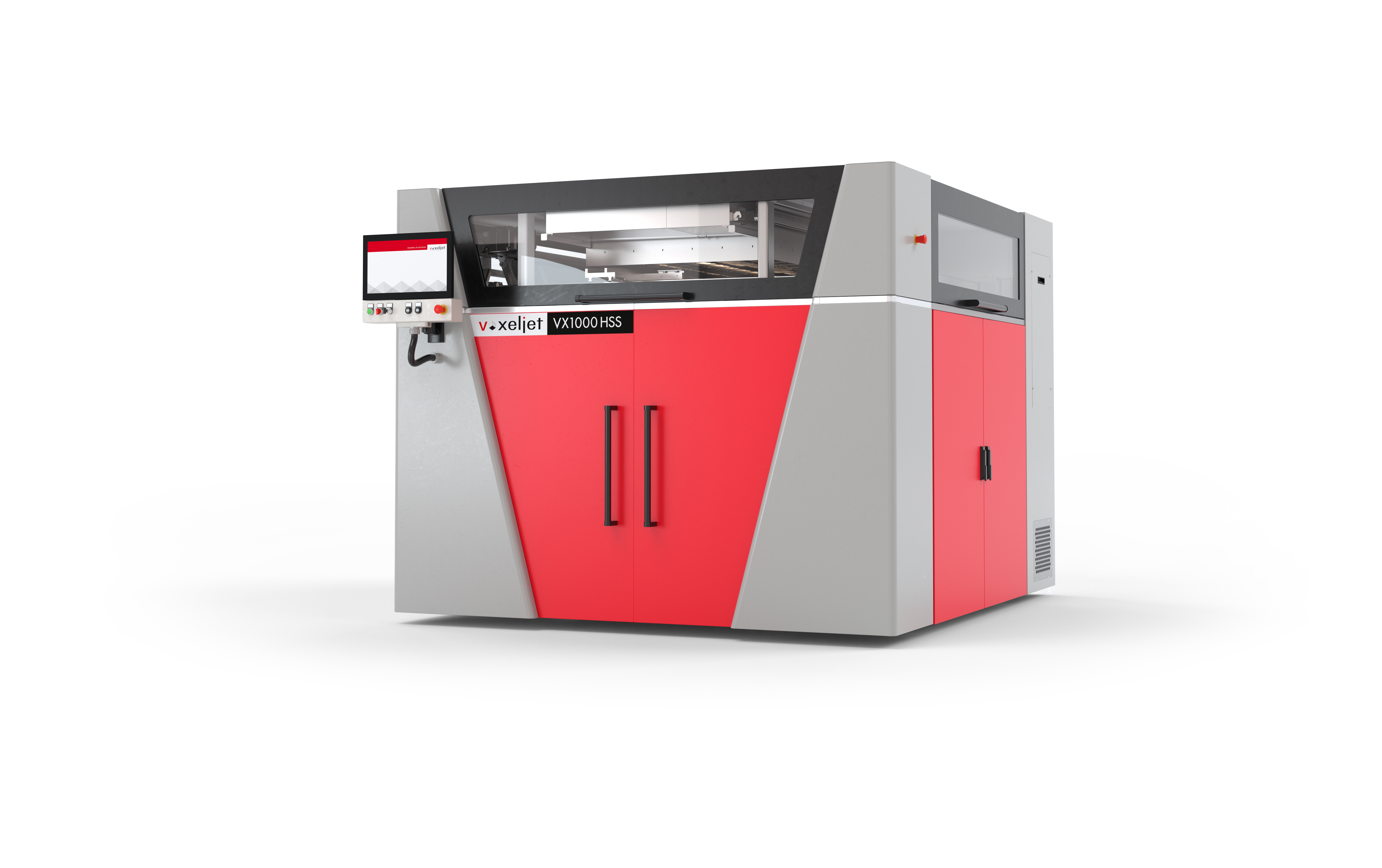
The cabinet of an industrial 3D printer for polymer sintering

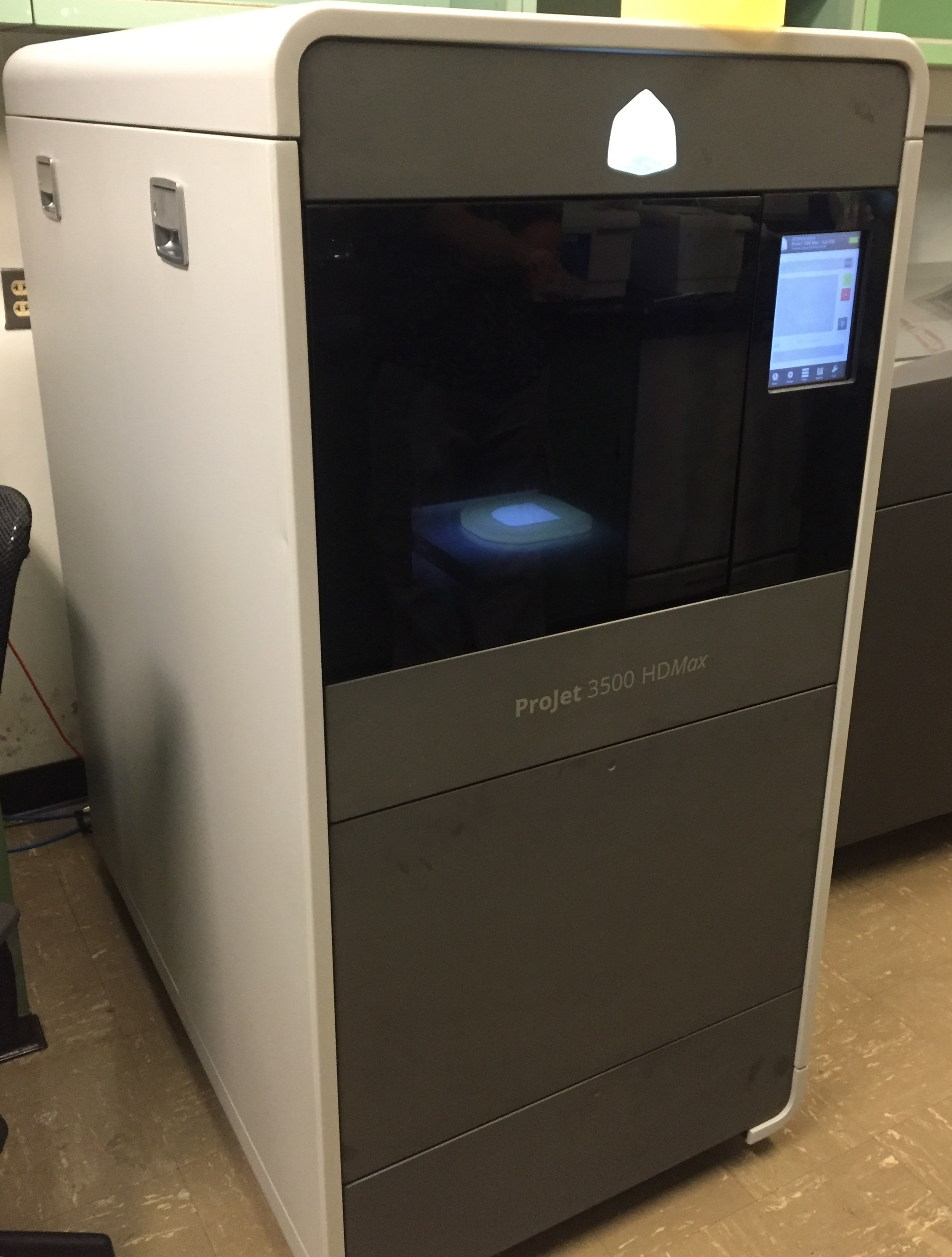
A Projet 3500 HDMax multi-jet fusion 3D printer

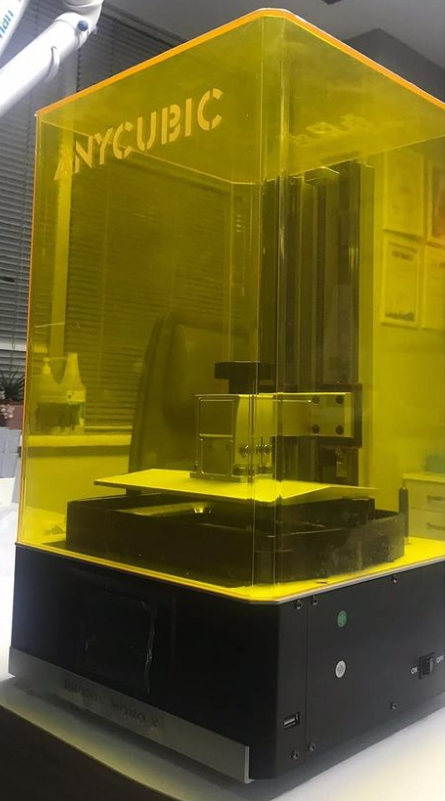
Cabinet of a resinprinter

== Uses ==
=== VOC and particulate matter management ===
3D printer usagee can have negative effects on health and safety, due to dust and harmful emissions created during printing. 3D printers are a major source of volatile organic compounds (VOCs) and particulate matter, including ultra-fine particles; these compounds are usually generated during the offgassing of heated plastic filaments in fused-filament printers, or curing of resins in stereolithography printers.

A 2023 technical study from the UL Research Institutes measured over 400 different types of VOCs, including some classified as irritatants, asthmagens, andcarcinogens.

Various enclosures feature options for connecting the enclosure to an exhaust or ventilation and filtration system, which can be used to vent the contaminated air into the atmosphere or through filters to trap the compounds before circulating or venting the air.

=== Thermal management ===
Printer cabinets can have an effect on the print quality by thermally insulating the workbench. In general, it is beneficial to maintain a consistent temperature to prevent warping or poor quality of the workpiece.

The temperature to which fused-filament printers heat their filament depends on the type of plastic used in the filament, and as such the temperature of air surrounding the workpiece can affect the properties of the plastic; PLA filaments are recommended to be printed around room temperature (~20-30°C), while ABS filaments are recommended around 60-70°C. Higher or lower temperatures can cause heat creep, clogged nozzles due to burnt plastic, string formation, blobs, poorer details and weaker parts.

Enclosures can also isolate the printer’s electronic components, such as the power supply, motors, and controller electronics from the heated chamber to increase their lifespan, by mitigating overheating and reducing the amount of thermal stress each component is exposed to.

Feeding cold air into a warm chamber can be problematic in that it creates a cool draft. If the chamber has ventilation, it can be an advantage to have roughly the same air pressure inside and outside and some form of heat recovery to avoid cold drafts.

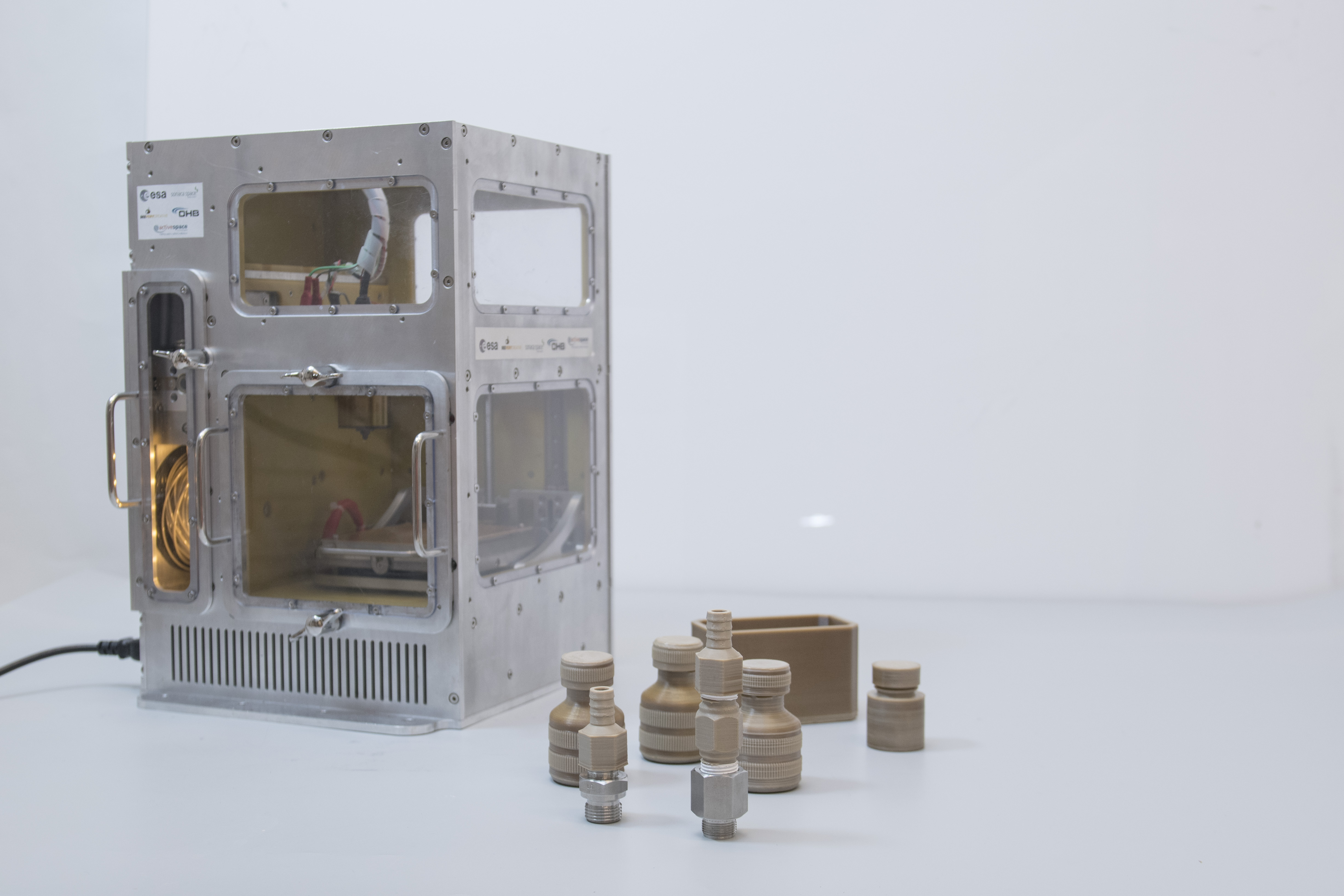
ESA's Manufacturing of Experimental Layer Technology (MELT) 3D printer can print polyether ether ketone (PEEK)

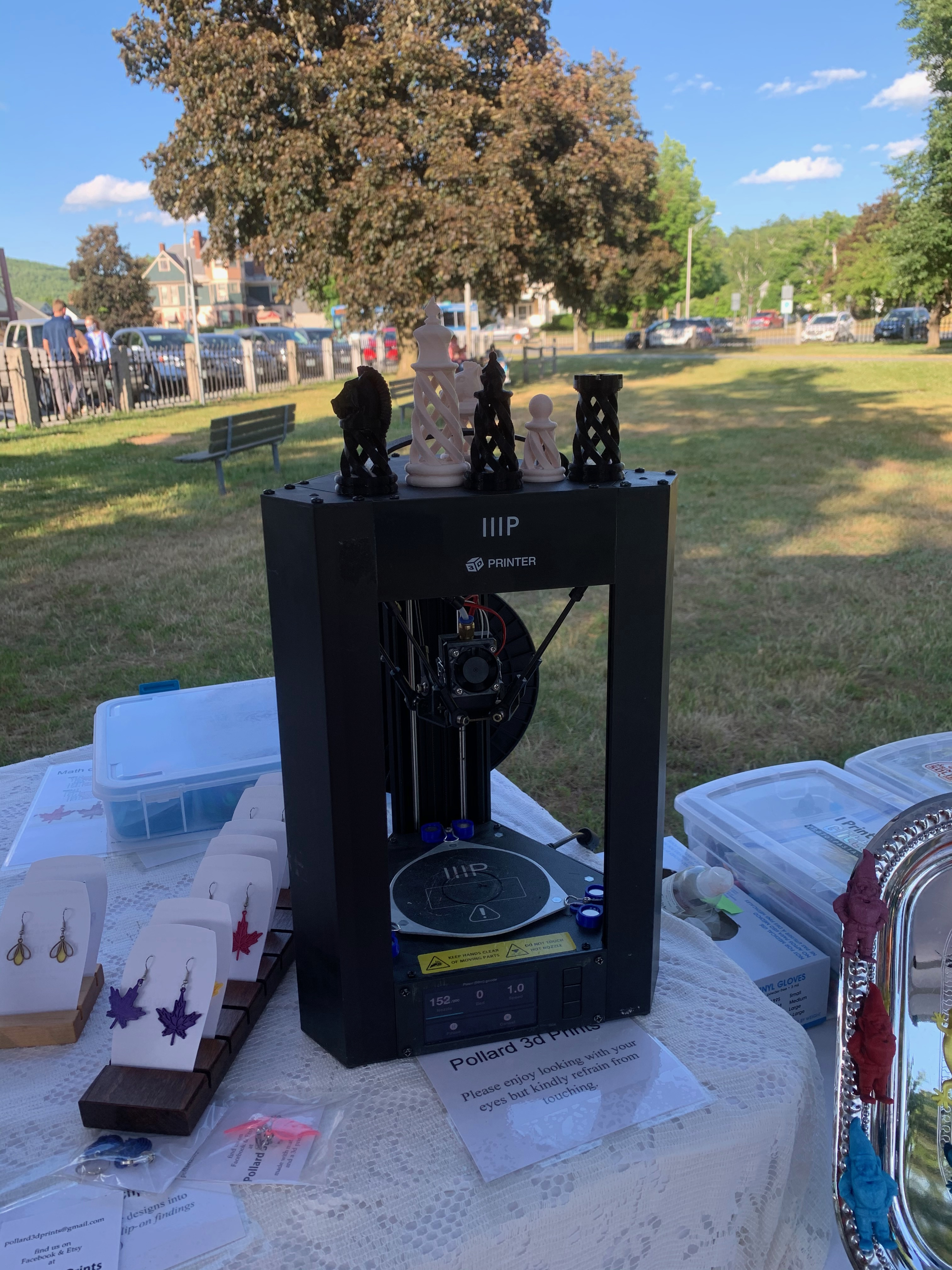
Printing outdoors can be challenging due to wind, temperature and humidity

=== Dust management ===
It is optimal to keep dust out of 3D printers, so that the workpiece does not detach from the print bed or become impregnated with dust particles, and to prevent damage to the printer’s bearings. Enclosures can protect the printer’s workbench and internal components from dust in the environment.

=== Fire hazard management ===
To reduce the risk of fire, it is important that printers placed in a chamber do not overheat, and it is beneficial for the printer to have electronics with active cooling. The frame of the cabinet can be made of aluminum profiles or fire-retardant materials. Some recommend installing smoke detectors and fire extinguishers near 3D printers, while advanced cabinets can be equipped with automatic fire suppression.

== Cabinet types ==
Cabinets are available both as assembled aftermarket products and kits, or completely homemade (including several designs based on IKEA Lack). Enclosures often feature transparent acrylic glass or plexiglass panels, and can have ports or vents for drying or storing filament, as well as storing tools related to 3D printing. Cabinets can also feature thermometers and hygrometers for automatic temperature control and ventilation control, as well as measuring air pollution.

== See also ==
- Fume hood, exhaust ventilation device using negative pressure to prevent users from being exposed to hazardous fumes, vapors and dusts
- Fused filament fabrication, type of 3D printer that melts thermoplastic material
- Health and safety hazards of 3D printing, hazards of 3D printing
- Stereolithography, photochemical 3D printing, usually with a UV laser to cure photopolymerizable resin
