= Marie Anne Lenormand =

French bookseller, necromancer, fortune-teller and cartomancer

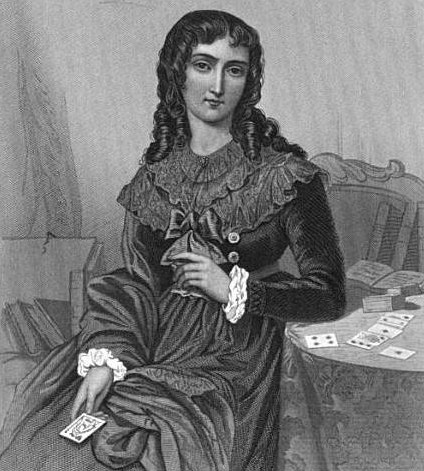
- Born: Marie Anne Adelaide Lenormand; 27 May 1772; Alençon, Normandy, France
- Died: 25 June 1843 (aged 71); Paris, Île-de-France, France
- Occupations: bookseller, necromancer, fortune-teller and cartomancer

Marie Anne Adélaïde Lenormand (1772–1843), also known as Marie Anne Le Normand, was a French bookseller, necromancer, fortune-teller and cartomancer of considerable fame during the Napoleonic era. Lenormand was highly influential on the wave of French cartomancy that began in the late 18th century.

== Early life ==
Lenormand was born on 27 May 1772 in Alençon, Normandy, to Jean Louis Antoine Lenormand, a draper, and Marie Anne Lenormand (née Gilbert). Lenormand was orphaned at the age of five and educated in a convent school. Lenormand left Alençon for Paris in 1786. At the age of 17, Lenormand was in Paris for the Storming of the Bastille which occurred on July 14, 1789.

== Career ==
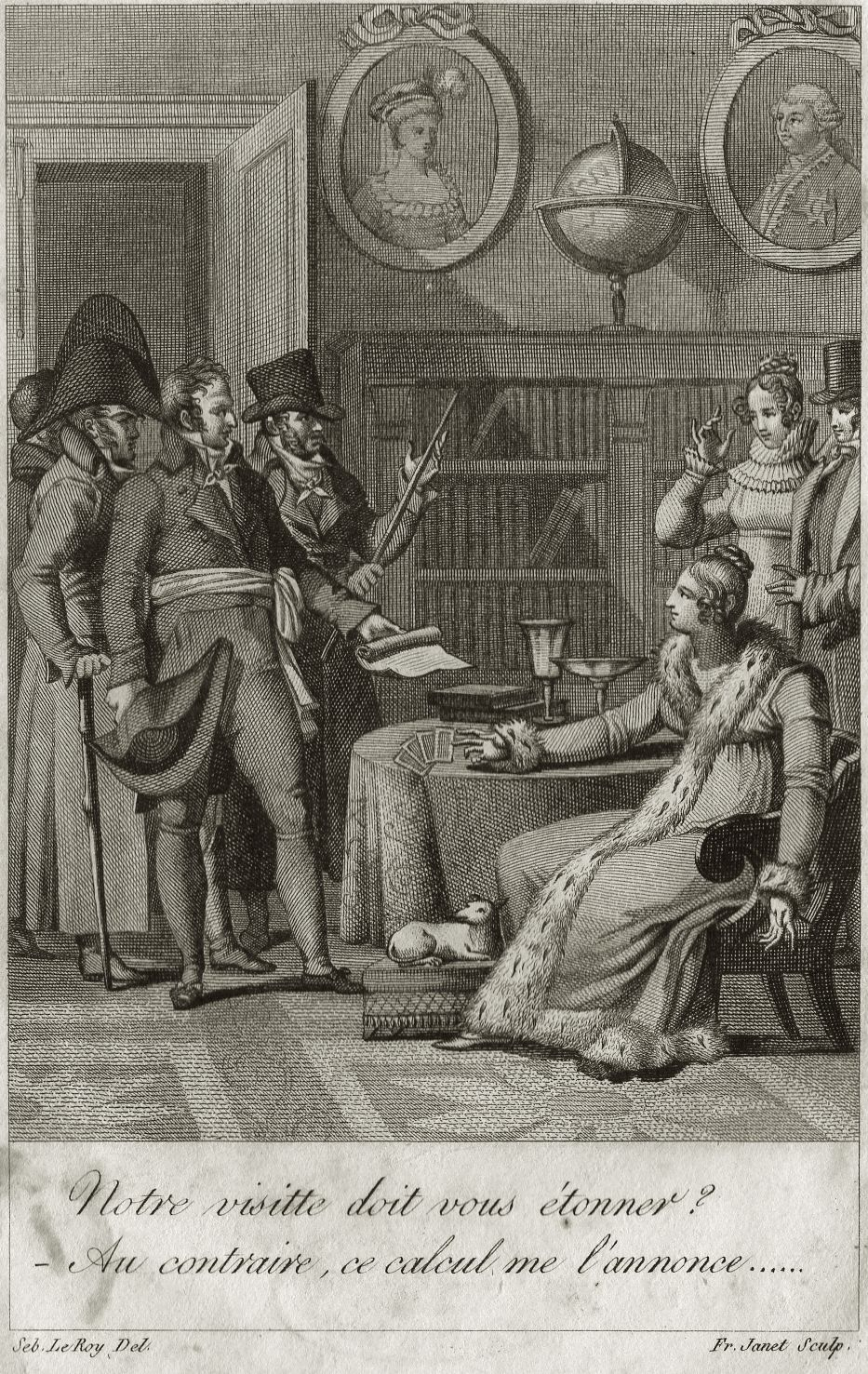
Arrest engraving of Marie-Anne Lenormand from the book frontispiece of Les Souvenirs prophétiques d'une sibylle sur les causes secrètes de son arrestation (The Prophetic Memories of a Sibyl on the Secret Causes of Her Arrest), Paris, 11 December 1809, by Mademoiselle Marie Anne Le Normand.

Lenormand claimed to have given cartomantic advice to many famous persons, among them leaders of the French Revolution (Marat, Robespierre and St-Just), Empress Josephine and Tsar Alexander I. She was active for more than 40 years.

In 1814 Lenormand started a second literary career and published many texts, causing many public controversies, such as her publication of Empress Josephine's memoirs eight years after her death. She was imprisoned more than once, though never for very long.

== Death ==
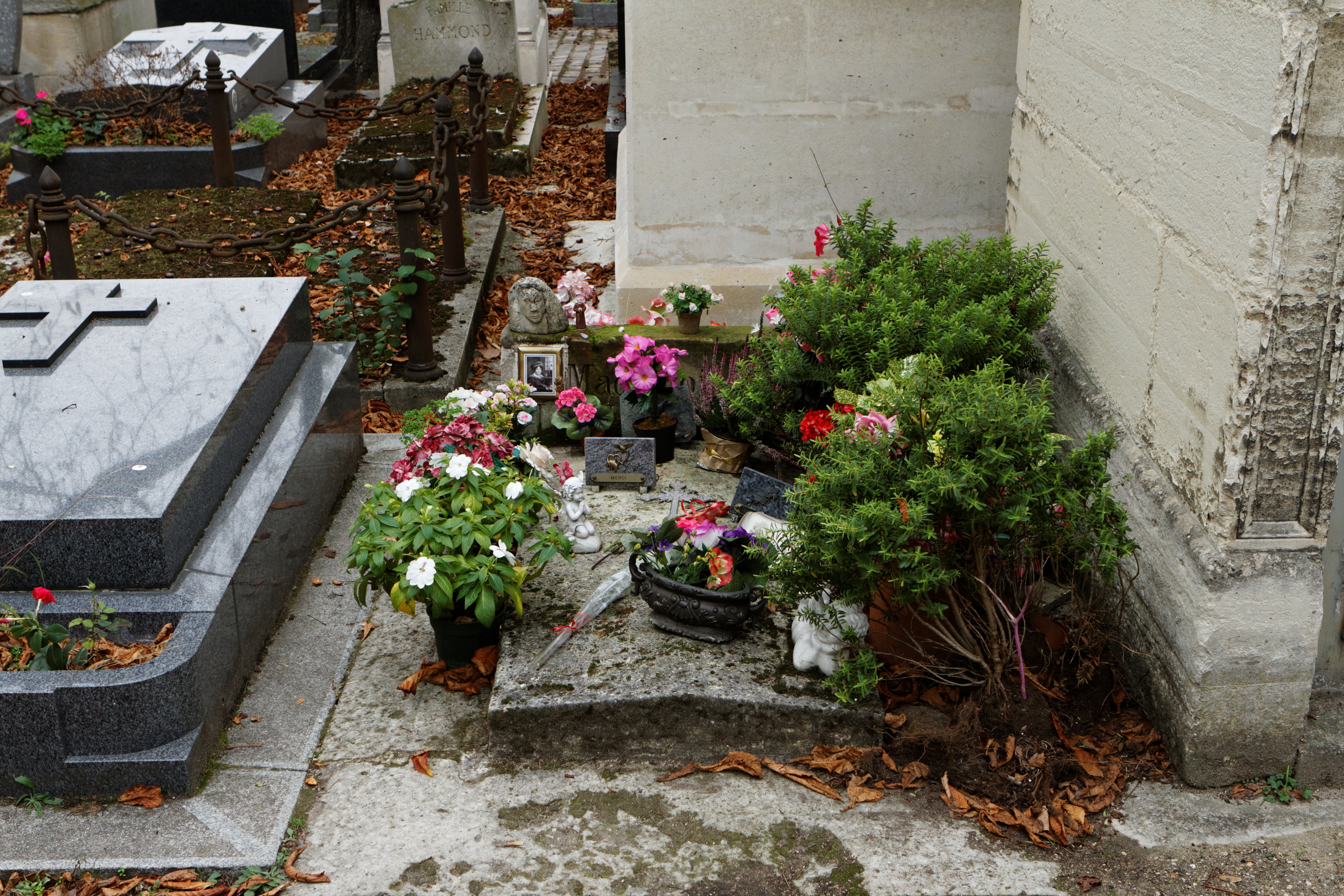
Grave of Lenormand, Père Lachaise Cemetery, Paris, France

Lenormand died in Paris on 25 June 1843 and is buried in Division 3 of Père Lachaise Cemetery. She left behind a fortune of 500,000 Francs, and left no heirs other than a nephew who, at the time of her death, was in the army. A devout Catholic, her nephew burned all of her occult paraphernalia, taking only the monetary fortune that she left behind.

== Works ==
- Les souvenirs prophétiques d'une sibylle sur les causes secrétes de son arrestation - Paris (1814) (592 pages). The English translation of the title may be “Prophetic Memories of a Sibyl on the Secret Causes of Her Arrest”.
- Anniversaire de la mort de l'impératrice Josephine (1815). The English translation of the title may be “Anniversary of the Death of Empress Josephine”
- La sibylle au tombeau de Louis XVI (1816). The English translation of the title may be “The Sibyl at the Tomb of Louis XVI”
- Les oracles sibyllins ou la suite des souvenirs prophétiques - Paris (1817) (528 pages). “The Sibylline Oracles or the Continuation of the Prophetic Memories” in English.
- La sibylle au congrès d'Aix-la-Chapelle (1819) (316 pages). “The Sibyl at the Congress of Aachen” in English.
- Mémoires historiques et secrets de l'impératrice Joséphine, Marie-Rose Tascher-de-la-Pagerie, première épouse de Napoléon Bonaparte - Paris (1820) (556 pages). “Historical and Secret Memoirs of Empress Josephine, Marie-Rose Tascher-de-la-Pagerie, First Wife of Napoleon Bonaparte” in English.
- Mémoire justificatif présenté par Mlle Le Normand (1821) (20 pages). “Justificatory Memoir Presented by Miss Le Normand” in English.
- Cri de l'honneur (1821) (18 pages). “Cry of Honor” in English.
- Souvenirs de la Belgique - Cent jours d'infortunes où le procès mémorable (1822) (416 pages). “Memories of Belgium - One Hundred Days of Misfortunes or the Memorable Trial” in English.
- L'ange protecteur de la France au tombeau de Louis XVIII (1824)
- L'ombre immortelle de Catherine II au tombeau d'Alexandre Ier (1826)
- L'ombre de Henri IV au palais d'Orléans (1830) (107 pages)
- Le petit homme rouge au château des Tuileries - Paris (1831) (107 pages). “The Little Red Man at the Tuileries Palace” in English.
- Manifeste des dieux sur les affaires de France (1832) (60 pages). “Manifesto of the Gods on the Affairs of France” in English.
- Arrêt suprême des dieux de l'Olympe en faveur de Mme. la duchesse de Berry et de son fils (1833) (144 pages). “Supreme Decree of the Gods of Olympus in Favor of Madame the Duchess of Berry and Her Son” in English.

Possibly author of

- Histoire de Jean VI. de Portugal, depuis sa naissance jusqu'à sa mort en 1826. - Paris : Ponthieu, 1827

== Lenormand cards ==
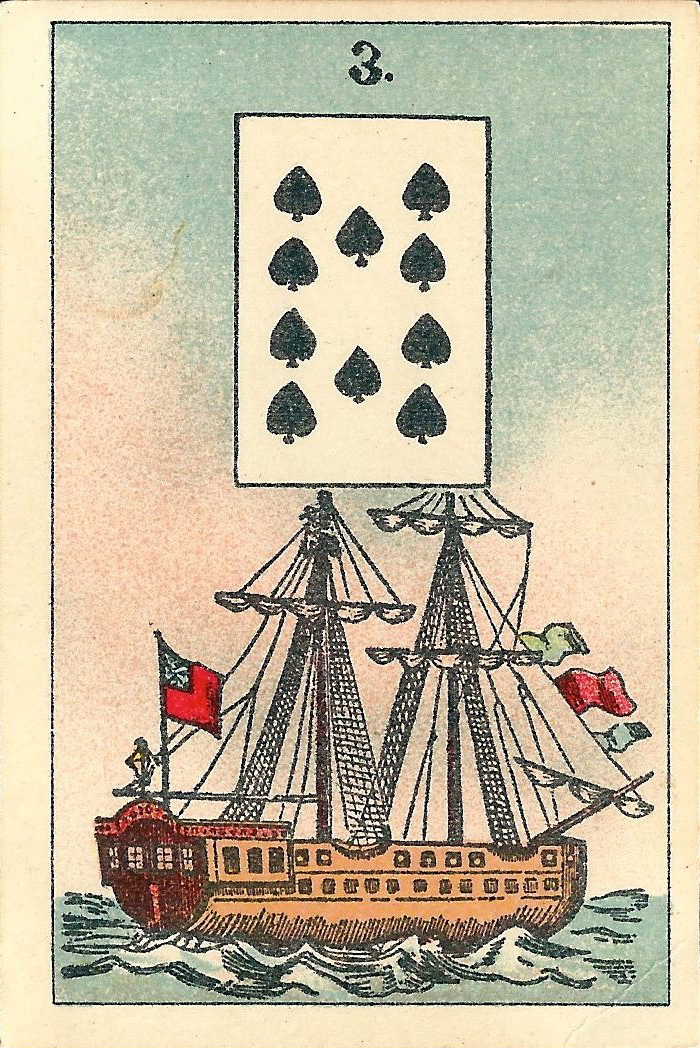
A Lenormand card based on a deck from 1854

After Lenormand's death her name was used on several cartomancy decks. This included a deck of 36 illustrated cards known as the Petit Lenormand, or simply "Lenormand cards", still used extensively today. It is commonly used for divination in France, the Low Countries, Central Europe, the Balkans, and Russia. It eventually spread to Brazil, probably through European and Russian emigres.

=== Das Spiel der Hoffnung ===
The 36-card Petite Lenormand tarot deck is modelled on a deck of cards published circa 1799 called Das Spiel der Hoffnung (The Game of Hope), a game of chance designed by Johann Kaspar Hechtel of Nuremberg.

==== Rules of Play ====
It was originally meant to be laid out in a 6 x 6 grid of cards and played as a boardgame, with #1 (The Rider) as the start and #35 (The Anchor / Hope) as the end. Movement was determined with a pair of standard six-sided dice. Some cards granted money from the pot or moved the player forward to another card. Others forced the player to pay into the pot or moved them backwards. If the player landed on #8 (The Coffin) or overshot #35 by 1 and ended up on #36 (The Cross) instead, they were stuck there -- the player couldn't get out until they either rolled a double number on a later turn (like two "1s" or two "6s") or another player landed on the card. If the player rolled too high and overshot #36, they deducted the number of spaces to #36 from the result and then moved backwards for the remainder (for example, a player who was on #32 rolls a result of 8, they subtract 4 from the result [36 - 32 = 4] and then go backwards four spaces to #28 [32 - 4 = 28]).

It also had German- and/or French-style playing cards depicted on them in the upper field so it could double as a standard German 36-card deck. If used as a card deck, the numbered cards in each suit ranged from 6 to 9, followed by the Panier (or "banner", representing the 10 card), the three Face Cards (Untermann (Jack), Obermann (Queen) and König (King)), and the Daus (or "Deuce", representing the 2) replacing the Ace.

==== Used as Cartomancy or Divination ====
Divination is carried out by either laying out a spread or a grid of cards. A spread is usually of 3 or 5 cards laid out left to right. A grid is usually of three cards in three rows (3x3). The topic of the spread is the center card on the second row and the other cards are interpreted in how they relate to or influence it. There is also the Grande Tableau ("Great Scene"), in which the whole deck is laid out in a grid of four rows of nine cards (4x9) or five rows (four rows of eight cards and the fifth row having only four cards). The reader interprets the pattern to see how all the cards are connected to the topic or person the reading is for (the Querant).

Cards of the Petit Lenormand deck
#	Name	Rank	Suit	Divinatory Meaning
1	Rider (Cavalier / Ritter), Cyclist (Radler)	9	Hearts	Messages, Energy, Passion, Speed, Activity, News, Young Athletic Person
2	Trefoil (Dreiblatt), Clover (Klee)	6	Hawkbells (Diamonds)	Luck, Lightheartedness, Small Happinesses, Opportunity, Being Untroubled, Comedy
3	Ship (Schiff)	Panier (10)	Leaves (Spades)	Departure, Farewell, Distance, Voyage, Travel, Journey, Adventure, Trading
4	House (Haus)	König (King)	Hearts	Home, Establishment, Safety, Tradition, Custom, Privacy, Conservation, What is Under your Roof
5	Tree / Trees (Bäum / Bäume)	7	Hearts	Health, Growth, Grounded, Past Connection, Personal Growth, Spirituality, Family/Ancestors.
6	Cloud / Clouds (Wolken)	König (King)	Acorns (Clubs)	Confusion, Lack of clarity, Misunderstanding, Insecurity, Doubt, Hidden Secrets
7	Snake (Schlange)	Obermann (Queen)	Acorns (Clubs)	Desire, Seduction, Deception, Craving, Attraction, Sexuality, Wisdom, Forbidden Knowledge
8	Coffin (Sarg)	9	Hawkbells (Diamonds)	Ending, Dying, Funeral, Loss, Grief, Mourning, Sadness, Ill Health
9	Bouquet (Strauß)	Obermann (Queen)	Leaves (Spades)	Flattery, Social Life, Pleasantness, Cordiality Etiquette, Politeness, Appreciation, Beauty, Art, An Unexpected Gift
10	Scythe (Sense)	Untermann (Jack)	Hawkbells (Diamonds)	Accidents, Hasty Decisions, Danger, A Warning, Speed, Reckoning, A Decision that Cannot be Undone.
11	Whip (Peitsche), Broom (Besen)	Untermann (Jack)	Acorns (Clubs)	Conflict, Discussions, Arguments, Debate, Scolding, Opposition, Objection, Violence, Repetitive Actions, Sexual Behaviour.
12	Birds (Vogeln), Owl (Uhu)	7	Hawkbells (Diamonds)	Worry, Excitement, Gossip, Chattering, Nervousness, Anxiety, An Old Couple, Conversation In-Person (as compared to online, via SMS or over the phone)
13	Child (Kind)	Untermann (Jack)	Leaves (Spades)	New Beginnings, Child, Toddler, Play, Inexperience, Innocence, Immaturity, Small, New, Vulnerable
14	Fox (Fuchs)	9	Acorns (Clubs)	Selfishness, Self Care, Trickery, Suspicion, Cunning, Caution (modern interpretations also can have 9-5 work as the main interpretation, ie, 'what you do to feed your family')
15	Bear (Bär)	Panier (10)	Acorns (Clubs)	Power, Leadership, Dominance, Influence, Short temper, Strength of character, Boss, Matriarch, Hirsuit, a Body Builder or Over-weight Person
16	Star (Stern)	6	Hearts	Hope, Inspiration, Optimism, Spirituality, Dreams, Progress to Goals
17	Stork (Storch)	Obermann (Queen)	Hearts	Change, Transition, Movement, Recurrence, New Cycle, Yearning
18	Dog (Hund)	Panier (10)	Hearts	Loyalty, Friendship, A Follower, Devotion, Obedience, Support
19	Tower (Tor)	6	Leaves (Spades)	Authority, Solitude, Loneliness, Isolation, Aloofness, Ego, Arrogance
20	Garden (Garten)	8	Leaves (Spades)	Public Affairs, Society, Culture, Teamwork, Fame, Social Networks
21	Mountain (Berge)	8	Acorns (Clubs)	Difficulties, Problems, Obstacles, Impairment, Hurdles, Struggles, Challenge
22	Crossroads (Kreuzung)	Obermann (Queen)	Hawkbells (Diamonds)	Choices, Many Opportunities, Travel, Separation, Hesitation, Decisions
23	Mouse / Mice (Mäus / Mäuse)	7	Acorns (Clubs)	Dwindling, Deficiency, Depletion, Destruction, Defect, Flaw, Disease
24	Heart (Herz)	Untermann (Jack)	Hearts	Love, Amicability, Romanticization, Forgiveness, Reconciliation, Softness, Charity
25	Ring (Ring)	Daus (Ace)	Acorns (Clubs)	Commitment, Promise, Honor, Partnership, Cooperation, Cycles
26	Book (Buch)	Panier (10)	Hawkbells (Diamonds)	Secrets, Knowledge, Education, Information, Research, Studies
27	Letter (Brief)	7	Leaves (Spades)	Document, Email, Speech, Conversations, Expression, Information, Communication
28	Man; Animus (Spirit)	Daus (Ace)	Hearts	If the Querent is Male: The Querent. If the Querent is Female: Male in Querent’s Life (Male Friend, Partner, Family Member)
29	Woman; Anima (Spirit)	Daus (Ace)	Leaves (Spades)	If the Querent is Female: The Querent. If the Querent is Male: Female in Querent’s Life (Female Friend, Partner, Family Member)
30	Lilies (Lilien)	König (King)	Leaves (Spades)	Sensuality, Sex, Virtue, Morality, Ethics, Wisdom
31	Sun (Sonne)	Daus (Ace)	Hawkbells (Diamonds)	Happiness, Victory, Success, Power, Warmth, Truth
32	Moon (Mond)	8	Hearts	Subconscious, Intuition, Emotions, Fears, Desires, Fantasy
33	Key (Schlüssel)	8	Hawkbells (Diamonds)	Openness, Revelation, Unlocking, Achievement, Liberation, Resolution
34	Fish (Fische)	König (King)	Hawkbells (Diamonds)	Finances, Business, Wealth, Values, Gain, Abundance
35	Anchor (Anker), Hope (Hoffnung)	9	Leaves (Spades)	Stability, Restraint, Security, Resilience, Durability, Laying Foundations
36	Cross (Kreutz)	6	Acorns (Clubs)	Duty, Conviction, Suffering, Burden, Intolerance, Principles, Indoctrination

== Sources ==
- Decker, Ronald; Depaulis, Thierry; Dummett, Michael (1996). A Wicked Pack of Cards: The Origins of the Occult Tarot. London: Gerald Duckworth and Company. ISBN 9780715627136.
