= MJF (disambiguation) =

Maxwell Jacob Friedman is an American professional wrestler.

MJF may also refer to:

== People ==
- Michael J. Fox, Canadian and American activist and retired actor

== Politics ==
- Madheshi Jana Adhikar Forum, Nepal (Madhesi People's Rights Forum, Nepal), former political party in Nepal (2007–2015)
- Madheshi Jana Adhikar Forum, Nepal (Loktantrik), former political party in Nepal (2009–2017)

== Transport ==
- MJF, IATA code for Mosjøen Airport in Kjærstad, Norway
- MJF, Indian Railways station code for Malkajgiri Junction railway station in Telangana, India

== Other uses ==
- MJF Holdings, holding company of Dilmah tea company in Sri Lanka
- Multi-jet fusion, a technique used in 3D printing
