= Cartomancy =

Type of divination using cards

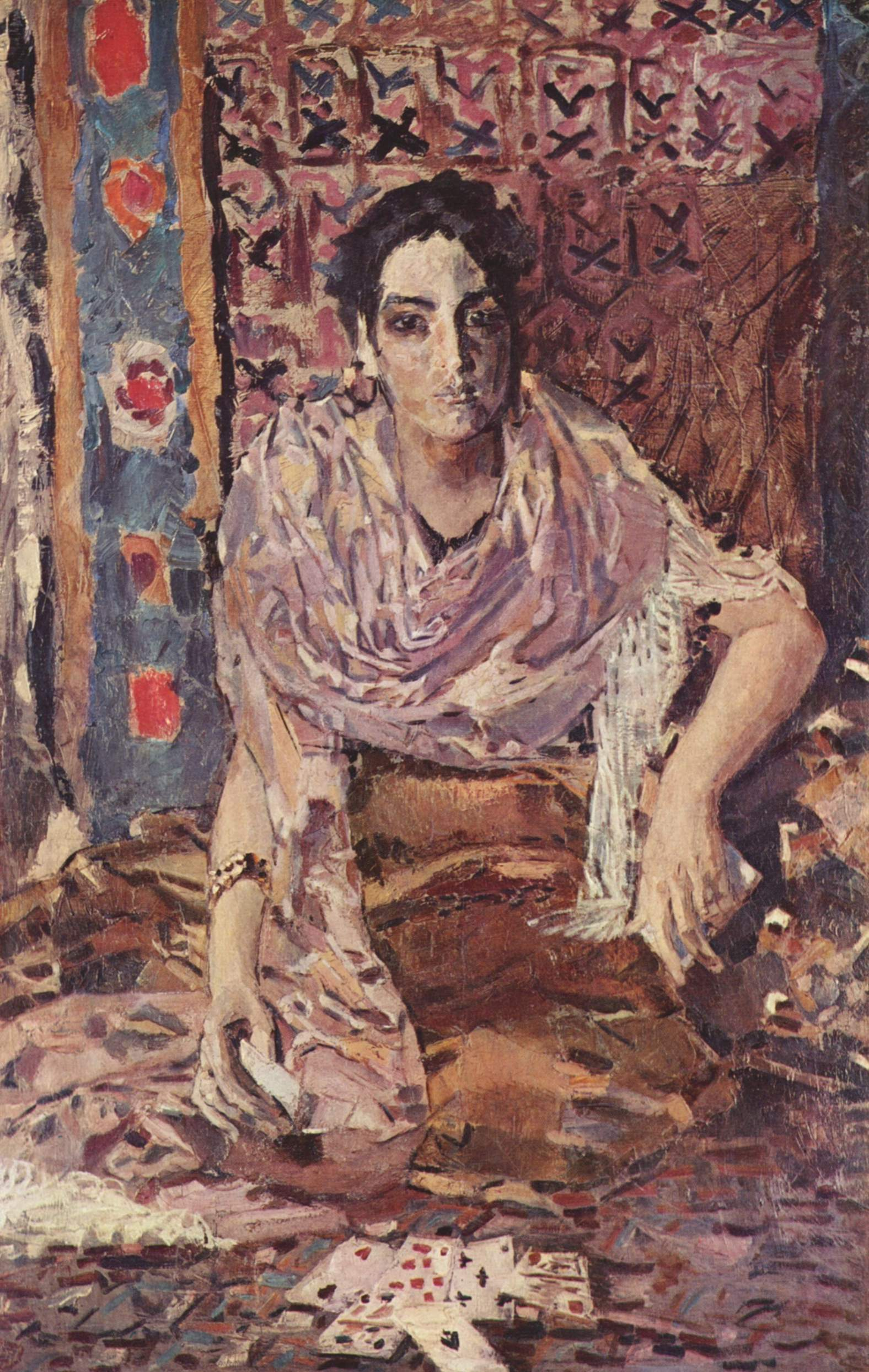
The Fortune Teller (1895) by Art Nouveau painter Mikhail Vrubel, depicting a cartomancer

Cartomancy is fortune-telling or divination using a deck of cards. Forms of cartomancy appeared soon after playing cards were introduced into Europe in the 14th century. Practitioners of cartomancy are generally known as cartomancers, card readers, or simply readers.

Cartomancy using standard playing cards was the most popular form of providing fortune-telling card readings in the 18th, 19th, and 20th centuries. The standard 52-card deck is often augmented with jokers or even with the blank card found in many packaged decks. In France, the 32-card piquet stripped deck is most typically used in cartomantic readings, although the 52 card deck can also be used. (A piquet deck can be a 52-card deck with all of the 2s through the 6s removed. This leaves all of the 7s through the 10s, the face cards, and the aces.)

In English-speaking countries, the most common form of cartomancy is generally tarot card reading. Tarot cards are almost exclusively used for this purpose in these places.

It is popular among Romani people.

== History ==
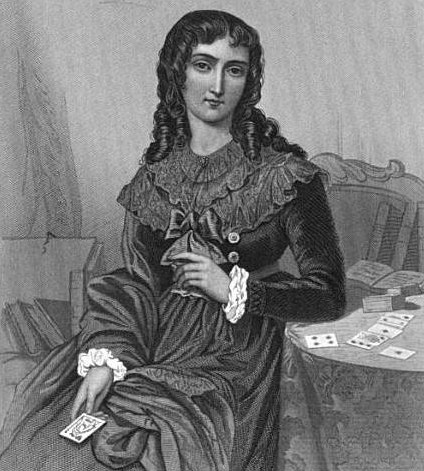
Portrait of Mme. Lenormand from the Court of Napoleon.

Cartomancy can be traced back to 15th century Spain and 16th century Italy. It was mentioned in writing by Giovanni Pico della Mirandola, as well as in 1540 by Francesco Marcolini in Le sorti intitolate giardino d’i pensieri, using cards and a book of oracles. In Spain, in 1556, Martín de Azpilcueta wrote the Compendio del Manual de Confessores, in which he explicitly condemns card-based divination.

During the pre-revolution Enlightenment Period, cartomancy reached its height of popularity in France. It was introduced to the public at large by Etteilla, under the name "cartomancy" for a game with 32 cards (Le petit Etteilla or L'Art de tirer les cartes 1753, published in 1791). This gave way to tarot cards founded on later works, such as Antoine Court de Gébelin's interpretation of the Tarot of Marseilles. This type of cartomancy was revived by Marie-Anne Lenormand, better known as Mademoiselle Lenormand, who claimed to have advised various political and artistic celebrities of her time. After her death and during the centuries that followed, numerous other card games were published in multiple European countries under the names Jeu de Mademoiselle Lenormand, or Grand Lenormand, or Le Petit Lenormand.

Cartomancy as it was understood at the end of the 20th century and the beginning of the 21st century, was primarily revived from Court de Gébelin and Etteilla, generally using (though not exclusively) Tarot of Marseilles and its offshoots (Wirth, Rider-Waite, etc.). However, in the 21st century, cartomancy almost always uses the Tarot of Marseilles or the Tarot de Besançon, modernized tarot decks, standard playing cards, or any other type of playing cards. The 20th century also saw the development of many card games marketed as divination tools, which were markedly different from standard playing cards, historic playing cards, or tarot cards.

Lady of Spades card from a French cartomancy game.

Historically, it has never been proven that a deck of playing cards was also specifically created for cartomancy.

Recently, a game entitled "Cartomancy game for the amusement of ladies" was discovered. As it was registered on April 15th, 1788, it is the first game labelled "Cartomancy" in the world. This game of 66 cards depicts King Louis XVI in effigy, Queen Marie Antoinette on the second card, ministers, and foreign rulers with allegories on the reverse. The game was the origin of many iconographic references for divination tools in the centuries to come. Its creator, Mr. Duhamel, Count of Précourt and the Colonel-in-Chief, had previously been implicated in the Affair of the Diamond Necklace

In 1948 France, Paul Marteau, then the director of Grimaud card makers, published Le Tarot de Marseille, another work that would become important in cartomancy practices linked to tarot, just as Paul Marteau's version of the Tarot of Marseilles (actually a modification of a delayed copy of the Nicolas Conver tarot) had international influence, which would mark an important stage in the history of cartomancy.

== Card-based divination ==
The basics of card-based divination consist of using one's intuition and active listening skills in order to glean certain elements of a person's life to then link it back to the symbolism in the cards. Cartomancy skeptics equate this to cold reading.

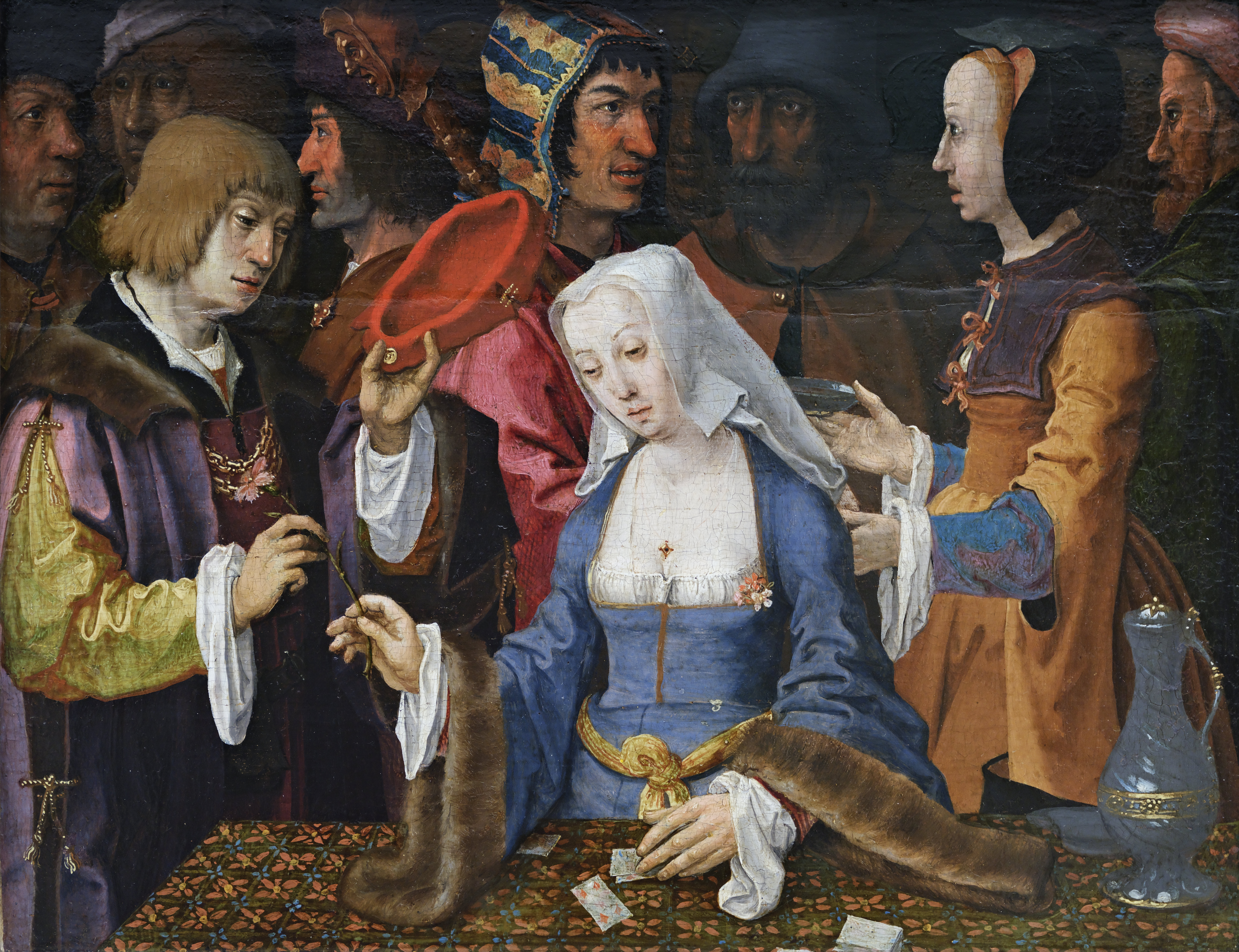
The Cartomancer fortune-teller (c. 1508, Lucas van Leyden)

When cartomancers use tarot cards, it can also be called taromancy or tarology. Most other cartomancers tend to use English, French, or Spanish standard playing cards.

Cartomancers can also use cards specifically created to be used in divination. These card decks are often called oracles, each having a unique number of cards representing predictions of varying degrees of accuracy, which are interpreted in specific combinations. Multiple oracles have been published, such as L'Oracle Belline, L'Oracle Lenormand, and l'Oracle Gé. In these cases, interpretation relies more on the randomness of playing cards more than the card reader's sensibilities or original interpretations, as their interpretations are heavily constrained and guided by the elements on the cards.

== Playing cards in relation to tarot cards ==
French cartomancy is mainly based on French-suited playing cards: spades, hearts, clubs, and diamonds. Nowadays, cartomancy usually uses the 32-card deck, followed by the 52-card deck.

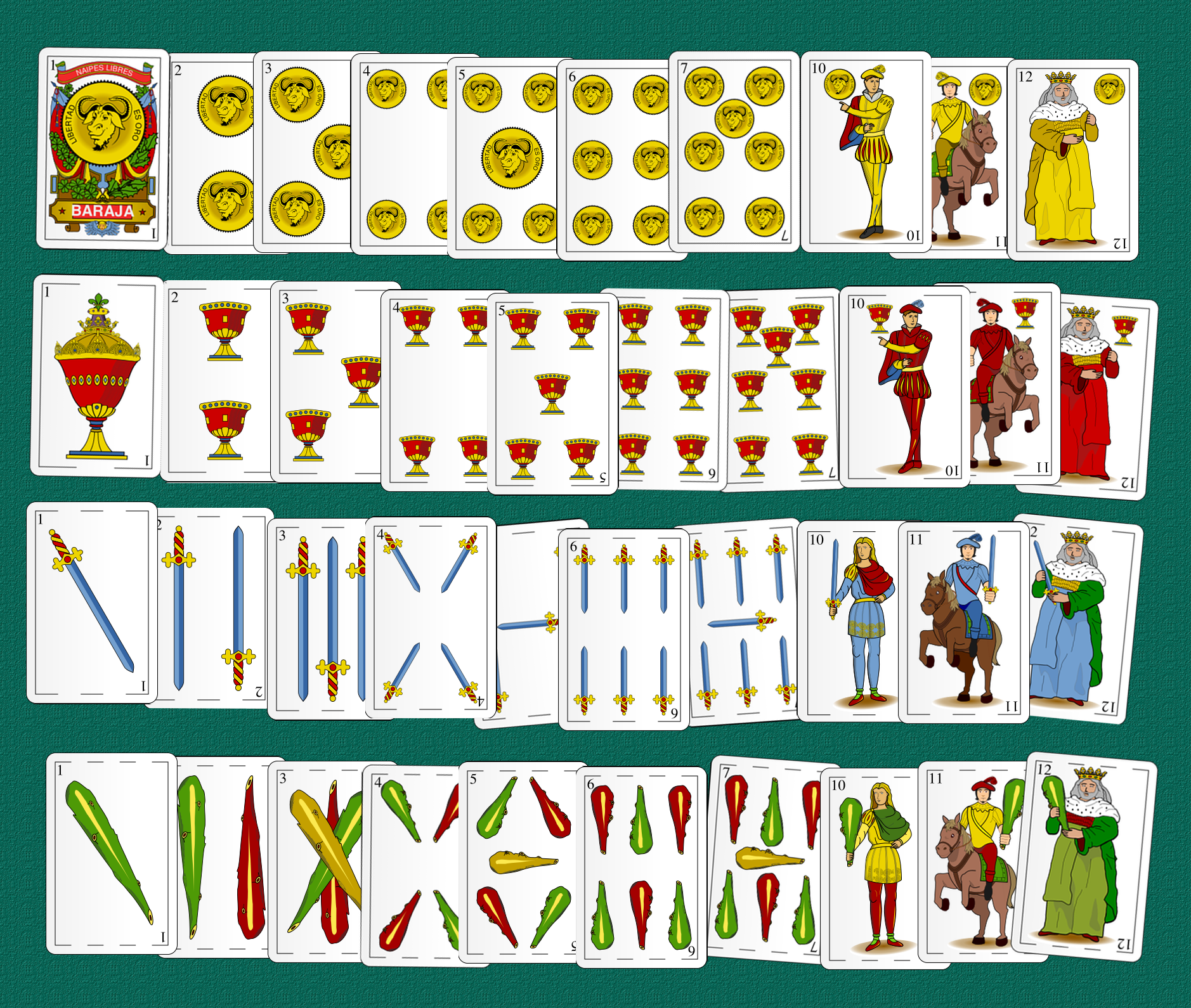
A deck of Spanish playing cards with coins, cups, wands/batons, and swords, similar to tarot suits.

The four suits of coins, cups, wands, and swords, common in Italian and Spanish playing cards as well as tarot decks (Italian and Tarot of Marseilles), bolster the divinatory meanings of the four-colored suits (spades, hearts, clubs, and diamonds), which is moreso found in tarot than standard playing cards. There is no consensus on the connection of modern suits to traditional ones. There are relationships between cups-hearts and swords-spades, and possibly wands-clubs and coins-diamonds, although certain cartomancy traditions associate wands with diamonds and pentacles with clubs.

== Scientific point of view ==
The action of "predicting" is not generally recognized by the scientific community outside of statistical modelling. Popular divination practices such as cartomancy do not have any scientific basis.

The perceived effectivness of cartomancy and other card-based divination practices can be attributed to the Barnum Effect or the Bertram Forer Effect.

== Cartomancy in literature ==
- Éléonore Tenaille de Vaulabelle published La Tireuse de cartes: Vaudeville en un Acte, in Paris, 1848.
- Honoré de Balzac was adept at cartomancy and believed in its scientific validity. He portrayed it onstage through the character of Madame Fontaine in La Comédie humaine, who worked from a dingy room on the Rue Vieille de Temple in Paris. In a five-franc reading, she pulls cards and informs the client about their past. In a hundred-franc reading, a black hen and the demon Astaroth intercede and allow her to predict the client's future.
- In contemporary Quebecois literature, cartomancy has become a recurring literary theme as is seen in the works of Nelly Arcan, Kev Lambert, Sophie Létourneau, Anne-Renée Caillé, or in Clairvoyantes, the tarot-short story collection by Audrée Wilhelmy.

== See also ==
- Johann Kaspar Hechtel
- Marie Anne Lenormand
- Patience (game)
- Suhl card reader case
- Teuila cards
