= Bugle (car brand) =

British car brand

Bugle is a British car brand founded in 1970.

== Brand history ==
Roland Sharman, who already had experience selling VW buggies from GP, founded Bugle Automotive Traction & Manufacturing Company of London in Fulham in 1970. There was a connection to Lotusmere. The production of automobiles began. The brand name is Bugle. After a fire the company moved to Reading in 1971. In 1971 the name was changed to Bugle Development & Marketing Ltd. In 1972 another fire caused the temporary end.

In the early 1970s Stephen Foster of Fibresports of Basildon purchased some molds, made kits with them and offered them between 1972 and 1979. The brand name is not known.

From 1979 to 1985, Chris Watson of CW Autos of Yorkshire continued production and marketing as Bugle. In 1995 James Hall of GT Moldings of Portslade took over the original molds, redesigned them and offered kits until 2003. Brothers Tony and Rob Armstrong from Chelmsford took over the project in 2003, founded Bugle Buggies and have been making Bugles ever since. A total of around 891 copies have been created so far.

Exports have so far taken place to the US, Saudi Arabia, Malta, Portugal, Cyprus, Jordan, Sardinia and Switzerland.

== Vehicles ==
=== Buggy ===
VW buggies are created. At first they resembled the American Bugetta. The basis is a shortened chassis from the VW Beetle. Hussein I of Jordan ordered four vehicles and Rocket Wheel Industries of California ordered 75 kits. The price of £160 for a kit in the early 1970s was higher than comparable offers. Since 1995, the chassis have been shortened less.

A vehicle was auctioned at the end of 2017 for £4,840.

=== Buggy Plus 2 ===
This model was only available from 1970 to 1972 (by Bugle Automotive Traction & Manufacturing Company of London) and from 1979 to 1985 (by CW Autos). The basis was the uncut chassis of the VW Beetle with a 240 cm wheelbase. Only 20 copies were made.

== Literature ==
- Steve Hole: A-Z of Kit Cars. The definitive encyclopaedia of the UK's kit-car industry since 1949. Haynes Publishing, Sparkford 2012, ISBN 978-1-84425-677-8, p. 47.
- James Hale: Dune Buggy Handbook. The A–Z of VW-based buggies since 1964. Veloce Publishing, Dorchester 2013, ISBN 978-1-84584-378-6, p. 44–45.
