= Johann Kaspar Hechtel =

German designer of parlour games (1771–1799)

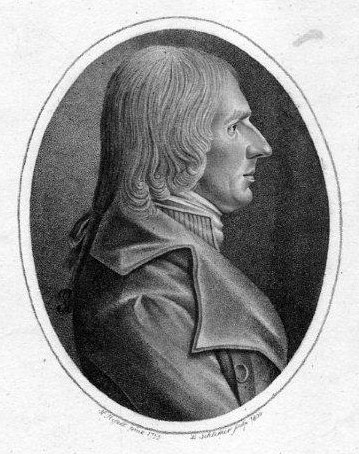
- Stipple engraving portrait by Leonhard Schlemmer (1800) after Leonhard Heinrich Hessell (1799)
- Born: Johann Kaspar Hechtel; 1 May 1771; Nuremberg, Bavaria, Holy Roman Empire
- Died: 20 December 1799 (aged 28); Nuremberg, Bavaria, Holy Roman Empire
- Occupations: Businessman, writer, board game designer

Johann Kaspar Hechtel (1 May 1771 – 20 December 1799) was a German businessman, owner of a brass factory in Nuremberg, non-fiction writer and designer of parlour games, including the prototype for the Petit Lenormand cartomancy deck. Hechtel is also supposed to have contributed anonymously to some treatises on physics.

== Early life ==
Hechtel was born on 1 May 1771 in Nuremberg, Germany.

== Death ==
Hechtel died on 20 December 1799 in Nuremberg during a smallpox epidemic. He was survived by his wife.

== Works ==
- Sammlung freundschaftlicher Denkmale und kleine Lehren der Weisheit und Tugend. Zum Gebrauch in Stammbücher und zur Geistes- und Sittenveredlung junger Leute bestimmt. (Bieling, 1798)
- Second edition: Denkmale der Freundschaft und kleine Lehren der Weisheit und Tugend, zum Gebrauch in Stammbücher und Geistes- und Sittenveredlung junger Leute (Bieling, 1803)
- Third edition: Denkmale der Freundschaft für Stammbücher und moralische Lehren zur Sittenveredlung junger Personen (Bieling, 1809)
- Fourth edition: Denkmale der Freundschaft für Stammbücher und moralische Lehren zur Sittenveredlung junger Personen (Bieling, 1819)
- Beiträge zur geselligen Freude oder Auswahl neuer Karten- Pfänder- und Unterhaltungsspiele zum Nutzen und Vergnügen, mit illumirten Kupfern (Bieling, 1798)
- Pandora, ein neues Würfel- und Gesellschaftspiel mit 24 Fragen und 144 scherzhaften Antworten (Bieling, 1798)
- Das Spiel der Hoffnung, eine angenehme Gesellschaftsunterhaltung mit 36 neuen illumirten Figurenkarten, franz. und deutsch (Le Jeu de l'Esperance, accompagné d'un nouveau jeu de cartes à figures) (Bieling, c1799)

== Das Spiel der Hoffnung Deck (c.1799) ==
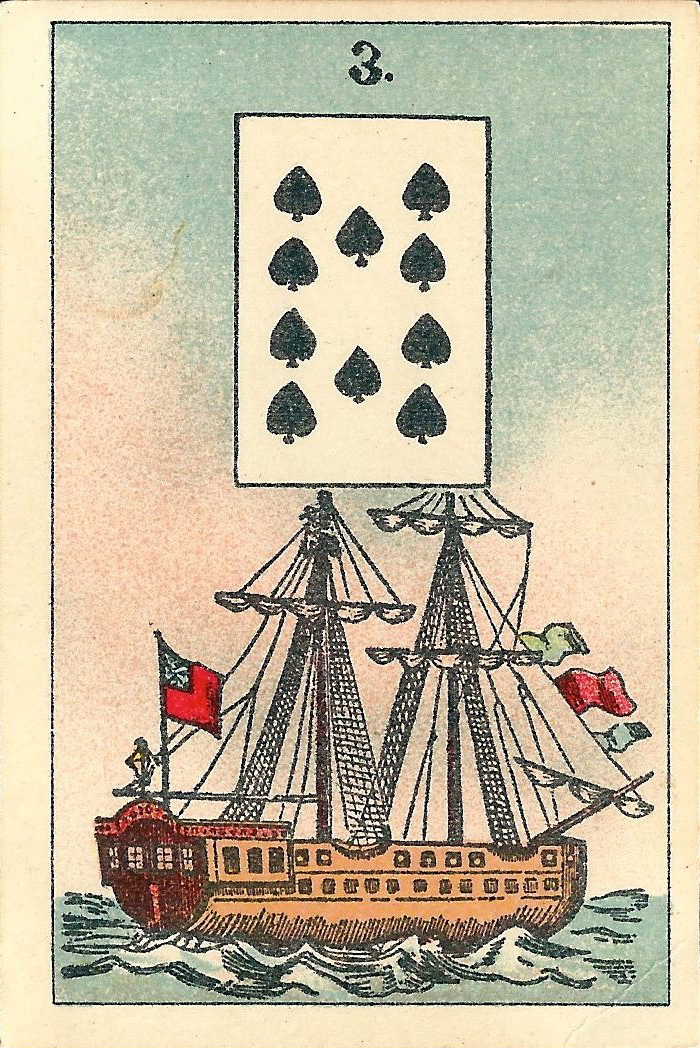
The No.3 Card (The Ship) from a Lenormand Deck. 1842 Edition, printed c.1890 in Germany

In the mid 19th century, after the death of the famous French fortune-teller Marie Anne Lenormand, Lenormand's name was used on several cartomancy decks, including a deck of 36 illustrated cards known as the Petit Lenormand or simply Lenormand cards still used extensively today. The 36 card Lenormand deck is modeled on a deck of cards published around 1799 as part of Das Spiel der Hoffnung (The Game of Hope), a game of chance designed by Hechtel which was still being advertised in 1820. So-called Lenormand decks have the same card numbering, primary symbols and playing card associations as the cards in Hechtel's Das Spiel der Hoffnung game. Some examples of the game are included in an extensive collection of playing cards bequeathed to the British Museum by Lady Charlotte Schreiber. Das Spiel der Hoffnung is listed among Hechtel's works in an advertisement by publisher Gustav Philipp Jakob Bieling of Nuremberg dated 1799.

The "Game of Hope" cards usually have their playing card equivalents displayed in the upper field or worked into the design, with either the German or French suits being used. Swiss decks (like the first editions of the "Game of Hope") had both the equivalent German and French cards in the upper field. It only uses the 2, 6, 7, 8, 9, 10, Jack, Queen, and King of each suit; the Deuce (2 card) stands in the place of the Ace, and there are no Jokers.

The game can also be played with standard decks. The 54-card French deck discards both Jokers and the 2, 3, 4, and 5 of each suit, keeping the Ace and the Face Cards (King, Queen, and Jack). The 48-card German deck discards the 3, 4, and 5 of each suit. The German deck doesn't use Aces and renames the 2 as the Ass ("Ace") or Daus ("Deuce"), the 10 as the Panier ("Banner"), the Jack as the Unter (Untermann or "Lesser Knave", a sergeant or footman with the suit pip at the lower corner of the field), and the Queen as the Ober (Obermann or "Greater Knave", a knight or officer with the suit pip at the upper corner of the field). (Note: The Obers and Unters of each suit are depicted with different weaponry depending on their suit. The Ober and Unter of Acorns carry a mace and bossed shield, the Ober and Unter of Leaves are military musicians (with the Ober playing the drum and the Unter playing the fife), the Ober and Unter of Hearts are armed with polearms or quarterstaves, and the Ober and Unter of Bells are armed with swords.) The King (or Koenig) of each suit is shown crowned and holding a scepter, with one or two suit pips in the upper field.

#	Card	German Suit	French Suit
01	Rider; Cavalier	9 of Hearts	9 of Hearts
02	Trefoil; Clover	6 of Hawkbells	6 of Diamonds
03	Ship	Panier of Leaves	10 of Spades
04	House	König of Hearts	King of Hearts
05	Tree / Trees	7 of Hearts	7 of Hearts
06	Cloud / Clouds	König of Acorns	King of Clubs
07	Snake	Obermann of Acorns	Queen of Clubs
08	Coffin	9 of Hawkbells	9 of Diamonds
09	Bouquet	Obermann of Leaves	Queen of Spades
10	Scythe	Untermann of Hawkbells	Jack of Diamonds
11	Whip; Broom	Untermann of Acorns	Jack of Clubs
12	Birds (Vogeln); The Owl (Uhu)	7 of Hawkbells	7 of Diamonds
13	The Child	Untermann of Leaves	Jack of Spades
14	The Fox	9 of Acorns	9 of Clubs
15	The Bear	Panier of Acorns	10 of Clubs
16	The Star	6 of Hearts	6 of Hearts
17	The Stork	Obermann of Hearts	Queen of Hearts
18	The Dog	Panier of Hearts	10 of Hearts
19	The Tower	6 of Leaves	6 of Spades
20	The Garden	8 of Leaves	8 of Spades
21	The Mountain	8 of Acorns	8 of Clubs
22	The Crossroads	Obermann of Hawkbells	Queen of Diamonds
23	The Mouse / Mice	7 of Acorns	7 of Clubs
24	The Heart	Untermann of Hearts	Jack of Hearts
25	The Ring	Daus of Acorns	Ace of Clubs
26	The Book	Panier of Hawkbells	10 of Diamonds
27	The Letter	7 of Leaves	7 of Spades
28	Man; Animus (Spirit)	Daus of Hearts	Ace of Hearts
29	Woman; Anima (Spirit)	Daus of Leaves	Ace of Spades
30	Lilies	König of Leaves	King of Spades
31	The Sun	Daus of Hawkbells	Ace of Diamonds
32	The Moon	8 of Hearts	8 of Hearts
33	The Key	8 of Hawkbells	8 of Diamonds
34	Fishes	König of Hawkbells	King of Diamonds
35	The Anchor (Anker); Hope (Hoffnung)	9 of Leaves	9 of Spades
36	The Cross (Kreutz)	6 of Acorns	6 of Clubs
