= Suhl card reader case =

German legal case

The Suhl card reader case deals with the 1956 verdict on Charlotte Marquardt (born 1902 in Berlin, died 1975 in Suhl, East Germany). A court in Eastern Germany had condemned Marquardt, an amateur psychic and cartomancy practitioner, to twelve years' imprisonment. The verdict referred to so called Kriegs- und Boykotthetze, incitement to war and boycott: Marquardt had provided favorable forecasts for families preparing to leave East Germany, and when arrested, was in possession of an astrological handbook including a horoscope with a positive outlook on West Germany.

The judgment has been deemed barbaric and was mentioned several times in documentations about Unrechtsjustiz, systematic injustice in the GDR.

== Background of Marquardt ==
Charlotte Marquardt was born 1902 in Berlin and grew up in the family of a metal worker in Berlin-Weißensee. She worked as a telephone operator and typist, and in 1927 married an officer of the Schutzpolizei, who was transferred to Suhl. Marquardt was a housekeeper and had two sons with her husband. During the war, after her husband moved to Litzmannstadt (Łódź) in occupied Poland, she became acquainted with fortune-telling via her Polish housekeeper and began to practice it herself. The marriage ended in divorce; Marquardt's elder son was killed in action during auxiliary flak service while still a minor. She was then evacuated to Suhl with her younger son. She worked in a factory and continued practicing cartomancy for acquaintances, often in exchange for food or other goods. She started to do so within her family and friends but acquired a reputation within a larger circle.

In 1946, Artur Hofmann, KPD minister of the interior, issued a ban on commercial divination, chiromancy, phrenology and astrology in neighboring Saxony. There were penalties of up to 150 Reichsmark and the allocation of suspects to the Labor Office for reconstruction work. Under the German Empire and the Weimar Republic, divination had not been legally condemned, but the police forces of the various states had kept an eye on professional practitioners. Marquardt's card reading gained the envy of a neighbor. Starting in 1946 she filed reports with the police about Marquardt's guests and practices. The reports were unsuccessful at first, as Marquardt did not take money for her services.

In 1950 Marquardt started to work in the Suhl city library. She was fired in 1955 after providing a blacklisted book to a reader.

== Arrest, legal proceedings and verdict ==
Marquardt was arrested in 1955 after coming back from a visit to West Berlin, where she had met her brother. A Stasi lieutenant called Stoschek had identified various families whom Marquardt had advised from in 1951 prior to their leaving East Germany for the West. She had tried to predict a favorable timing and had backed the basic decision to leave for West Germany. She was therefore prosecuted for "incitement to boycott and war under Article 6 of the Constitution of the German Democratic Republic". On April 20, 1956, the Suhl SED newspaper, Freies Wort, published a report titled "Righteous atonement for unscrupulous abdication" about the verdict.

The written reasons of the judgement mention, as well a national horoscope of the Federal Republic of Germany, a further attempt to boycott and make a case for war. The horoscope had been found in a "Lorcher Astrologischer Kalender auf das Jahr 1956", an astrological calendar published by Karl Rohm in Lorch. When Marquardt was arrested, the calendar was still packed in the original cover, as she had received it as a present from her brother during her visit in Berlin. The mentioned horoscope for the Federal Republik of Germany predicted a decisive role of the western part in a future reunified Germany, based on a lucky junction, an astrological aspect (trine) between Jupiter, the Sun, and the Moon. The protocol of Marquardt's police interrogation alleges that her brother, as a Western agent, tried to convince Marquardt to spread propaganda supporting German unity according to the Bonner Muster (the pattern of Bonn).

Marquardt served her sentence in Hoheneck women's prison near Stollberg in the Erzgebirge. Several applications for early release were refused. She was released on probation in 1962. The authorities believed there was no longer a risk, as – after the construction of the wall – she would not be able to leave East Germany. Marquardt went to stay with the family of Ilse Gratz, a former inmate; they had become friends in Hoheneck. Gratz was relatively "small fry"; she had been sentenced to three years' imprisonment after recommending friends go to see her brother, who ran a hotel in West Germany. At the time as a mother with two small children she had been arrested on Christmas Eve in 1955, but was released one year later due to an amnesty. Marquardt's health was impaired by the harsh conditions of her imprisonment. She died of thyroid cancer in 1975.

== Documentation ==
The fate of Marquardt has been documented in contemporary West German collections about systematic injustice and the state of human rights in the GDR. Baldur Haase provided an account of the story in a documentary narrative. Haase himself was sentenced at the age of 20 to three years in prison and remained under close surveillance until the end of the GDR. Like Marquardt he was jailed for possessing a book, as he had received and read George Orwell's Nineteen Eighty-Four in an exchange with pen pals in western countries. After 1989, Haase became an author and was in demand as a Zeitzeuge, a witness recounting his experiences and that of others in lectures and readings to various audiences.
