= Paraphernalia =

Apparatus, equipment, or furnishing used for a particular activity

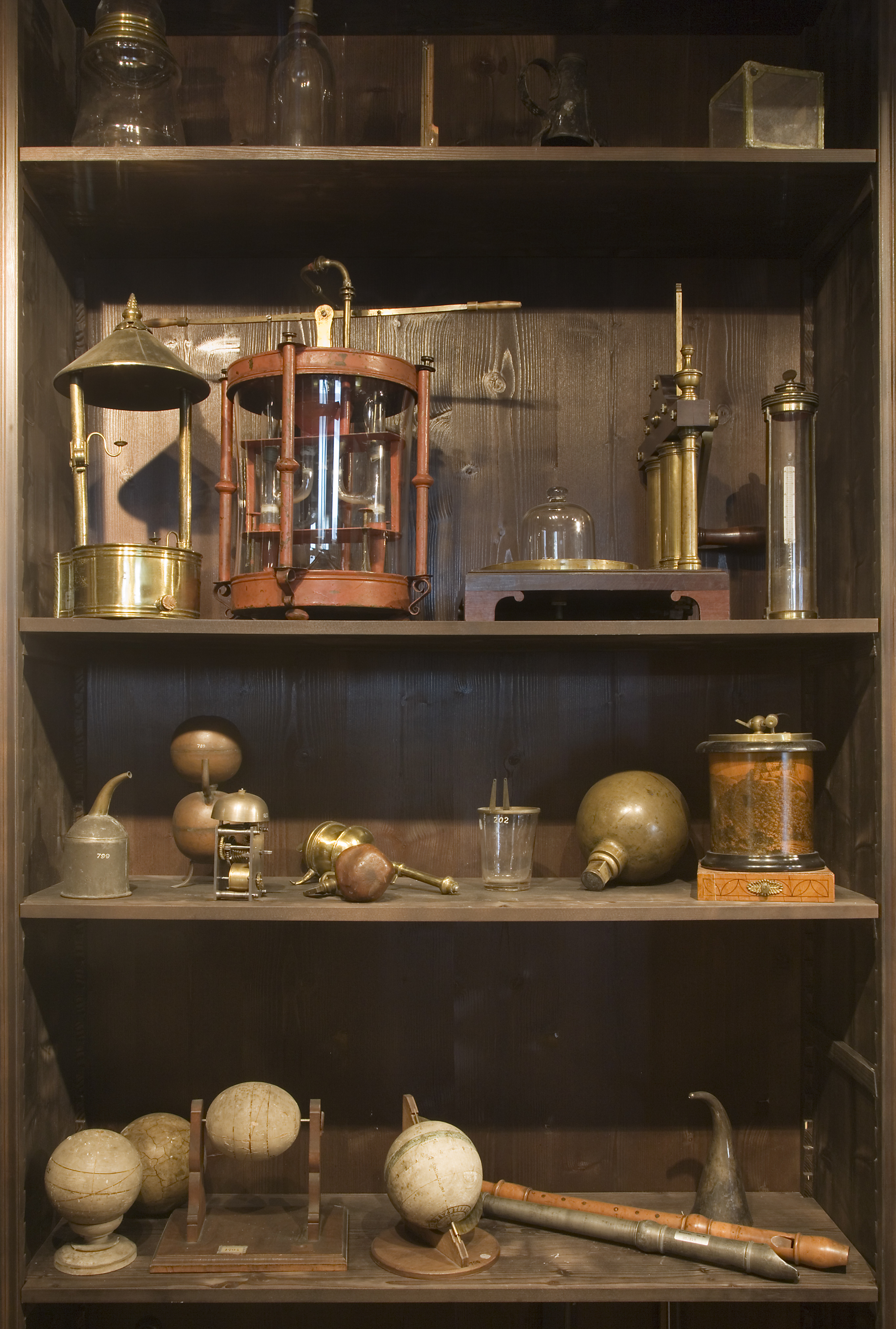
Assorted 18th- and 19th-century tools, instruments, and old-fashioned paraphernalia, Deutsches Museum, Munich, Germany

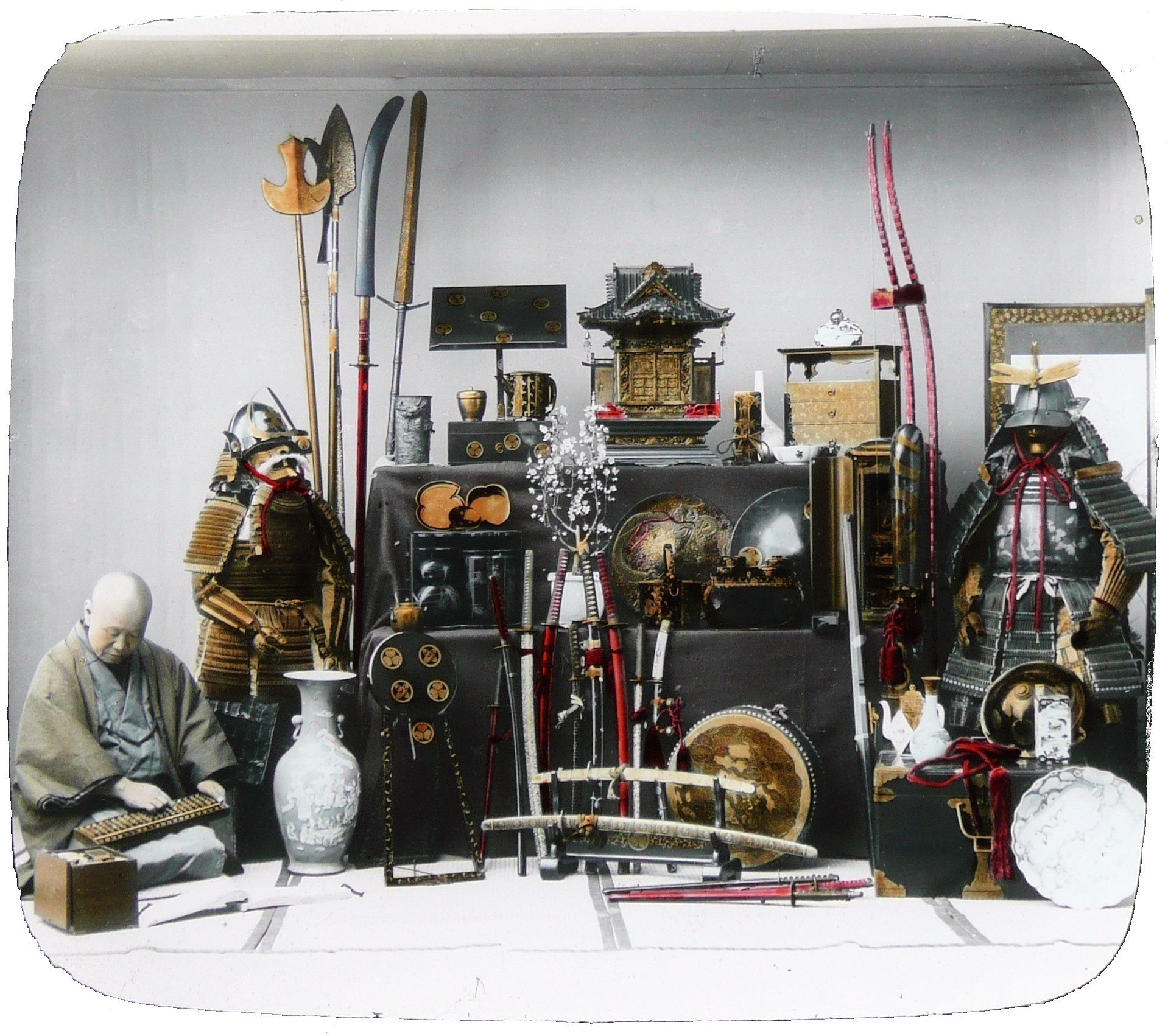
Old Japanese military paraphernalia

Paraphernalia refers to a collection of items or equipment associated with a particular activity, hobby, or lifestyle. The term is often used to describe the tools, accessories, or objects that are used in various fields, such as sports, arts and crafts, or specialized professions.

== Historical legal term ==
In legal language, "paraphernalia" is a term of art from older family law. The word "paraphernalia" is plural, meaning "things beyond the dowry". Paraphernalia were the separate property of a married woman, such as clothing and jewellery "appropriate to her station", but excluding the assets that may have been included in her dowry. The term originated in Roman law, but ultimately comes from Greek παράφερνα (parápherna), "beyond (para) the dowry (phernē)".

These sorts of property were considered the separate property of a married woman under coverture. A husband could not sell, appropriate, or convey good title to his wife's assets considered paraphernalia without her separate consent. They did not become a part of her husband's estate upon his death, and could be conveyed by a married woman's will.

Changes in family law and inheritance law (mirroring trends in the wider society, such as the several Married Woman's Property Acts of the various common law jurisdictions), have generally rendered the legal concept of paraphernalia obsolete.

=== In fiction ===
The legal concept of paraphernalia in this sense is an important plot point in Anthony Trollope's novel The Eustace Diamonds. In the novel, it was a matter of some consequence whether the title jewelry was an heirloom, property of the heirs, or a woman's paraphernalia, freely alienable by her.

== See also ==
- Collecting – Hobby of locating or acquiring items of interest
- Drug paraphernalia – Items associated with recreational drug use
- Fashion accessory – Item used to contribute to the wearer's outfit
- Kit (of components)
