= Teuila cards =

Fortune telling deck

Teuila cards are a pack of fortune-telling cards, likely brought from Samoa by Isobel Strong, stepdaughter of Robert Louis Stevenson. In her biography she recalls telling fortunes at garden parties using calling cards which she had painted symbols onto ("a horseshoe for luck, a bee to signify work, a heart for love, etc"). Her designs were later sold as a commercial deck of cards in the United States.

Both backs and fronts are coloured pictures, the back depicting a woman using the cards.

== See also ==
- Tarot cards
