= Occupational hazards of solar panel installation =

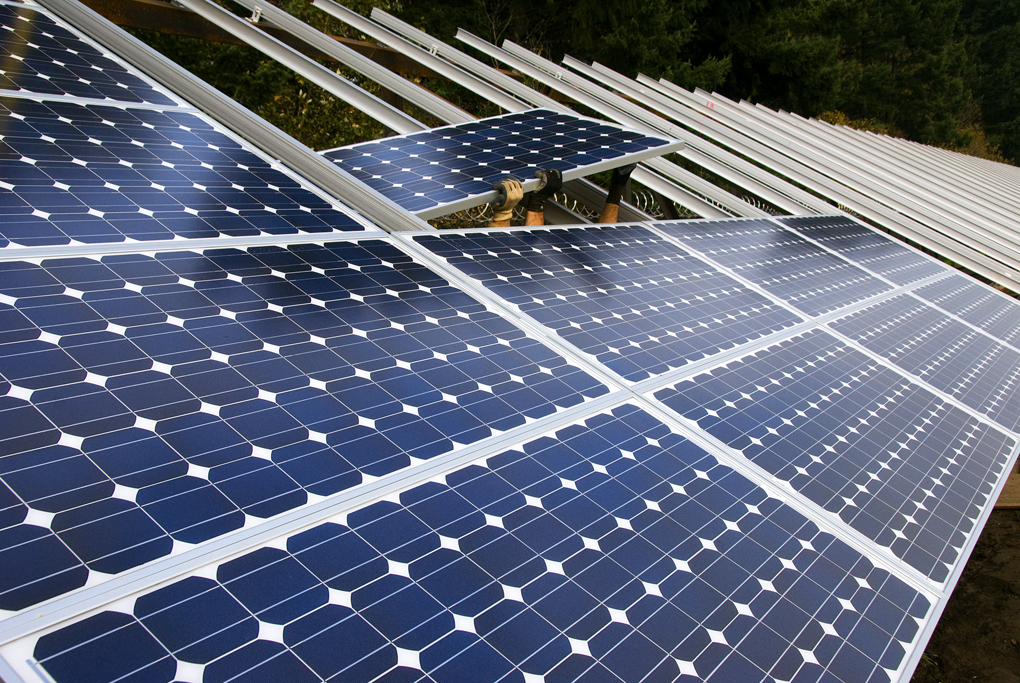
Installing solar panels

The introduction and rapid expansion of solar technology has brought with it a number of occupational hazards for workers responsible for panel installation. Guidelines for safe solar panel installation exist, however the injuries related to panel installation are poorly quantified.

There is concern for long term health effects acquired from prolonged ultraviolet radiation and from lifting heavy panels. The lack of data regarding these concerns makes increasing awareness for worker safety more challenging.

== Exposures and health effects ==
With regard to PV occupational safety, there are differing exposures depending on the stage of involvement in Solar energy production. This can be broken down into four stages. Exposures and their impacts on worker health intricately depend on the PV life-cycle stage, as well as depth and duration of system involvement by the individual.

There is a wide variety of tasks required by the PV industry. These include scientists and engineers for material development, workers who pilot manufacturing facilities, miners and millers, factory manufacturers, power electronics, planners, developers, installation crews who work with electrical grids, transportation jobs, and recycling industry.

=== Raw material mining and processing ===
Hazards in this stage are mainly chemical in nature. They include crystalline silicon, amorphous silicon thin film, cadmium telluride thin film, copper indium selenide, copper indium gallium selenide, and gallium arsenide. These are highly toxic and flammable; hazardous exposures can come via chemical burns, explosions, and inhalation of gaseous fumes. Other routes can include hand-to-mouth contact or accidental ingestion. Most solar cells start as quartz, which is later refined into elemental silicon, which risks lung disease silicosis amongst miners.

=== Construction and assembly ===
During the manufacturing process, workers are exposed to a variety of toxic chemicals. Some of these chemicals such as telluride, cadmium telluride, gallium, and germanium are still under study. Other chemicals like chlorosilanes and hydrogen chloride are not only toxic but highly volatile and explosive when mixed with water.

In crystalline silicon solar cell production, workers may be exposed to hydrofluoric acid, or other acids and alkalis used for cleaning purposes, dopant gases and vapors (POCl_{3}, B_{2}H_{6}) due to improper ventilation, or the flammable nature of silane and byproducts from silicon nitride deposition and fabrication of x-Si layers. Other fire-hazard risks arise from the use of extremely flammable SiH_{4} gas. Exposure to cadmium compounds can be carcinogenic, as Cd is considered a lung carcinogen and is regulated by OSHA.

=== Installation/operation ===
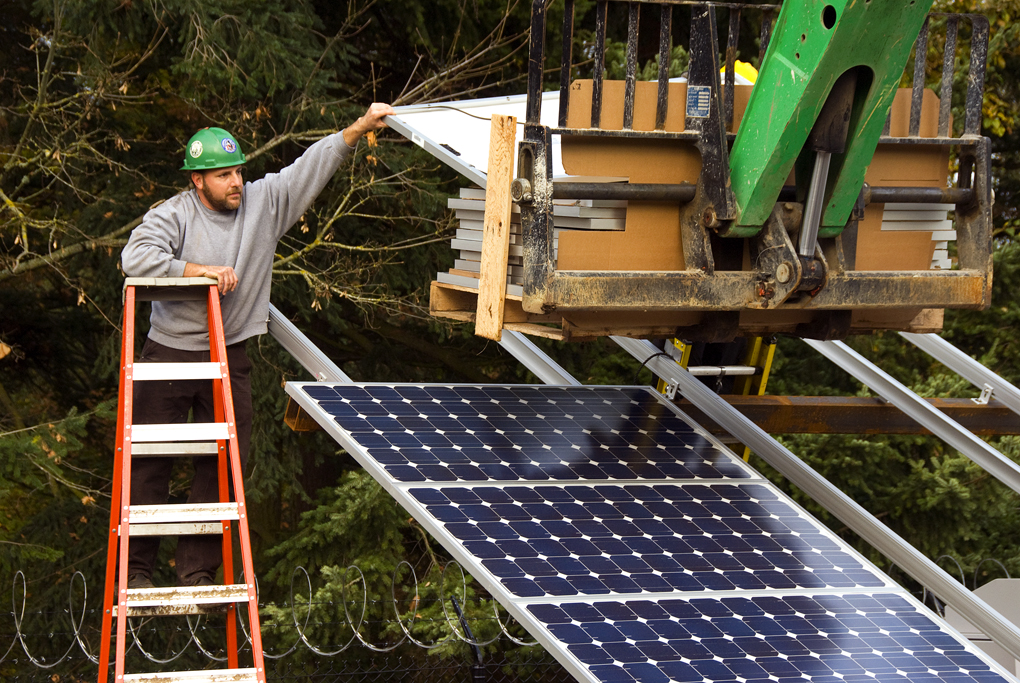
Installing solar panels

Falls from heights are a significant risk for panel installers. Fatal falls from the installation phase have been reported from California and in France. Health effects associated with falls from roofs include, but are not limited to: skeletomuscular injuries, brain or spine injuries, concussions, lacerations, bruising, swelling, long-term disability, and/or mortality.

Falls are more likely when roofing is old or damaged, or when panels are located close to edges, skylights, and vegetation. Other injury factors include lack of fall protection, proximity to overhead power lines, and unguarded skylights. It has been argued that incorporating PV technology into roof membranes, roof shingles, wall panels, or windows would reduce fall risk.

Installation effectively combines three high risk industries in one: roofing, carpentry, and electrical work. There is a risk of electrocution from installation or nearby power lines, as well as ergonomic risks from heavy loads or a lack of lifting equipment. Cold or heat stress and sun exposure can also occur.

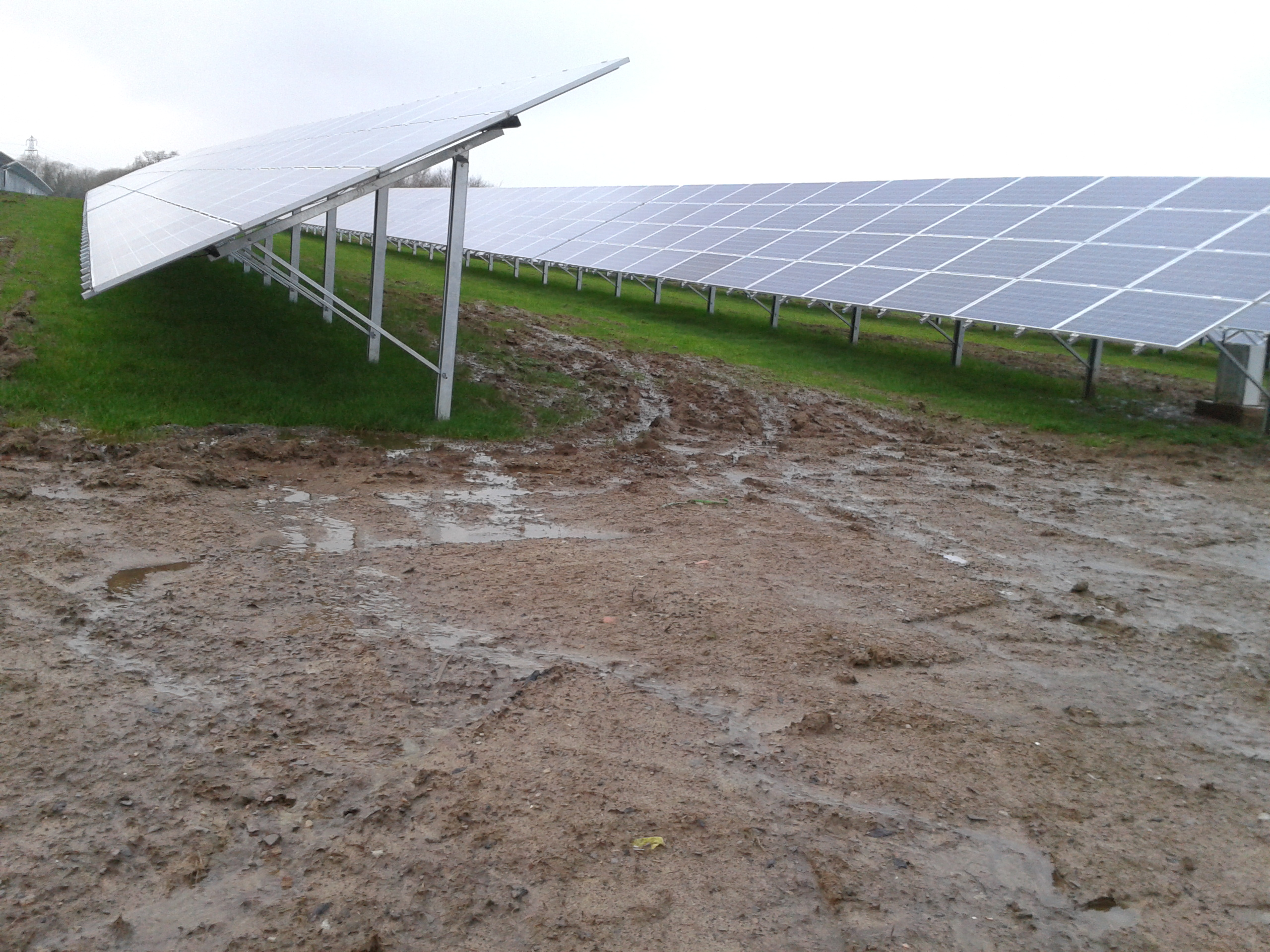
Solar Farm

There may also be a risk for infectious disease spread amongst PV employees. Solar farm construction requires soil-disruptive work, which can precipitate exposure to soil-dwelling organisms. Such cases have been documented in San Luis Obispo County, California between 2011-2014, where 44 workers came down with coccidioidomycosis while constructing solar power-generating facilities. Coccidioidomycosis (or "Valley Fever") is an infection caused by Coccidioides fungus spores and causes flu-like symptoms, as well as more serious complications such as meningitis, osteomyelitis, or cutaneous lesions. These can be fatal if not treated. In response to these isolated cases, the California Department of Public Health issued numerous recommendations, including improved worksite dust-control measures, equipping earth-moving equipment with high-efficiency particulate air (HEPA) filters, and respiratory protection for workers such as respirators with specialized particulate filters.

Occupational hazards may be exacerbated in settings with fewer worker protection policies in place, disproportionately affecting vulnerable populations. PV manufacturing has moved from Europe, Japan, and the U.S. to countries such as China, Malaysia, the Philippines, and Taiwan, with nearly half of the world's photovoltaics made in China as of 2014.

=== End of life and recycling ===
End-of-life recycling is also a source of hazardous chemical exposures for workers. Green recycling requires increased material handling and manual separation, which can demand two to three times more individual handing of materials. This can present a risk for strains, sprains, and punctures.

PV end-of-life materials can include lead from electronic circuits, as well as brominated flame retardants (BFRs), polybrominated biphenyls (PBBs), and polybrominated diphenylethers (PBDEs) used in circuit boards and solar panel inverters. These are considered toxic and potential estrogen disrupters, as PBDEs bioaccumulate in fatty tissues.

=== Other hazards ===
Many solar PV technologies use extremely toxic material that have unknown health and environmental consequences including new nano-materials and processes. There is limited data on specific air emissions and liquid or solid effluents from PV cells and processing.

== Policy ==
Research is currently underway exploring the possibility of replacing a number of the more hazardous chemicals workers are exposed to, such as cadmium and hydrofluoric acid, with less toxic chemicals.

Regarding policies related to solar panel installation, OSHA requires employers to implement and provide safety training for workers, including information on how to assess the worksite for potential hazards, safely perform required action such as heavy lifting, and what to do should an accident occur. This type of protection falls on the tip of on the hierarchy of controls as the least effective measure to ensure the safety of workers.

Hierarchy of Controls (By NIOSH)

In recent years the National Institute for Occupational Safety and Health launched the Prevention through Design (PtD) initiative. This initiative strives to improve the health and safety of workers by taking a comprehensive approach to eliminate hazards and control risks earlier in the process.

In 2013, SEIA introduced the Solar Industry Environmental & Social Responsibility Commitment, a voluntary set of guidelines for the solar industry. Companies can choose to sign and agree to adhere to general best practices, including those for worker safety.
