= List of La Comédie humaine characters =

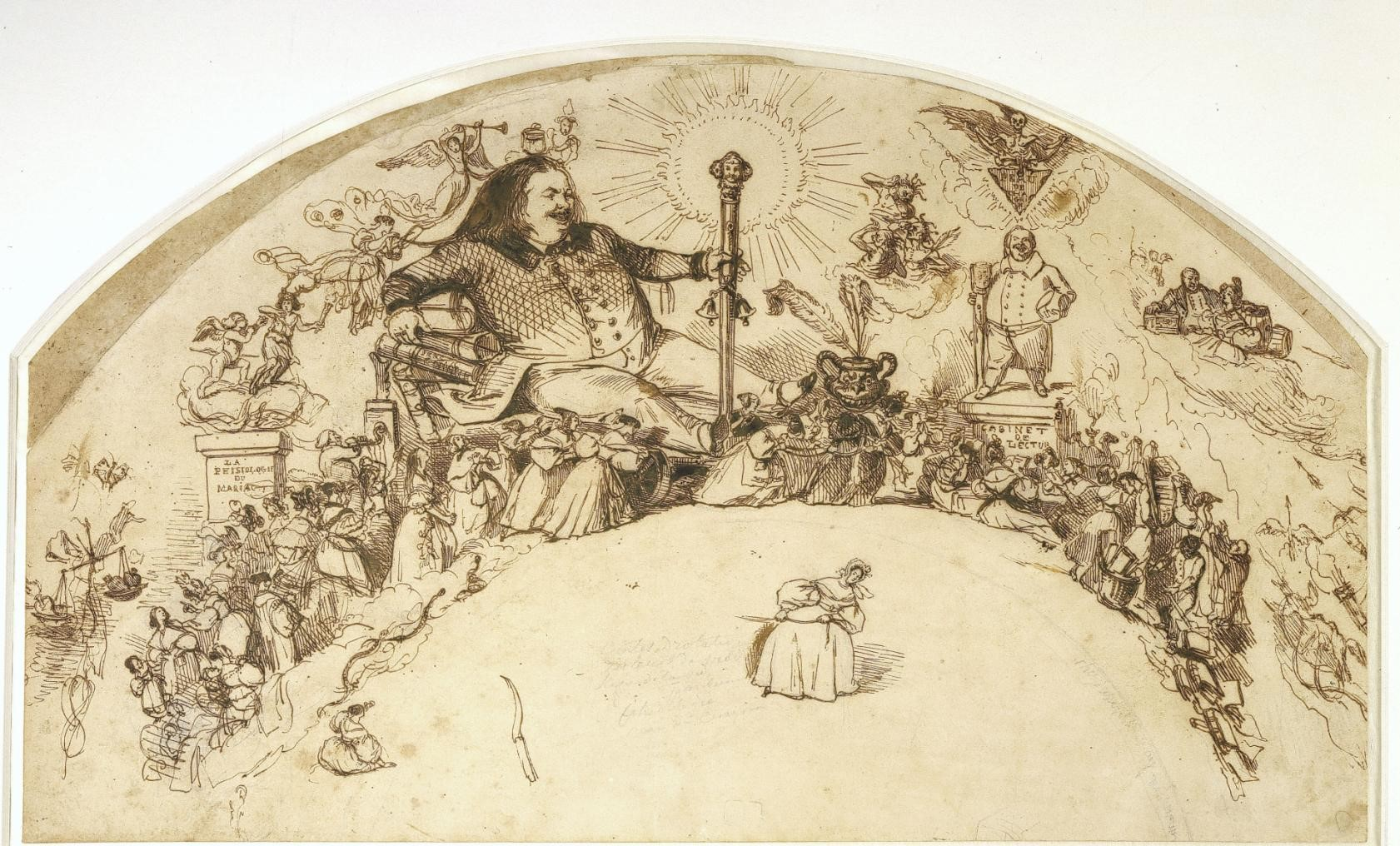
Honoré de Balzac, surrounded by characters from his novels; drawing by Grandville

The following is a list of characters from La Comédie humaine a collection of 95 loosely connected novels satirically detailing the life and times of French society in the period after the fall of Napoleon Bonaparte (1769-1821)—namely the period of the Restoration (1815–1830) and the July Monarchy (1830–1848). French novelist and playwright Honoré de Balzac (1799-1850), over the course of these novels, invents a plethora of unique and memorable characters.

An encyclopedia of all of the Comédie's characters was published as Repertory Of The Comedie Humaine, written by Anatole Cerfberr and Jules François Christophe.

== Major characters ==
=== Recurring characters ===
- Eugène de Rastignac - student, dandy, financier, politician (appears in 28 works)
- Lucien Chardon de Rubempré (the use of "de Rubempré" is contested) - journalist, parvenu
- Jacques Colin a.k.a. Carlos Herrera a.k.a. Vautrin a.k.a. Trompe-la-Mort - a criminal run away from hard labour
- Camusot - examining magistrate (The Collection of Antiquities, A Commission in Lunacy, Scenes from a Courtesan's Life; his father also appears in A Distinguished Provincial at Paris)
- Blondet, Emile - journalist, man of letters, prefect (The Collection of Antiquities, A Distinguished Provincial at Paris, Scenes from a Courtesan's Life). Compare and contrast with Raoul Nathan.
- Raoul Nathan - in 19 works, writer, politician
- Daniel d'Arthez
- Delphine de Nucingen née Goriot
- Roger de Granville
- Louis Lambert
- la duchesse de Langeais
- la comtesse de Mortsauf
- Jean-Jacques Bixiou - in 19 works, artist
- Joseph Bridau - in 13 works, painter
- Marquis de Ronquerolles - in 20 works
- la comtesse Hugret de Sérisy - in 20 works
- Félix-Amédée de Vandenesse
- Horace Bianchon - in 24 works, doctor
- des Lupeaulx - public servant
- Salon leaders: the Duchesse de Maufrigneuse, the Marquise d'Espard
- Dandies: Maxime de Trailles, Henri de Marsay
- Courtesans: La Torpille (Esther van Gobseck), Madame du Val-Noble
- Financiers: Ferdinand du Tillet, Frédérick de Nucingen (a thin fictionalization of James Rothschild), Keller brothers
- Actresses: Florine (Sophie Grignault), Coralie,
- Publishers/Journalists/Critics: Finot, Etienne Lousteau, Felicien Vernou
- Money lenders: Jean-Esther van Gobseck, Bidault a.k.a. Gigonnet

Characters who appear in several titles but only significantly in one of them.

- Birotteau
- Goriot

=== Characters in a single volume ===
- Raphaël de Valentin
- le baron Hulot
- Balthazar Claës
- Grandet
- le cousin Pons

== Heraldry ==
Balzac created fictional coats of arms for many of the characters in the novels. They have later been illustrated and collected in the Armorial de la Comédie Humaine (1963).
