= Health and safety hazards of 3D printing =

As three-dimensional printing becomes more common in our world, users express concerns for hazards associated with the practice. With over 7 different types of these additive manufacturing methods, each can come with their own subset of hazards, while also having hazards they may have in common such as VOC emissions while printing, post processing chemicals or machining, and more.

== Common types of printing ==
As 3D printing has evolved and progressed over the years, newer and more diverse methods of printing have been employed, depending on the desired final product or materials available. The following are the most common methods that can be found both in the professional field and the public market.

- Binder jetting: Consists of two main components, liquid binder and ceramic/metal powder. As the binder agent is sprayed, the powders solidify and are then heated to remove the binder and cement the remaining material.
- Directed energy deposition (DED): Similar to fused deposition modeling, but uses a metal powder or wire, which melts as the print head deposits it.
- Fused deposition modeling: Filament is heated up and melted to then be layered by a fine tip nozzle (most common in open markets).
- Material jetting: Use of small quantities of ink as feed material, which is placed onto a platform. As droplets solidify, the following layer begins to be placed.
- Powder bed fusion: Materials such as plastic, metal, ceramic, and glass powders are layered by lasers or other high-energy sources to solidify into a structure.
- Sheet lamination: Cuts and bonds thin materials like paper and aluminum foil by using a laser or a sharp blade.
- Stereolithography (SLA): A UV laser is used on photopolymer resin to harden and shape the object layer by layer.

== Hazards ==
=== Emissions ===
As the industry expands and transforms, 3D printing's advancements have been both technical and commercial. Beginning to be adopted around the world inside classrooms, medical institutions, orthodontist offices, and private residences, potential risks are ever more increasing.

Emissions from fused filament printers can include a large number of ultrafine particles and volatile organic compounds (VOCs). The toxicity from emissions varies by source material due to differences in size, chemical properties, and quantity of emitted particles. Excessive exposure to VOCs can lead to irritation of the eyes, nose, and throat, headaches, cancer, and damage to the liver, kidneys, and central nervous system, while some of the chemical emissions of fused filament printers have also been linked to asthma. Based on animal studies, carbon nanotubes and carbon nanofibers sometimes used in fused filament printing can cause pulmonary effects, including inflammation, granulomas, and pulmonary fibrosis when at the nanoparticle size. A National Institute for Occupational Safety and Health (NIOSH) study noted particle emissions from a fused filament peaked a few minutes after printing started and returned to baseline levels 100 minutes after printing ended. Workers may also inadvertently transport materials outside the workplace on their shoes, garments, and bodies, potentially posing hazards for other members of the public.

Laser sintering and laser beam melting systems for additive manufacturing have become more important recently. The Institute for Occupational Safety and Health (IFA) together with German social accident insurance institutions conducted a measurement program on inhalation exposure to hazardous substances during laser deposition welding and laser beam melting with alloyed steels and nickel-, aluminium- and titanium-based alloys. No chromium(VI) compounds were detected in the workplace air during the process when materials containing chromium were processed, and the assessment criteria were complied with during processes with the other metal powders. One reason for this is that the machines are usually operated with encapsulation or dust extraction in order to achieve the required product quality. Since many work steps before and after the process (including the handling of powder itself or powdered parts) are performed manually or semi-automatically, there are huge effects on the degree of inhalation exposure and the measured values vary broadly. It is therefore difficult to derive tailored measures for these processes.

Carbon nanoparticle emissions and processes using powder metals are highly combustible and raise the risk of dust explosions. Two especially hazardous nanometals are aluminum an titanium, both of which are widely used in metal powder 3D printing processes. At least one case of severe injury was noted from an explosion involving metal powders used for fused filament printing.

=== Post-processing ===
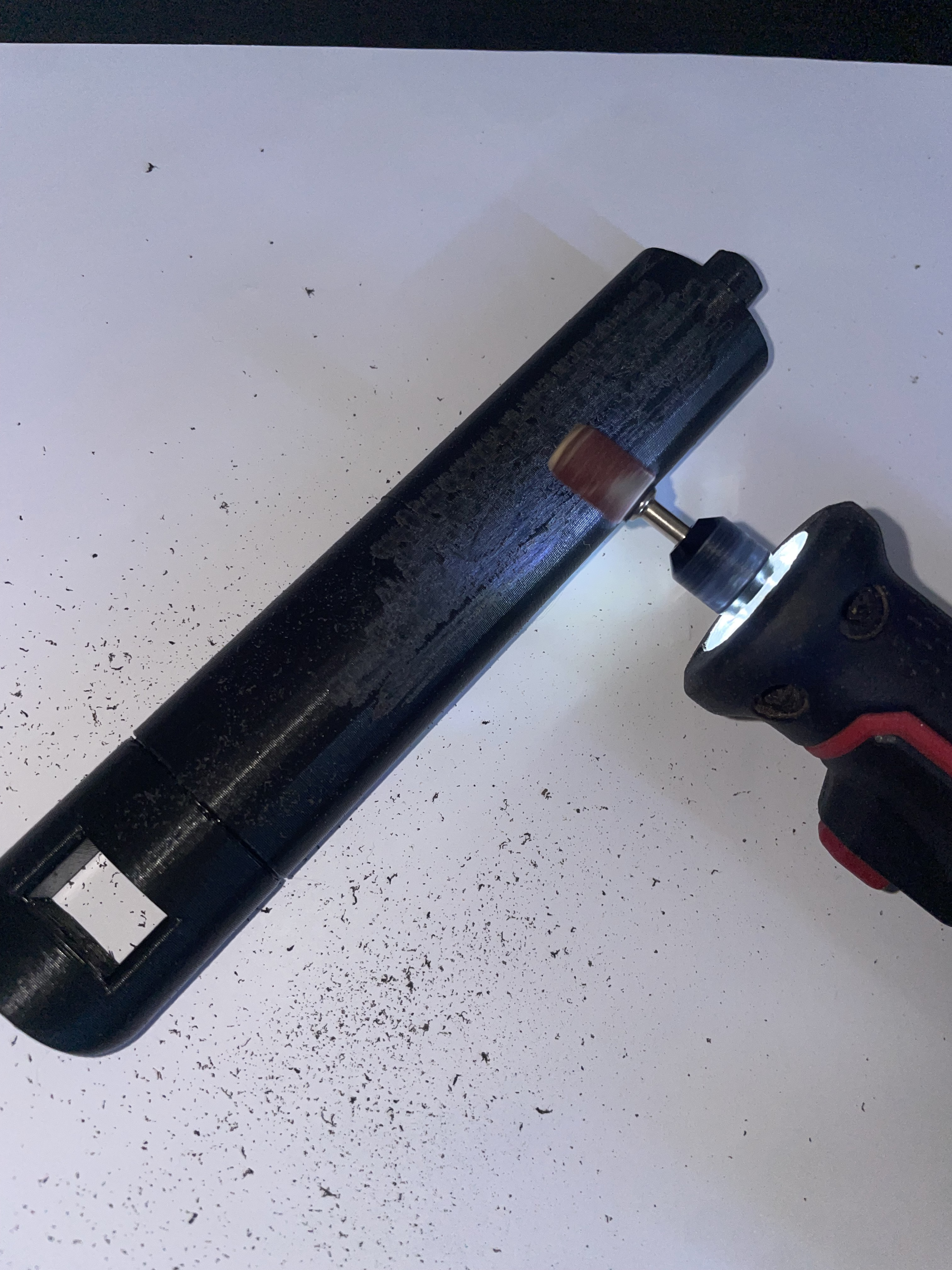
3D printed object being sanded using a hand-rotary tool. This post-processing creates fine particulates that permeate in the air and can be inhaled.

Hazards to health and safety also exist from post-processing activities done to finish parts after they have been printed. These post-processing activities can include chemical baths, sanding, polishing, or exposing parts to a vapor bath to refine surface finish through smoothing/polishing using solvent chemicals. Other post-processing can also include general subtractive manufacturing techniques such as drilling, milling, or turning to modify the printed geometry. Any technique that removes material from the printed part has the potential to generate particles that can be inhaled or cause eye injury if proper personal protective equipment is not used, such as respirators or safety glasses. Caustic baths are often used to dissolve support material used by some 3D printers, which allows more complex shapes to be made. These baths require personal protective equipment to prevent injury to exposed skin.

=== Other ===
Additional hazards include burns from hot surfaces such as lamps and print head blocks, exposure to laser or ultraviolet radiation, electrical shock, mechanical injury from being struck by moving parts, noise, ergonomic hazards, and now even lasers that can damage eyes or skin. Other concerns involve gas and material exposures (in particular nanomaterials), material handling, static electricity, moving parts, and pressures.

In some cases, printers employ the use of inert gases such as argon or nitrogen to form a noncombustible zone within the printing chamber. If said gases are exposed to the outer atmosphere, within a room, oxygen can be removed, and asphyxiation becomes a new hazard.

Since 3D printing creates items by fusing materials together, there runs the risk of layer separation in some devices made using 3D printing. Similar problems occurred at the beginning of 2013 when DePuy, a company based in the US whom specializes in medical devices, had to recall a line of knee and hip replacement systems. Similar to 3D printed objects, their devices were made of metal layers stacked together; however, this was a point of failure and potential harm to patients using these devices as shavings had formed and come loose from the layers.

== Hazard controls ==
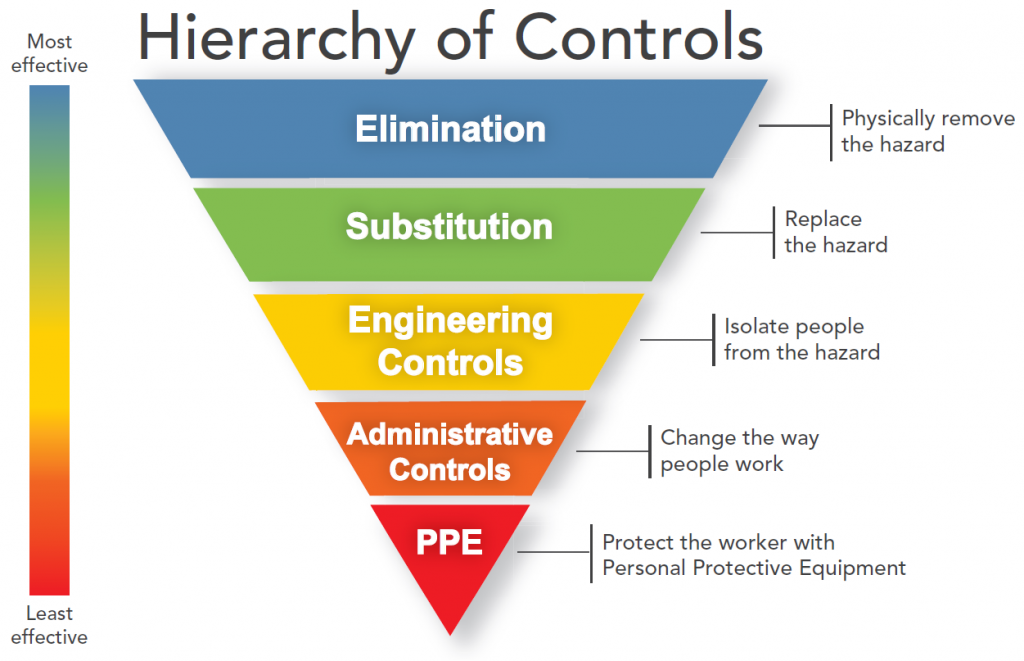
The Hierarchy of Controls according to NIOSH, showing descriptions and effectiveness of each layer on the pyramid.

Using the hierarchy of controls, the best method of control is elimination or substitution. When the possibility presents itself, less harmful materials should be used. For example, using Polylactic Acid (PLA) filament rather than acrylonitrile butadiene styrene (ABS) filament in fused deposition modeling. Engineering and administrative controls like particulate air filters, proper ventilation near printers, risk management plans, and proper employee/user training are also good mitigation techniques. Personal Protective Equipment (PPE) is often used as a last resort as it is the least effective control, but may involve eye protection, chemical and thermal resistant gloves, and respiratory protection.

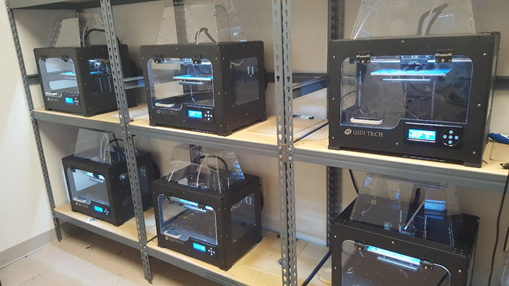
3D printers with the manufacturer-provided plastic covers and doors installed, which are examples of engineering controls

With older hazard controls such as manufacturer-supplied covers and full enclosures, using proper ventilation, keeping workers away from the printer, using respirators, turning off the printer if it jams, and using lower emission printers and filaments remains useful as well.

== Health regulation ==
Although no occupational exposure limits specific to 3D printer emissions exist, certain source materials used in 3D printing, such as carbon nanofiber and carbon nanotubes, have established occupational exposure limits at the nanoparticle size.

As of January 2026, the National Institute for Occupational Safety and Health (NIOSH) published an updated set of recommendations as to how 3D printing can be safely used by anyone. The updated standards covered updated health risks found as well as proper precautions that personal users, employers, small business, and even schools can take to prevent harm.

== See also ==
- 3D printer cabinet, encapsulation that can provide better control of the environment around a 3D printer
- Automatic fire suppression, fire suppression systems that operate without human control
- Thermal runaway, potential fire hazard of 3D printer hotends
