= Health hazards in semiconductor manufacturing occupations =

Health hazards in semiconductor manufacturing occupations are a major issue of occupational hygiene due to the chemical hazards required to produce semiconductors in the semiconductor industry. The manifestations of exposure to health hazards during the production process often occurs at a low level and the effects of the toxins may take decades to surface.

- Use of toxic materials such as arsine, phosphine and others potentially expose workers to health hazards which include cancer, miscarriages and birth defects.
- Protective gear issued to workers protects the products and process from contamination by workers but is not designed to protect workers from contamination by the process, products and materials.
- The use of vast variety of toxic chemicals in semiconductor manufacturing makes it difficult to evaluate or pin-point the possibilities of contamination.
- There is comparatively extremely low rate of physical accidents in the semiconductor industry.
- Semiconductor industry has been ranked the top 5% for workplace health and safety among U.S. companies since 1972.

A Scientific Advisory Committee funded by the Semiconductor Industry Association concluded there was no evidence of increased cancer risk to cleanroom workers, although it could not rule out the possibility that circumstances might exist that could result in increased risk.

== Impacts of Health Hazards in Semiconductor Manufacturing on Women ==
Historically, semiconductor fabrication and the production roles involved in creating integrated circuits have often been the role of women. In the 1980s, it was estimated that 68% of tech production jobs (including semiconductor production) were performed by women. In Southeast Asia, one of the largest producers of semiconductors in the world, over 90% of the production jobs were said to be filled by women during this period. Today, the trend of women dominating production roles in the semiconductor industry continues.

Semiconductor fabrication, as previously stated, has a number of adverse impacts on workers' health. However, these effects are realized to a greater extent in female workers then with men. Digital Equipment, one American producer of semiconductors, found that women working in its factories had twice the chance of experiencing a miscarriage as compared to the general population. Subsequently, Bloomberg reported that the parent company behind Digital Equipment initially pledged to remove the teratogens from their manufacturing processes, however instead decided to outsource production to factories abroad where the regulations and public pressure for the use of these chemicals was less significant. Semiconductor producers continually subvert occupational safety and health regulations by operating abroad in countries where these regulations are lax and even nonexistent, which ultimately occurs at the detriment of the primarily female workers producing the chips.

Many semiconductor fabrication plants are associated with causing loss of eyesight and degradation of vision capabilities in workers. One plant in Hong Kong in the 1970s reported that workers over age 25 were called "Grandma" as they were the most susceptible to eyesight damage from the toxic chemicals involved in semiconductor fabrication. These health impacts can often cause workers to leave semiconductor production jobs earlier than expected, yet unable to easily find other jobs after they fully experience the health impacts of semiconductor fabrication in the first place.
