= IKEA Lack =

Table manufactured by IKEA

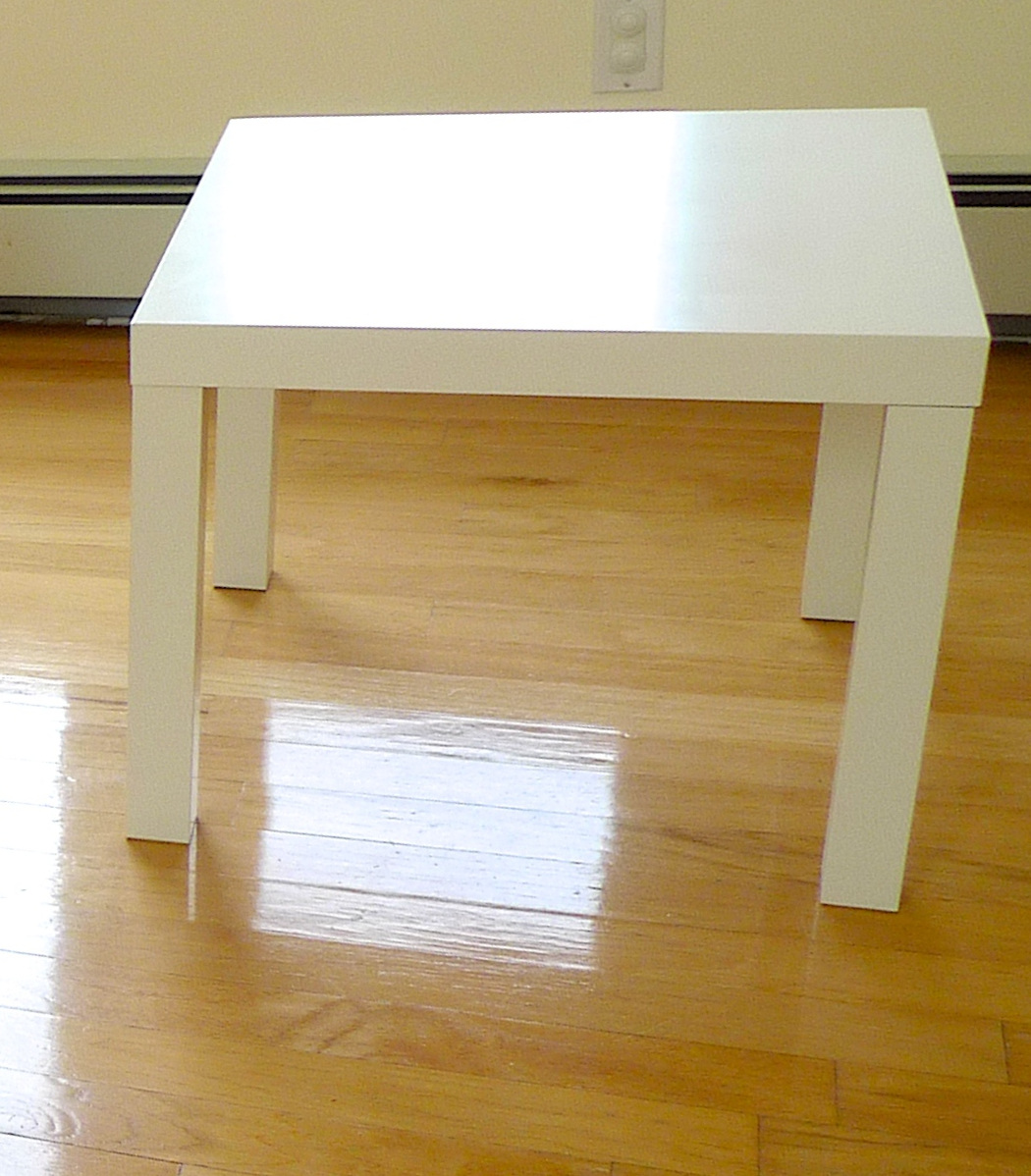
The IKEA Lack table in white

The Lack (stylized as LACK) is a table manufactured by IKEA since 1981. It has not undergone any major visual changes since then.

== Modifications ==
Various third-party modifications to the product have been published. They include:

- The Lackrack, a 19-inch rack
- Dog table and other table customizations
- Closet (by stacking LACK tables)
- Enclosure for 3D printing
