= Multi-jet fusion =

3D printing by fusing powder in layers

Multi-jet fusion (MJF) is a type of 3D printing technology developed by Hewlett-Packard (HP). It works by depositing powder in layers, spraying it with a fusing and detailing agent, and then bonding it together with heat for each layer pass. Similar to other types of 3D printing, the technology is particularly suitable for prototyping in product development, small-scale production, or parts that need to be customized.

MJF is marketed as having strength comparable to injection molding. The most common material in MJF is nylon (PA12 and PA11), but the technology can be used with many other thermoplastic materials, including elastomers ("rubber materials") and fibre-reinforced composites. The technology is claimed to be more cost-effective at large scale compared to other types of 3D printing.

== History ==
In 2013, HP announced that it would enter the 3D printing market in 2014. In 2016, it introduced Multi Jet Fusion. In 2021, it was claimed that HP held around 100 patents related to MJF technology.

== Operation ==
The printer distributes a powder (usually nylon) in thin layers over a build surface, and between each layer, two types of liquids, namely a fusing agent and a detailing agent, are sprayed onto the newly applied layer of powder using an inkjet. After the liquids are applied, a heat source (often infrared light) passes over the layer, which bonds the powder particles together into a solid layer. The next layer of powder is then applied on top of the previous one, and the process is repeated without the need for additional support structures since the surrounding powder provides the necessary support. Finally, the parts must be cooled and cleaned of excess powder. The result is claimed to often have better surface quality straight from the printer compared to fused filament fabrication (FFF).

== See also ==
- Fused filament fabrication (FFF), printing technology based on melting of thermoplastics
- Selective laser sintering (SLS), printing technology based on melting metal powder with a laser
- Stereolithography, printing technology based on photopolymerizable resin
- Powder bed fusion
