= Asthmagen =

Substance that is causally-related to the development of asthma

An asthmagen is a substance that can cause asthma in exposed people. Workplace asthmagens induce what is called occupational asthma. A 2016 study of occupational asthmagens in Australia identified 277 in 27 groups, including ammonia, latex, pesticides and wood dust.

== Common asthmagens ==
Some of the more common asthmagens include: solder fumes, welding fumes, hard metal dust/fumes (e.g. cobalt), metal-working fluids, oil mists, wood dusts (both hard and soft), isocyanates (e.g., footwear and textiles, printing, cellular plastics, rubber and spraying isocyanate paint in MVR), formaldehyde, glutaraldehyde, anhydrides (epoxy resins, printing inks, plastic/rubber), azodicarbonamide (plastics and rubber), latex, glues, dyes, laboratory animals, molds, cleaning materials, flour and grain dusts and other agriculture dusts.

== See also ==
- Carcinogen
- Mutagen
- Particulates
