= Kit (components) =

A kit is a set of components that has to be assembled by the buyer or at the site of use to get the definitive product.

Examples:

- Electronic kit, a package of electrical components used to build an electronic device.
- Kit car ("component car"), an automobile that the buyer assembles into a functioning car
- Kit bike
- Folding kayak
- Tent
- Prefabricated building of houses
- provisional military engineering constructions like
  - Mabey Logistic Support Bridge
- Space station
- Much of IKEA furniture
- A lot of kits are sold for model building
