= Occupational toxicology =

Toxiciology of substances found in workplaces

Occupational toxicology is the application of toxicology to chemical hazards in the workplace. It focuses on substances and conditions that people may be exposed to in workplaces, including inhalation and dermal exposures, which are most prevalent when discussing occupational toxicology. These environmental and individual exposures can impact health, and there is a focus on identifying early adverse effects that are more subtle than those presented in clinical medicine.

Occupational toxicology interfaces heavily with other subfields of occupational safety and health. Occupational epidemiology studies may inspire toxicological study of causative agents, and toxicological investigations are important in establishing biomarkers for workplace health surveillance. Occupational toxicology studies may suggest or evaluate hazard controls used by industrial hygienists. Toxicological studies are also an important input for performing occupational risk assessment, and establishing standards and regulation such as occupational exposure limits.

== Background ==
As of 1983, around 60,000 chemical compounds were considered to be of occupational consequence. Certain sectors have an increased potential for exposure to chemical and biological agents, including manufacturing, construction, mining, logging, and agriculture, as well as service sector workplaces such as in automobile repair, gasoline stations, pipelines, truck and rail transportation, waste management and remediation, and botanical gardens. These sectors contain an increased risk of exposure largely due to the fact that they are working with heavy machinery that can emit potentially harmful fumes when being operated. Additionally, these sectors involve directly handling various substances that can possibly contain harmful chemical compounds.

Toxicological studies are experimental laboratory studies on the response of organisms and biological pathways to a substance, and can generate data that are used for other occupational safety and health activities. These studies can range anywhere from 2 weeks to 2 years and primarily focus on determining whether or not the compound is toxic/carcinogenic and how toxic it is if so. To discover if a compound is toxic/carcinogenic, toxicologists expose mice to the compound being studied and examine them over a given amount of time. These toxicologists then look for any patterns in the mice that may suggest toxicity or carcinogenicity and draw a conclusion from this data.

== Goals ==
Occupational toxicology generates data that is used to identify hazards and their physiological effects, and quantify dose–response relationships. A major use of this data is for establishing standards and regulation. These may take the form of occupational exposure limits, which are based on ambient concentration levels of toxicants. They also include biological exposure indices, which are based on biomonitoring of a toxicant, its metabolites, or other biomarkers. Toxicologists have a large role in determining what biomarkers may be used for biomonitoring during exposure assessment and workplace health surveillance activities.

Occupational toxicology is complementary to occupational epidemiology, to a greater degree than toxicology and epidemiology in general. For example, outbreaks identified through epidemiological studies such as exposure assessment case studies or workplace health surveillance may inspire toxicological study of suspected or confirmed causative agents. Conversely, the results of toxicological investigation are important in establishing biomarkers for workplace health surveillance to identify overexposure and to test the validity of occupational exposure limits. These biomarkers are intended to aid in prevention by identifying early adverse affects, unlike diagnostics for clinical medicine that are designed to reveal advanced pathological states.

Toxicological studies have the benefit over epidemiology that they can study new substances before there is exposure in commerce, or when epidemiological data are not available. Toxicology also has the advantage of elucidating not only overt health outcomes, but intermediate biochemical steps such as biotransformation processes, as well as early cellular changes. These can aid in developing measures to prevent or treat toxicity.

Occupational toxicology studies may also suggest or evaluate hazard controls used by industrial hygienists. Occupational toxicology differs from environmental toxicology in that the former has smaller number of exposed individuals, but with a wider range of exposure levels. Environmental toxicology tends to focus on situations with low exposure levels for larger numbers of people, where adverse effects may be concentrated in people who are especially susceptible to a given toxicant due to genetic or other factors.

== Challenges ==
Occupational toxicology has the challenge of performing studies that mimic actual workplace conditions, for which inhalation exposure and dermal exposure are most important, although in medical industries, injection exposure through needlestick injuries is a hazard. In particular, experimental inhalation exposure studies require more complex methodology and equipment than for oral administration experiments. For example, measurement and control of particle size distribution is important, and the degree and location of particle retention within the respiratory tract. Inhalation and injection exposure are often more dangerous than dermal exposure, where a major function of skin is to provide a barrier to outside toxins, and ingestion exposure, where toxins may be broken down by the gastrointestinal tract and liver.

There is often exposure to mixtures of chemicals, whose effects may not be simply additive, as different toxins may interact in a way that enhances or reduces their toxicity relative to each toxin alone. Mixtures may include undesired contaminants in a product, or products that deviate from manufacturer specifications. Exposures are not always acute, but may be at low levels prolonged over decades. Workers may be exposed to toxic substances at higher levels than the general public, who are mainly exposed through consumer products and the environment. Establishing a causal relationship between a worker's illness and work conditions is often difficult because work-related illnesses are often indistinguishable from those with other causes, and there may be a long interval between the exposure and the onset of disease.

While the dose of a toxicant is a strong predictor of health outcomes, occupational diseases are often influenced or confounded by other environmental factors, or personal host factors such as preexisting health conditions, host genetics, or patterns of worker behavior. These affect the relationship between the concentration, duration, and frequency of the exposure, and the actual toxicant dose that reaches a target tissue and interacts with metabolic processes. For example, the ultimate dose from inhalation exposure depends on respiratory rate and breathing volume, and the dose from dermal exposure depends on the absorption rate through the skin, which is influenced by the chemical properties of the chemical, the thickness of the skin at the exposed location on the body, and whether the skin is intact.

== Methods ==
Occupational toxicology uses methods common to other forms of toxicology. Animal testing is used to identify adverse effects and establish acceptable exposure levels, as well as studying the mechanism of action and dose–response relationship. There are a number of in vitro alternatives to animal testing in a number of specific cases such as predicting skin sensitizers and potential for eye injuries, as well as quantitative structure–activity relationship models. Sometimes, controlled human challenge studies are performed in cases where the risk for volunteers is negligible; these are used to verify whether results from animal studies translate to humans.

Many types of measurements may be made in occupational toxicology. These include external measurements of exposure, the internal dose measured via tissues and bodily fluids, the "biologically effective dose" measuring the compound that has actually interacted with host biomolecules such as DNA and proteins, and measuring downstream effects of mutations, cytogenetic effects, and aberrant gene expression. Experimentation may focus on the operation and regulation of biotransformation processes that may detoxify or activate toxins. These processes are subject to difference between individuals, which is studied through the field of toxicogenomics.

== History ==
While the health hazards of substances used in the workplace have been recognized since antiquity, the first experimental studies of hazardous substances came in the late 19th and early 20th centuries, including the work of John Scott Haldane on mine gases, Karl Bernhard Lehmann on organic substances, and Ernest Kennaway on occupational skin cancer.

Biomarkers began to be used in occupational toxicology and epidemiology in the 1970s, and the 1990s showed increasing focus on molecular mechanisms such as identifying specific enzymes that interact with toxicants and studying their variation across individuals.

== See also ==
- Nanotoxicology
- Neurotoxicology
- Ototoxicity
- Risk assessement
- Toxicogenomics
- Toxicology
