= Environmental factor =

Any factor, whether abiotic or biotic, that influences living organisms in an ecosystem

An environmental factor, ecological factor or eco factor is any factor, abiotic or biotic, that influences living organisms. Abiotic factors include ambient temperature, amount of sunlight, air, soil, water and pH of the water soil in which an organism lives. Biotic factors would include the availability of food organisms and the presence of biological specificity, competitors, predators, and parasites.

Harmful factors are considered environmental hazards.

== Overall ==
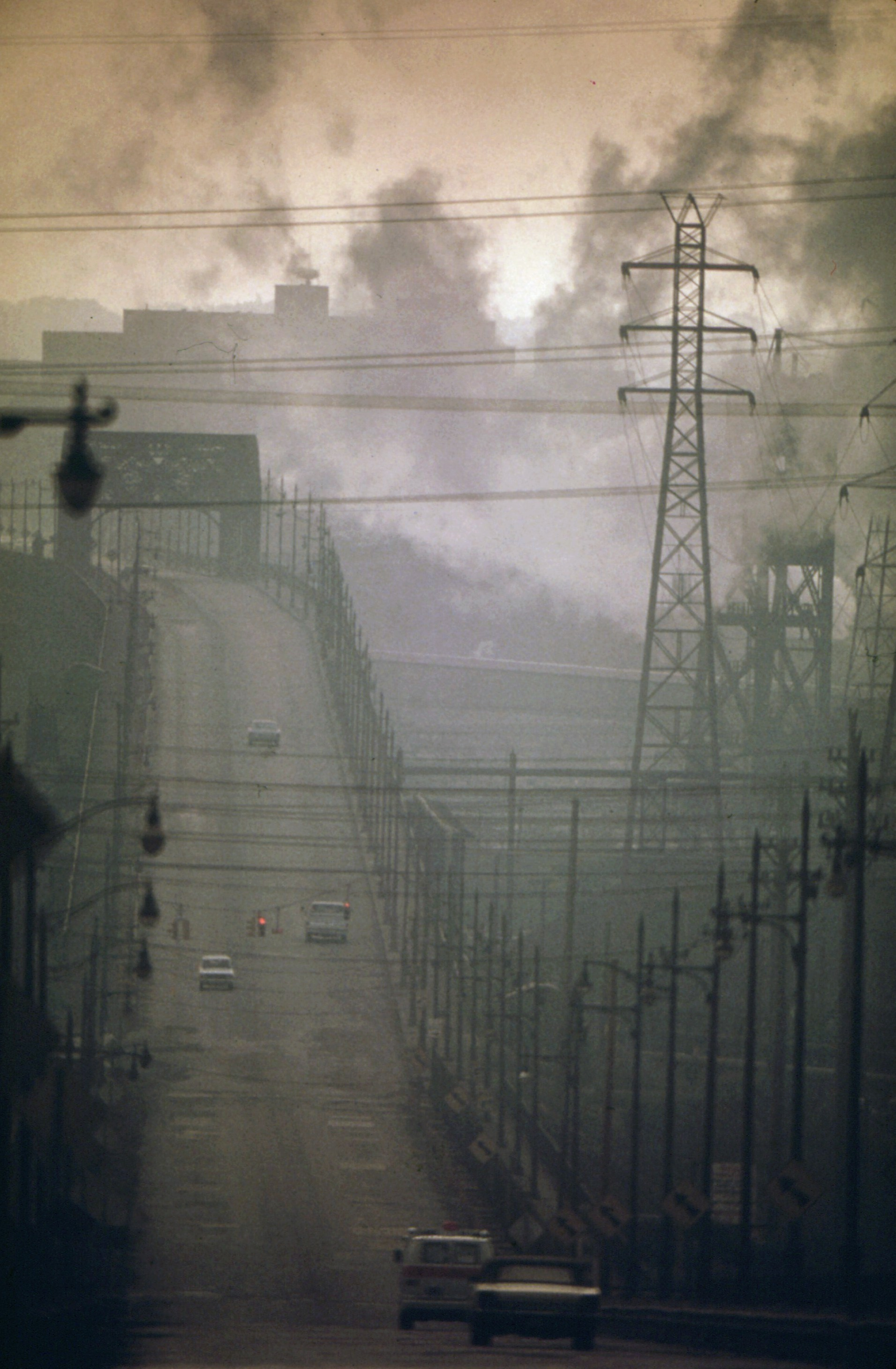
Cancer is mainly the result of environmental factors

An organism's genotype (e.g., in the zygote) translated into the adult phenotype through development during an organism's ontogeny, and subject to influences by many environmental effects. In this context, a phenotype (or phenotypic trait) can be viewed as any definable and measurable characteristic of an organism, such as its body mass or skin color.

Apart from the true monogenic genetic disorders, environmental factors may determine the development of disease in those genetically predisposed to a particular condition. Pollution, stress, physical and mental abuse, diet, exposure to toxins, pathogens, radiation and chemicals found in almost all personal-care products and household cleaners are common environmental factors that determine a large segment of non-hereditary disease.

If a disease process is concluded to be the result of a combination of genetic and environmental factor influences, its etiological origin can be referred to as having a multifactorial pattern.

Cancer is often related to environmental factors. Maintaining a healthy weight, eating a healthy diet, minimizing alcohol and eliminating smoking reduces the risk of developing the disease, according to researchers.

Environmental triggers for asthma and autism have been studied too.

== Exposome ==
The exposome encompasses the set of human environmental (i.e. non-genetic) exposures from conception onwards, complementing the genome. The exposome was first proposed in 2005 by cancer epidemiologist Christopher Paul Wild in an article entitled "Complementing the genome with an "exposome": the outstanding challenge of environmental exposure measurement in molecular epidemiology". The concept of the exposome and how to assess it has led to lively discussions with varied views in 2010, 2012, 2014 and 2021.

In his 2005 article, Wild stated, "At its most complete, the exposome encompasses life-course environmental exposures (including lifestyle factors), from the prenatal period onwards." The concept was first proposed to draw attention to the need for better and more complete environmental exposure data for causal research, in order to balance the investment in genetics. According to Wild, even incomplete versions of the exposome could be useful to epidemiology. In 2012, Wild outlined methods, including personal sensors, biomarkers, and 'omics' technologies, to better define the exposome. He described three overlapping domains within the exposome:

1. a general external environment including the urban environment, education, climate factors, social capital, stress,
2. a specific external environment with specific contaminants, radiation, infections, lifestyle factors (e.g. tobacco, alcohol), diet, physical activity, etc.
3. an internal environment to include internal biological factors such as metabolic factors, hormones, gut microflora, inflammation, oxidative stress.

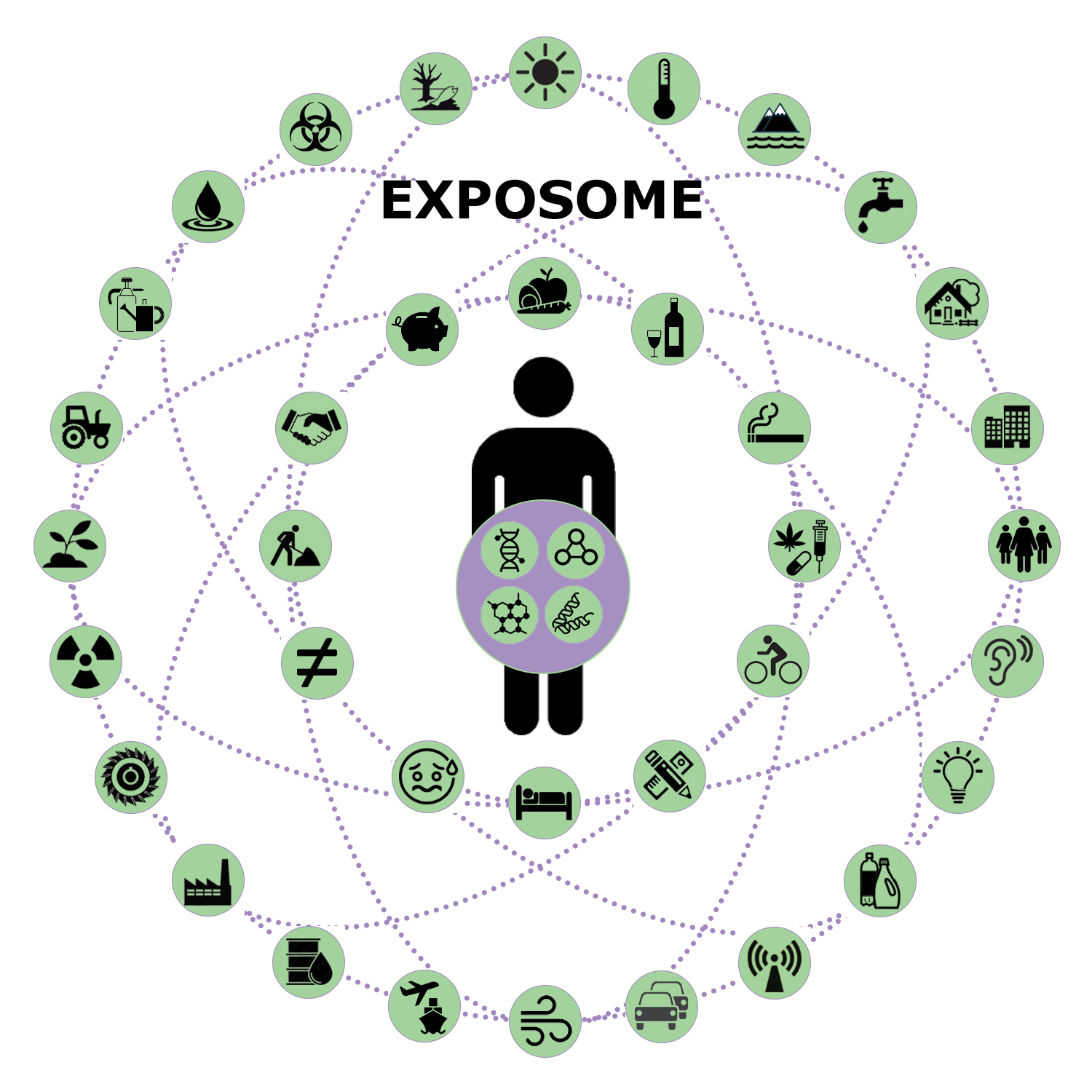
Exposome

In late 2013, this definition was explained in greater depth in the first book on the exposome. In 2014, the same author revised the definition to include the body's response with its endogenous metabolic processes which alter the processing of chemicals. More recently, evidenced by metabolic exposures in and around the time of pregnancy, the maternal metabolic exposome includes exposures such as maternal obesity/overweight and diabetes, and malnutrition, including high fat/high calorie diets, which are associated with poor fetal, infant and child growth, and increased incidence of obesity and other metabolic disorders in later life.

== Measurement ==
For complex disorders, specific genetic causes appear to account for only 10-30% of the disease incidence, but there has been no standard or systematic way to measure the influence of environmental exposures. Some studies into the interaction of genetic and environmental factors in the incidence of diabetes have demonstrated that "environment-wide association studies" (EWAS, or exposome-wide association studies) may be feasible. However, it is not clear what data sets are most appropriate to represent the value of "E".

== Research initiatives ==
As of 2016, it may not be possible to measure or model the full exposome, but several European projects have started to make first attempts. In 2012, the European Commission awarded two large grants to pursue exposome-related research. The HELIX project at the Barcelona-based Centre for Research in Environmental Epidemiology was launched around 2014, and aimed to develop an early-life exposome. A second project, Exposomics, based at Imperial College London, launched in 2012, aimed to use smartphones utilising GPS and environmental sensors to assess exposures.

In late 2013, a major initiative called the "Health and Environment-Wide Associations based on Large Scale population Surveys" or HEALS, began. Touted as the largest environmental health-related study in Europe, HEALS proposes to adopt a paradigm defined by interactions between DNA sequence, epigenetic DNA modifications, gene expression, and environmental factors.

In December 2011, the US National Academy of Sciences hosted a meeting entitled "Emerging Technologies for Measuring Individual Exposomes." A Centers for Disease Control and Prevention overview, "Exposome and Exposomics", outlines the three priority areas for researching the occupational exposome as identified by the National Institute for Occupational Safety and Health. The National Institutes of Health (NIH) has invested in technologies supporting exposome-related research including biosensors, and supports research on gene–environment interactions.

== Proposed Human Exposome Project (HEP) ==
The idea of a Human Exposome Project, analogous to the Human Genome Project, has been proposed and discussed in numerous scientific meetings, but as of 2017, no such project exists. Given the lack of clarity on how science would go about pursuing such a project, support has been lacking. Reports on the issue include:

- a 2011 review on the exposome and exposure science by Paul Lioy and Stephen Rappaport, "Exposure science and the exposome: an opportunity for coherence in the environmental health sciences" in the journal Environmental Health Perspectives.
- a 2012 report from the United States National Research Council "Exposure Science in the 21st Century: A Vision and A Strategy", outlining the challenges in systematic evaluations of the exposome.

== Related fields ==
The concept of the exposome has contributed to the 2010 proposal of a new paradigm in disease phenotype, "the unique disease principle": Every individual has a unique disease process different from any other individual, considering uniqueness of the exposome and its unique influence on molecular pathologic processes including alterations in the interactome. This principle was first described in neoplastic diseases as "the unique tumor principle". Based on this unique disease principle, the interdisciplinary field of molecular pathological epidemiology (MPE) integrates molecular pathology and epidemiology.

== Socioeconomic drivers ==
Global change is driven by many factors; however the five main drivers of global change are: population growth, economic growth, technological advances, attitudes, and institutions. These five main drivers of global change can stem from socioeconomic factors which in turn, these can be seen as drivers in their own regard. Socioeconomic drivers of climate change can be triggered by a social or economic demand for resources such as a demand for timber or a demand for agricultural crops. In tropical deforestation for instance, the main driver is economic opportunities that come the extraction of these resources and the conversion of this land to crop or rangelands. These drivers can be manifested at any level, from the global level demand for timber all the way to the household level.

An example of how socioeconomic drivers affect climate change can be seen in the soy bean trading between Brazil and China. The trading of soy beans from to Brazil and China has grown immensely in the past few decades. This growth in trade between these two countries is stimulated by socioeconomic drivers. Some of the socioeconomic drivers in play here are the rising demand for Brazilian soy beans in China, the increase in land use change for soy bean production in Brazil, and the importance of strengthening foreign trade between the two countries. All of these socioeconomic drivers have implications in climate change. For instance, an increase in the development for soy bean croplands in Brazil means there needs to be more and more land made available for this resource. This causes the general land cover of forest to be converted into croplands which in its own regard has an impact on the environment. This example of land use change driven by a demand of a resource, isn't only happening in Brazil with soy bean production.

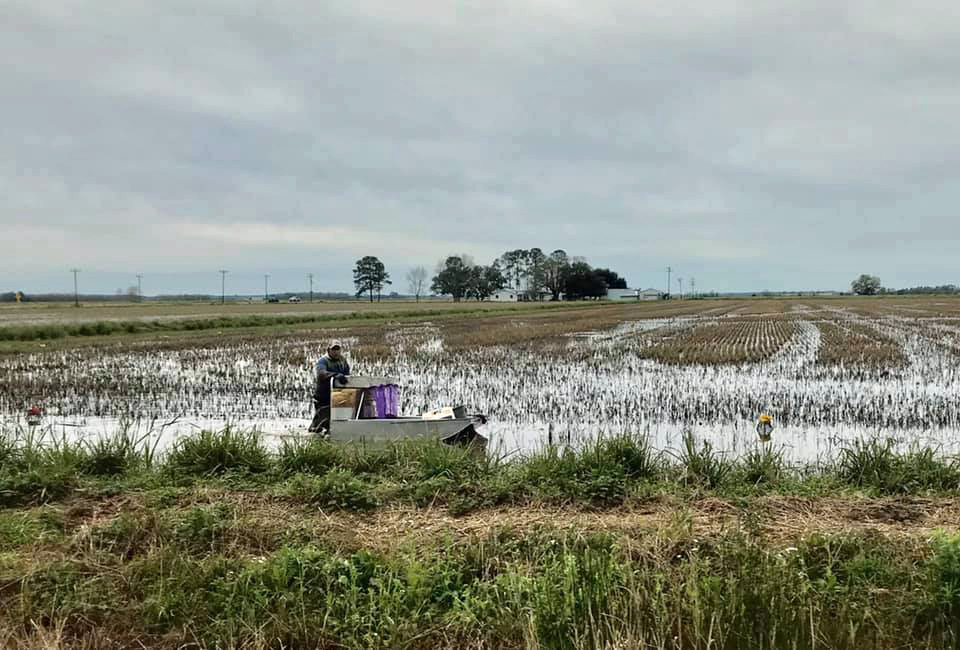
Harvesting crawfish in Acadia Parish, Louisiana.

Another example came from The Renewable Energy Directive 2009 Union when they mandated biofuel development for countries within their membership. With an international socioeconomic driver of increasing the production biofuels comes affects in land use in these countries. When agricultural cropland shift to bioenergy cropland the original crop supply decreases while the global market for this crop increases. This causes a cascading socioeconomic driver for the need for more agricultural croplands to support the growing demand. However, with the lack of available land from the crop substitution to biofuels, countries must look into areas further away to develop these original croplands. This causes spillover systems in countries where this new development takes place. For instance, African countries are converting savanna's into cropland and this all stems from the socioeconomic driver of wanting to develop biofuels. Furthermore, socioeconomic driver that cause land use change don't all occur at an international level. These drivers can be experienced all the way down to the household level. Crop substitution doesn't only come from biofuel shifts in agriculture, a big substitution came from Thailand when they switched the production of opium poppy plants to non-narcotic crops. This caused Thailand's agricultural sector to grow, but it caused global rippling effects (opium replacement).

For instance, in Wolong China, locals use forests as fuelwood to cook and heat their homes. So, the socioeconomic driver in play here is the local demand for timber to support subsistence in this area. With this driver, locals are depleting their supply for fuelwood so they have to keep moving further away to extract this resource. This movement and demand for timber is in turn contributing to the loss of pandas in this area because their ecosystem is getting destroyed.

However, when researching local trends the focus tends to be on outcomes instead of on how changes in the global drivers affect outcomes. With this being said, community level planning needs to be implemented when analyzing socioeconomic drivers of change.

In conclusion, one can see how socioeconomic drivers at any level play a role in the consequences of human actions on the environment. These drivers all have cascading effects on land, humans, resources, and the environment as a whole. With this being said, humans need to fully understand how their socioeconomic drivers can change the way we live. For instance, going back to the soy bean example, when the supply can't meet the demand for soy beans the global market for this crop increases which then in turn affects countries that rely on this crop for a food source. These affects can cause a higher price for soy beans at their stores and markets or it can cause an overall lack of availability for this crop in importing countries. With both of these outcomes, the household level is being affected by a national level socioeconomic driver of an increased demand for Brazilian soy beans in China. From just this one example alone, one can see how socioeconomic drivers influence changes at a national level that then lead to more global, regional, communal, and household level changes. The main concept to take away from this is the idea that everything is connected and that our roles and choices as humans have major driving forces that impact our world in numerous ways.

== See also ==
- Accidental injury
- Ecophysiology
- Envirome
- Environmental disease
- Environmental health
- Epidemiology
- Epidemiology of cancer
- Exposure science
- Heritability
- Hygiene hypothesis
- NIEHS
- Occupational toxicology
- Pollution
- Public health
- Quantitative genetics
- Toxicology
