= GMP =

GMP may refer to:

== Finance and economics ==
- Gross metropolitan product, a measure of goods and services produced
- Guaranteed maximum price, as agreed in some contracts
- Guaranteed Minimum Pension, in UK occupational pensions

== Science and technology ==
- GNU Multiple Precision Arithmetic Library, a software library
- Granulocyte-macrophage progenitor
- Guanosine monophosphate, a nucleotide
- Good manufacturing practice
- Graduate Medical Program
- Galápagos Microplate, a geological feature

== Transportation ==
- GmP, a category of mixed train in German-speaking countries
- Gimpo International Airport (IATA code), Seoul, South Korea
- Martin GMP, an American transport aircraft
- Gaobeidian East railway station (telegraph code), China Railway
- Hyundai Electric Global Modular Platform, a platform for electric cars

== Organizations and businesses ==
=== Government and political organizations ===
- Ganamukti Parishad, a left-wing movement organization in Tripura
- Global Monitoring Plan, a programme under the Stockholm Convention on Persistent Organic Pollutants
- Gerakan Mansuhkan PPSMI, a Malaysian political lobby
- Greater Manchester Police, England

=== Publishers of books and music ===
- Gay Men's Press, a British publisher
- Gazza Music Productions, a Namibian music label
- Goody Music Productions, a former Italian music label

=== Other organizations and businesses ===
- Gamone Pwint, a Burmese retail conglomerate
- Gerkan, Marg and Partners, a German architectural firm
- Glass, Molders, Pottery, Plastics and Allied Workers International Union, a trade union
- Global Marshall Plan, an environmental plan proposed by Al Gore and an organization created to facilitate that plan
- Good Men Project, a non-profit in New York
- Group medical practice, a US term

== Other uses ==
- Good management practice; See GxP
- Grampian, former local government area of Scotland, Chapman code
- Giovanni Mpetshi Perricard, French professional tennis player
