= Exposome =

Environmental factor to which a person is exposed

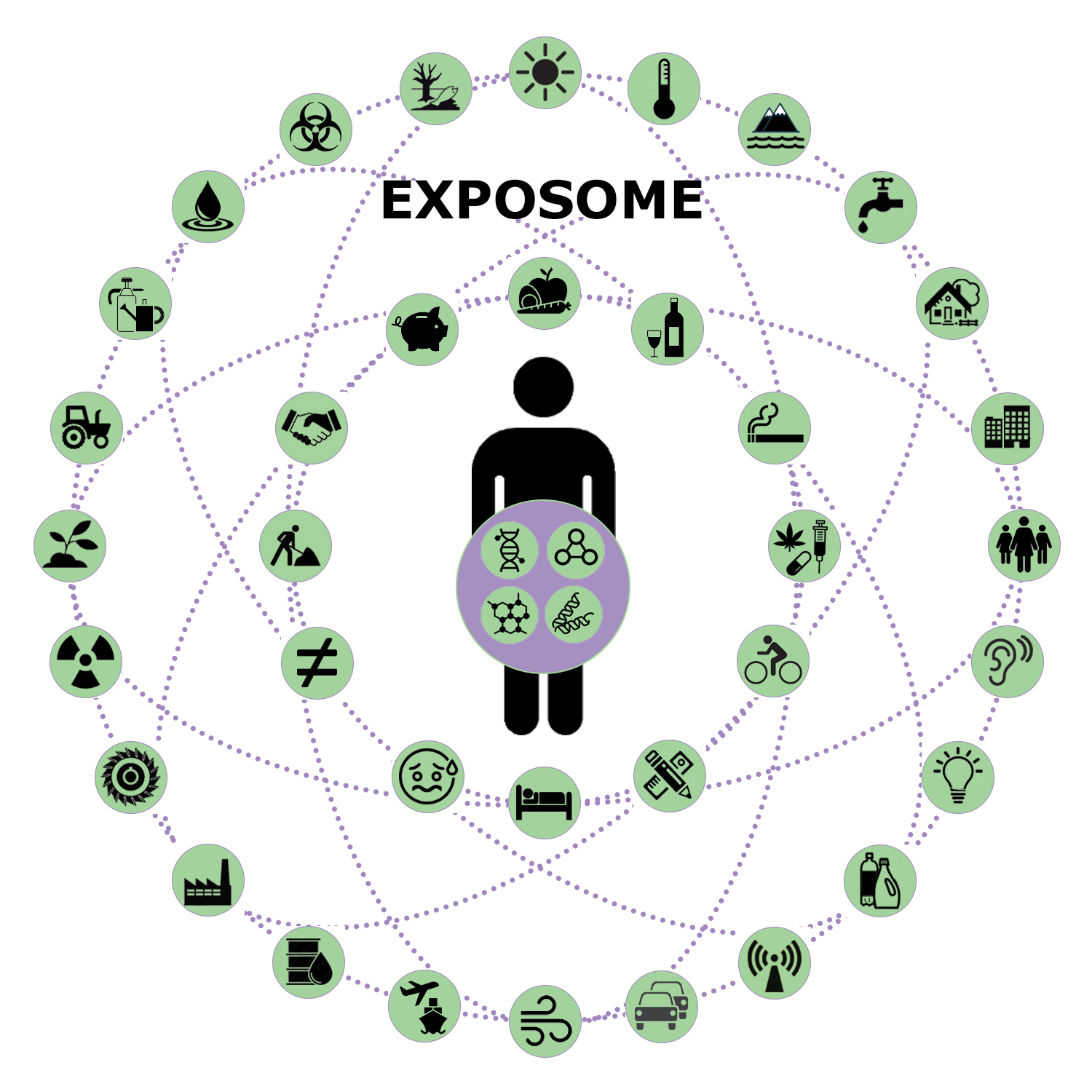
Example representation of the environmental factors characterizing the exposome

The exposome is a concept used to describe environmental exposures that an individual encounters throughout life, and how these exposures impact biology and health. It encompasses both external and internal factors, including chemical, physical, biological, and social factors that may influence human health. In 2023, the Banbury Exposomic Consortium established a consensus definition of the exposome as, "Briefly, the exposome is posited as an integrated compilation of all physical, chemical, biological, and (psycho)social influences that 'impact biology'. The field of exposomics thus examines the comprehensive and cumulative effects of these factors by integrating data from interdisciplinary methodologies and data streams to drive discovery".

The study of the exposome has become a useful tool in understanding the interplay between genetics and environmental factors in the development of diseases, with a particular focus on chronic conditions. The concept has been widely applied in fields such as epidemiology, toxicology, and public health, among others, and has led to significant advances in our understanding of disease etiology and prevention.

By considering the cumulative effect of multiple exposures, it provides a holistic approach to the study of gene-environment interactions, allowing for a more accurate assessment of disease risk and the identification of potential intervention strategies.

Environmental exposures can have a significant impact on an individual's health. Exposure to air pollution, for example, has been linked to an increased risk of respiratory disease, heart disease, and even premature death. Similarly, exposure to certain chemicals in consumer products has been linked to an increased risk of cancer and other health problems. In addition to external factors, the internal exposome can also influence an individual's health outcomes. For example, genetics can play a role in how an individual's body processes and responds to environmental exposures, while the gut microbiome can affect an individual's immune system and overall health. As our understanding of the exposome continues to evolve, it is likely that we will gain new insights into the complex interplay between our environment and our health.

== History ==
The term "exposome" was coined in 2005 by Dr. Christopher Wild, then Professor of Molecular Epidemiology at the University of Leeds UK, in a seminal paper published in Cancer Epidemiology, Biomarkers & Prevention. Wild's concept was initially proposed to complement the human genome, as he recognized the limitations of genetic research in explaining the etiology of chronic diseases. By suggesting a systematic approach to measuring environmental exposures, the exposome aimed to fill this knowledge gap.

Various definitions of the exposome have been proposed over time, but most emphasize three main components: the external exposome, the internal exposome, and the biological response. The external exposome includes general external factors, such as air pollution, diet, and socioeconomic factors, as well as specific external factors like chemicals and radiation. The internal exposome comprises endogenous factors, such as hormones, inflammation, oxidative stress, and gut microbiota. Finally, the biological response refers to the complex interactions between the external and internal exposome factors and their influence on an individual's physiology and health.

== Significance ==
The field of exposome research is relatively new and rapidly evolving, and is still being developed and refined by researchers in a variety of fields, including epidemiology, environmental health, and genomics. Understanding the exposome is important because it can help researchers identify the environmental factors that contribute to disease, and develop strategies for prevention and treatment.

The exposome concept presents several challenges for researchers. One of the main challenges is the complexity and diversity of exposures that individuals experience throughout their lifetime. There are thousands of chemicals in the environment, and individuals are exposed to different combinations of chemicals depending on their location, occupation, and lifestyles. Besides this, a lack of standardized methods for measuring exposures is also challenging. Traditional approaches to measuring environmental exposures have relied on individual exposure assessments, which are often expensive and time-consuming. To address this challenge, new technologies—such as high-throughput methods for measuring multiple exposures simultaneously and spatial exposomics— are being developed.

Understanding exposomes has significant implications for public health and the development of more effective strategies for prevention and treatment of disease. For example, if research shows that exposure to a certain chemical is linked to an increased risk of cancer, policymakers can take steps to regulate or ban the use of that chemical.

In addition to informing public health policies, the study of the exposome can also help individuals make more informed choices about their own health. By understanding the environmental factors that contribute to disease, individuals can take steps to reduce their exposure to harmful substances and improve their overall health.

The exposome concept holds promise for advancing understanding of the interplay between environmental exposures and human health. As researchers continue to refine exposure assessment methods, identify novel biomarkers, and develop computational approaches, the exposome framework is poised to revolutionize the fields of epidemiology, toxicology, and public health.

== Global initiatives ==
There are several research initiatives aimed to better understand the exposome. In the United States, "NEXUS: Network for Exposomics in the U.S. Coordinating Center" (NEXUS) was established in 2024 by the U.S. National Institutes of Health (NIH), along with the NIH centers for research ongoing on the human exposome. NEXUS is a coordinating center and a movement to how our environments, or the exposome, shape human health, with a goal to transform the entire biomedical enterprise.

The Gateway Exposome Coordinator Center (GECC) is another United States based initiative aimed to advance life course research on the Alzheimer’s disease and related dementia (AD/ADRD) exposome. The GECC is funded by the National Institute on Aging (NIA) U24AG088894.

Additionally, Mount Sinai's Institute for Exposomic Research organizes an international series of symposia focused on Exposomics, Aging, and Alzheimer's Disease Across the Life Course. These symposia are funded by the National Institutes on Aging to promote international research in ADRD Exposomic Research and address the role of environment in aging processes globally.

Other global initiatives include the 2025 Exposome Moonshot Forum which brought together diverse stakeholders from industry, academia, and government to chart the future of the Human Exposome. This meeting led to the formation of the Global Exposome Forum which is an emerging coalition of organizations and individuals working toward the same goals of advancing new research, capacity and network building, and facilitating institutional support for a future informed by exposomics.

Also held in 2025 was the Genomics Meets Exposomics: Advancing Gene x Environment Science conference which was held at the Mendel Museum in Brno, Czech Republic and was co-led by NEXUS and EIRENE. The meeting aimed to develop an action plan for the advancement of gene-by-environment studies to better understand human disease. The meeting brought together 35 participants at the forefront of genomics and exposomics, as well as those whose work spans transitional and clinical research, big data and AI, population sciences, toxicology, and the social sciences - in order to deepen engagement with those in the genetics community and European scientists to address the critical need of merging methods, techniques, and expertise in exposomics and genomics to provide a foundation for systematic gene-by-environment studies.

Other initiatives include the "Enhanced exposure assessment and omic profiling for high priority environmental exposures in Europe", a program by the Imperial College of Science, Technology and Medicine in the UK. A current initiative is EXIMIOUS - a 5-year Research and Innovation Action funded by the European Union's Horizon 2020 program, aimed at introducing a new approach to mapping exposure-induced immune effects by combining exposomics and immunomics in a unique toolbox. Another is the National Institutes of Health's Environmental Influences on Child Health Outcomes (ECHO) program, which is studying the impact of these factors on children's health. We also have the Human Exposome Project, a collaborative effort between researchers from around the world to develop tools and techniques to measure and analyze the exposome.

Furthermore, several European countries, including Sweden, France, Austria, and Czechia, have been actively involved in establishing dedicated research infrastructures for exposomics. In Sweden, the National Facility for Exposomics was approved in November 2020 and is hosted by the University of Stockholm. The facility is currently operational in Solna, providing resources and expertise for exposomics research. France has also established a dedicated research infrastructure, France Exposome, a new National Research Infrastructure that focuses on environmental health. It has been included in the 2021 roadmap for the research infrastructure of the Ministry of Higher Education and Research, indicating its significance in the country's research landscape.

Additionally, the Environmental Exposure Assessment Research Infrastructure (EIRENE) is a collaborative effort consisting of 17 National Nodes representing around 50 institutions with complementary expertise. EIRENE aims to fill the gap in the European infrastructural landscape and pioneer the first EU infrastructure on the human exposome. The consortium has a geographically balanced network, covering Northern (Finland, Iceland, Norway, Sweden), Western (Belgium, France, Germany, Netherlands, UK), Southern (Greece, Italy, Slovenia, Spain), and Central and Eastern (Austria, Czech Republic, Slovakia) Europe, as well as the US. The EIRENE RI team consists of scientists leading exposome research on an international level.

These initiatives reflect the growing recognition of the importance of exposomics research and the commitment of these countries to advancing the field. The establishment of dedicated research infrastructures ensures the availability of resources and expertise required to uncover crucial insights into the impact of exposomes on human health.

== Methodologies ==
The study of the exposome requires a multi-disciplinary approach that combines advances in exposure assessment, bioinformatics, and systems biology. As such, researchers have developed a range of key methodologies to measure and analyze the exposome – from exposure assessment techniques, analytical tools, to computational approaches.

These methods are designed to capture and analyze the diverse and dynamic nature of environmental exposures across a person's lifespan.

=== Exposure assessment ===
The assessment of environmental exposures is a critical aspect of exposome research. Traditional methods, such as questionnaires and environmental monitoring, provide useful information on external factors but may not adequately capture the complexity and variability of exposures over time.

Consequently, researchers have increasingly turned to personal monitoring devices, such as wearable sensors, personal monitoring devices, and smartphone applications, which can collect real-time data on an individual's exposure to various environmental factors, such as air pollution, noise, and ultraviolet radiation. The data collected by these devices can help researchers understand how personal behaviors and microenvironments contribute to overall exposome profiles.

=== Biomarkers ===
Biomarkers (measurable indicators of biological processes or conditions) play an essential role in characterizing the internal exposome and biological response. This approach involves the measurement of chemicals or their metabolites in biological specimens such as blood, urine, or tissues. Advances in high-throughput -omics technologies such as genomics, transcriptomics, proteomics, and metabolomics, have revolutionized our ability to measure thousands of biomarkers simultaneously. This can provide a detailed snapshot of an individual's molecular profile at a given time, as well as a comprehensive view of the individual's biological response to environmental exposures. These technologies yield a direct and quantitative assessment of an individual's exposure to specific compounds and have been increasingly incorporated into exposome research and epidemiological studies.

=== Geographic Information Systems (GIS) ===
GIS tools can be used to estimate an individual's exposure to environmental factors based on spatial data, such as air pollution or proximity to hazardous waste sites. GIS-based exposure assessment has been applied in numerous epidemiological studies to investigate the relationship between environmental exposures and health outcomes.

=== Computational approaches ===
The vast amounts of data generated by exposome research require advanced computational methods for storage, analysis, and interpretation. Machine learning and other data mining techniques have emerged as valuable tools for identifying patterns and relationships within complex exposome data sets. Furthermore, systems biology approaches, which integrate data from multiple -omics platforms can help elucidate the complex interactions between exposures and biological pathways that contribute to disease development.

== Applications ==
=== Epidemiology ===
Exposome research has had a significant impact on the field of epidemiology, providing new insights into the complex relationships between environmental exposures, genetic factors, and human health. By comprehensively assessing the totality of exposures, epidemiologists can better understand the etiology of chronic diseases, such as cancer, cardiovascular disease, and neurodegenerative disorders, and identify modifiable risk factors that may be targets for intervention.

Large-scale exposome projects, such as the Human Early-Life Exposome (HELIX) project and the European Exposome Cluster, have been established to investigate these relationships and generate new knowledge on disease etiology and prevention.

=== Toxicology ===
The exposome has also influenced the field of toxicology, leading to the development of new methods for assessing the cumulative effects of multiple environmental exposures on human health. By integrating exposure data with molecular profiling techniques, toxicologists can better understand the mechanisms through which environmental chemicals and other factors contribute to adverse health outcomes. This knowledge can inform the development of more effective strategies for chemical risk assessment and regulation.

=== Public health ===
Public health research and practice have greatly benefited from the insights gained through exposome research. By elucidating the complex interactions between environmental exposures and human health, the exposome framework can inform the design of targeted interventions to reduce disease risk and promote health equity.

Moreover, the development of exposome-based tools, such as biomonitoring and personal exposure monitoring devices, can help public health practitioners better track population exposures and evaluate the effectiveness of interventions.

== Challenges and future directions ==
Despite significant advances in exposome research, several challenges remain, including the development of more accurate exposure assessment techniques, the identification of novel biomarkers, and the management of large- scale and complex data sets.

=== Exposure assessment ===
One of the main challenges in exposome research is the accurate assessment of exposures across an individual's lifetime. While recent technological advancements have improved our ability to measure environmental exposures in real-time, there is still a need for methods that can retrospectively assess historical exposures, particularly in the context of chronic disease research.

=== Biomarker identification ===
Another challenge lies in the identification of novel and informative biomarkers that can provide insights into the biological pathways underlying exposure-disease relationships. While omics technologies have greatly expanded the number of measurable biomarkers, researchers must still determine which of these markers are most relevant to specific health outcomes and how they may be affected by various exposures.

=== Data management ===
Exposome research generates vast amounts of complex data, posing challenges related to data storage, analysis, and interpretation. As the field continues to grow, the development of standardized data formats, data sharing platforms, and advanced computational methods for data integration will be crucial to maximizing the potential of exposome research.

== See also ==
- ASTDR
- Dose-response relationship
- Environment and health
- The dose makes the poison
- Toxicokinetics
