= Intake fraction =

Intake fraction is a measurement of pollution and it can be used in the determination of the environmental health impact of a pollutant source. Intake fraction is the ratio of the mass of a pollutant inhaled or ingested to the mass of the pollutant emitted. Traditionally, scientists and policy makers have used a source-oriented approach to reduce health impacts from pollution. That is, they identified the largest producers of various pollutants and worked to reduce the amount of pollutants emitted. Exposure assessment, also referred to as exposure analysis, is a receptor-oriented science, and practitioners in this field focus on the sources of pollutants that result in the largest human exposure. The same principles can be used to assess pollutant impact on non-human organisms, but most exposure analysts focus on humans.

== Definition ==
Intake fraction is the total mass of a pollutant ingested or inhaled by all exposed individuals over a given time, per total mass of the pollutant emitted. The intake fraction can be divided into components that identify the specific pollutant source, route, media, and subpopulation of exposed individuals. For example, policy makers may be interested in the total mass of mercury emitted by one specific coal-burning electric generator that is ingested in water by the residents living below the poverty level in one specific town.

Mathematically, intake fraction can be represented by the mass of pollutant intake divided by the mass of pollutant emitted:

Intake Fraction = Mass of Pollutant Intake (summed over all exposed individuals) / Mass of Pollutant Emitted

== Determination ==
Direct measurement of intake fraction would only be reasonably possible in very specific, small scale situations. For example, direct measurement of carbon monoxide from a space heater in a small house with three occupants could be achieved if each of the occupants used a personal CO monitor. Most situations of interest are too complicated to measure directly and modeling is used to estimate intake fraction. The models take into account the mass of pollutant released from the source, the horizontal and vertical distance between the point of emission and the exposed individuals, atmospheric conditions for outdoor sources, number of exposed individuals, and the time of exposure for these individuals.

== Applications ==
The health impact of a pollutant source can be represented by the product of the total mass of a pollutant emitted, the intake fraction of the pollutant, and the toxicity of the pollutant. In the form of an equation:

Health Impact = Total Mass Emitted * Intake Fraction * Toxicity

Policy makers can use the intake fraction from various sources of a pollutant to determine which source will yield the largest return on the investment to reduce the pollutant. For example, an oil drilling facility may emit far greater mass of pollutants than a refueling station. However, if the oil drilling is located on a platform 10 miles offshore and the refueling station is in an urban area, then very few people will be exposed to the emitted pollutants. A relatively small reduction in emissions from the refueling station may yield a larger reduction in health impact than a large reduction at the oil platform.

Policy makers may also be interested in comparing the intake fraction among various groups within the population to assess environmental justice. For example, it may be of interest to determine the intake fraction of low-income residents of a town versus high-income residents of the town.
