= Predictive intake modelling =

Predictive intake modelling uses mathematical modelling strategies to estimate intake of food, personal care products, and their formulations.

== Definition ==
Predictive intake modelling seeks to estimate intake of products and/or their constituents which may enter the body through various routes such as ingestion, inhalation and absorption.

Predictive intake modelling can be applied to determine trends in food consumption and product use for the purpose of extrapolation.

== Applications ==
A predictive intake modelling approach is used to estimate voluntary food intake (VFI) by animals where their eating habits cannot be exactly measured. For humans, predictive intake modelling is used to make estimations of intake from foods, pesticides, cosmetics and inhalants as well as substances that can be contained in these like nutrients, functional ingredients, chemicals and contaminants.

Predictive intake modelling has applications in public health, risk assessment and exposure assessment, where estimating intake or exposure to different substances can influence the decision making process.

== Predictive intake modelling strategies ==
=== Regression approach ===
The regression analysis approach is based on estimations through extrapolation or interpolation where there is a cause-and-effect relationship found by data fitting. These trends tend to be phenomenological.

=== Mechanistic modelling approach ===
A mechanistic modelling approach is one where a model is derived from basic theory. Examples of these include compartmental models which can be used to describe the circulation and concentration of airborne particles in a room or household for estimating intake of inhalants.

=== Population-based approach ===
A population-based approach tracks consumer intake from individual members of a sample population over time. Mathematical models are used to combine these habits and practices databases with separate databases on product or food formulation to estimate intake or exposure for the sample population. Moreover, survey weights may be applied to each subject in the study based on their age, demographic and location allowing the sample of subjects to correctly represent an entire population, and thus estimate intake for that population.

=== Probabilistic modelling approach ===
Probabilistic models are based on the Monte Carlo method where distributions of data from various sources are randomly sampled from to calculate percentile statistics. Such probabilistic techniques typically utilise product or consumption survey data from a sample population combined with distributions of substances that may be found within those foods or products. For example, the Food and Drug Administration (FDA) suggests that the estimation of intake of substances in food can be probabilistically conducted through food consumption surveys (NHANES/CSFII) from sample populations combined with distributions of substance concentration data to calculate the Estimated Daily Intake. The European Food Safety Authority (EFSA) funded the Monte Carlo Risk Assessment (MCRA) tool to estimate usual intake exposure distributions based on statistical models which utilise the EFSA Comprehensive Database, which contains detailed food consumption survey data. EFSA also funded Creme Global to develop a model and databases of European food consumption on which statistical models can be run to assess intake and exposure on a pan-European basis.

== See also ==
- Predictive modelling
- Exposure science
- Exposure Assessment
