= Workplace exposure monitoring =

Monitoring of substances in a workplace that are chemical or biological hazards

Workplace exposure monitoring is the monitoring of substances in a workplace that are chemical or biological hazards. It is performed in the context of workplace exposure assessment and risk assessment. Exposure monitoring analyzes hazardous substances in the air or on surfaces of a workplace, and is complementary to biomonitoring, which instead analyzes toxicants or their effects within workers.

A wide array of methods and instrumentation are used in workplace exposure monitoring. Direct-read instruments give immediate data, and include colorimetric indicators such as gas detector tubes, and electronic devices such as gas monitors and aerosol particle counters. In addition, samples may be collected and sent to a laboratory for slower but often more thorough analysis.

== Overview ==
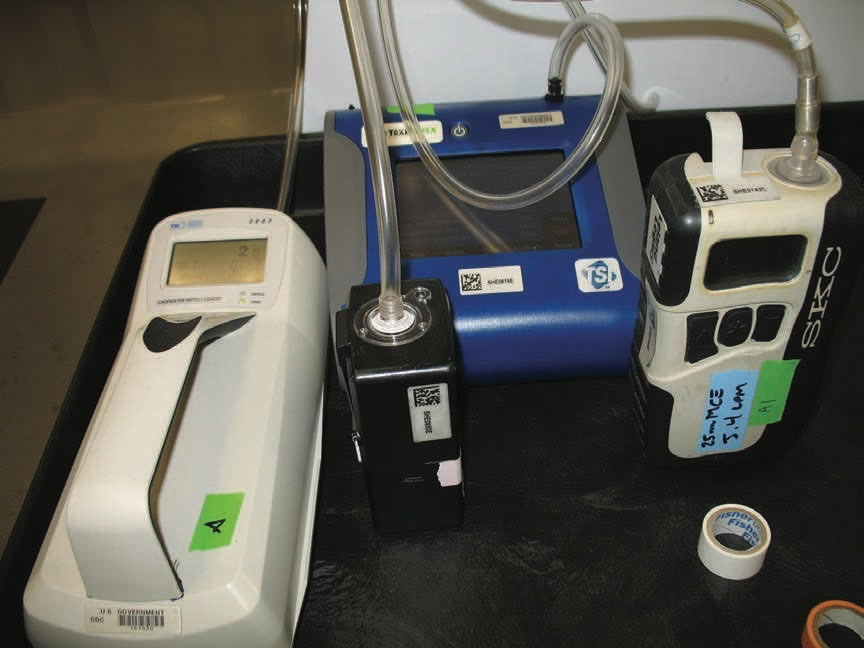
Instruments typically used for monitoring of particulates: a condensation particle counter (left), aerosol photometer (blue device at top), which are both electronic direct-read instruments; and two air-sampling pumps for filter-based analysis

Exposure monitoring may be done for reasons of regulatory compliance, selection of hazard controls to implement, verification of engineering controls, reducing workers' compensation costs, or belief in a right or responsibility to understand health risks in the workplace.

Instrumentation includes direct-reading instruments, sampling pumps, and stationary monitoring devices. Samples need to be sent to a laboratory for analysis, which requires a delay of hours or days. By contrast, direct-read instruments provide data immediately. Direct-read instruments are sometimes used for screening before taking samples. Calibration and maintenance is an important function, especially if quality assurance standards are mandated for that workplace.

A monitoring plan requires understanding of the work tasks being performed and by whom, and the hazards associated with them. It is important to monitor a statistically representative population. Workers are often divided into "similar exposure groups" with similar work assignments and contaminant exposure profiles. Data must be validated, reported, and communicated. Exposure monitoring may be targeted to individual workers, or areas.

Chemical warfare agents have extremely low occupational exposure limits that are below the sensitivity threshold for most typical monitoring methods, and often require specialized equipment. For biological agents, some methods can determine if a suspect material is of biological origin without identifying it, while identification requires other methods.

== Direct-read instruments ==
=== Colorimetric ===
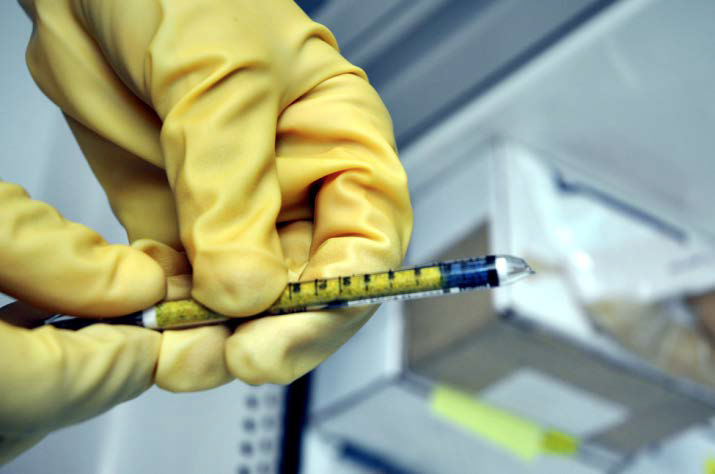
A colorimetric gas detector tube in use

Colorimetric testing devices contain substances that change color upon exposure to a certain substance.

Gas detector tubes are glass tubes filled with a solid granular material incorporating a chemical color change reagent. Detector tubes are available for over 300 gases, vapors, and aerosols in air, with each tube specific for one or a few chemicals. Air may be passed through the tube with a hand pump or powered air pump for spot measurements, or by diffusion for long-term measurements. The chemical concentration is generally determined by the length of the color stain in the tube, although a few use a comparison of the intensity of the stain to a color chart. They are sensitive in the percent to parts-per-billion range. The color change reactions include production of molecular iodine, precipitation reactions of metal salts, various addition reactions of aromatic compounds, redox reactions, and pH indicators. Other chemical reactions may occur before the color change reaction. While fast and inexpensive, they generally only have accuracy within 20%, have the potential for interference with other chemicals, and may be temperature sensitive.

For chemical warfare agents, specialized detection papers or kits, and colorimetric tubes can be used. For biological agents, protein paper and pH paper can indicate the presence of biological material, while identification can be done with handheld immunoassays and semi-portable polymerase chain reaction systems.

=== Electronic ===
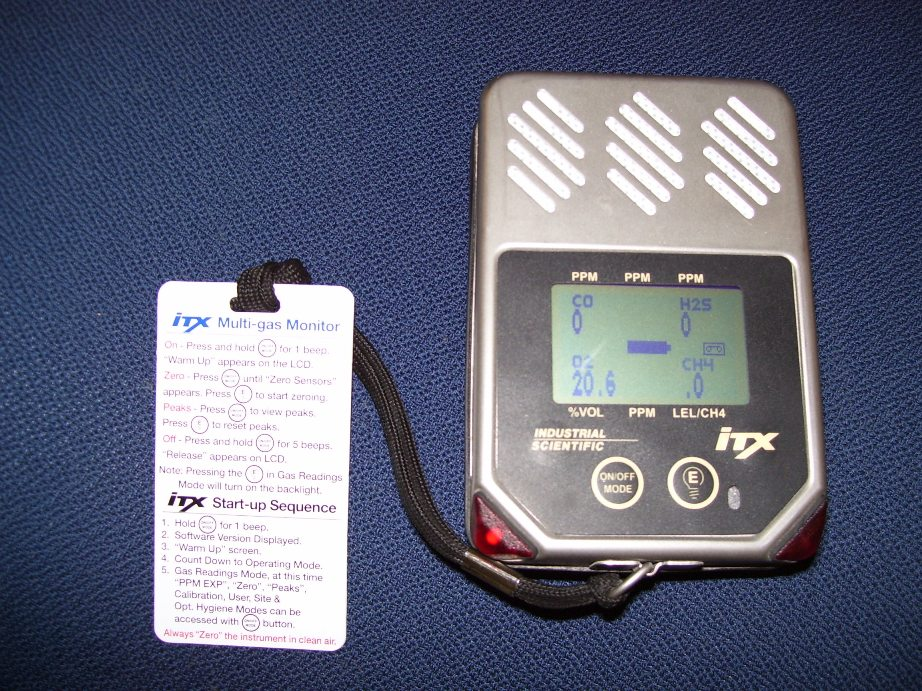
A multi-gas monitor with an instruction card

Electronic direct-read instruments for gases include photoionization detectors, infrared analyzers, and gas monitors. For dust and particulates, instruments include aerosol photometers and condensation particle counters. Handheld electronic monitors give instantaneous readouts, but can experience interference from similar compounds, and the user must be knowledgeable enough to calibrate the device, and interpret its results with the specific device's limitations in mind. Fixed air monitors do not require an operator and can be left on continuously. Electronic instruments may be designed to detect one or several gasses.

Gas monitors may be single, dual, or multi-gas monitors. Some types include oxygen sensors, explosibility sensors for combustible gas, and toxic gas sensors for substances including carbon monoxide, hydrogen sulfide, nitrogen dioxide, sulfur dioxide, chlorine, chlorine dioxide, phosphine, ammonia, hydrogen cyanide, and hydrogen. Mercury vapor analyzers are also used. Electrochemical gas sensors use a porous membrane (normally PTFE) or capillary system which allows the gas to diffuse into the cell containing the liquid or gel electrolyte and the electrodes, causing a change in electrochemical potential between the electrodes. Because of the low power requirements and small size, they can be used in personal monitors that have dosimeter and alarm functions.

Photoionization detectors can continuously monitor for chemicals but cannot identify them.

Aerosol photometers utilize light scattering as a detection method, and generally are lighter, more rugged, and have continuous readout relative to other direct-reading aerosol monitors. Photometers generally cannot discriminate between different types of aerosol, and background dust and water droplets can overwhelm readings for the target aerosol. For quantitative measurements, it is necessary to calibrate with an aerosol similar in refractive index and particle size to the one being measured.

For chemical warfare agents, ion-mobility spectrometers, surface acoustic wave sensors, and van-mounted or portable gas chromatograph–mass spectrometers (GC/MS) may be used. Portable GC/MS instruments are capable of detecting substances at the parts-per-billion to parts-per-trillion level, including narcotics, explosives, hazardous industrial chemicals, and chemical warfare agents. For biological agents, some instruments can indicate the presence of biological material, such as particle analyzers, fluorometers for DNA, luminometers for ATP, and colorimeters for proteins.

== Sampling ==
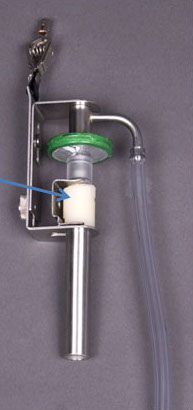
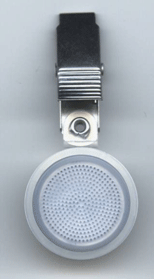
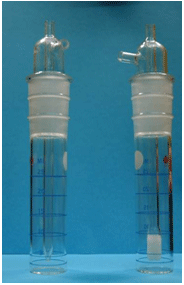
Three types of air sample collectors: left to right, a filter and cyclone apparatus, a diffusive sampler badge, and an impinger and bubbler

Samples may be collected through a gas sampling bag, filter, sorbent tube, or wipe. The sampling method is often chosen to match the desired analysis method. Personal air-sampling pumps pull air into a charcoal tube or filter cassette for laboratory analysis. They are more accurate than other methods, but are bulkier to wear and require more specialized knowledge to use.

=== Particulates ===
For particulates, polyvinyl chloride (PVC) filters are often used for sample collection. Other membrane filter materials include polytetrafluoroethylene (PTFE), copolymers, and mixed cellulose esters. Additionally, quartz or glass fiber filters may be used for mercaptans and diesel exhaust, and polycarbonate straight pore filters are suitable for electron microscopy and X-ray fluorescence analysis.

The analysis method affects the type of filter used. For gravimetric analysis, non-hygroscopic materials are selected because their masses are less affected by changes in humidity. For microscopy, cellulose ester or polycarbonate membranes are preferred as the former can be rendered transparent, while the latter have a smooth collection surface. For bioaerosols collected to be cultured, gelatin filters ease transferring the samples to culture media, but are fragile. Impingers are also useful for bioaerosols as they collect samples in a liquid to avoid them losing their viability.

Sampling usually distinguishes between total, inhalable, thoracic, and respirable dust. These categories correspond to how deep the particulates are deposited in the lung, with the respirable fraction being small enough to be deposited in its gas exchange region. The particle size selection may be determined through use of a cyclone device; as the air flow rate also affects size selection, pump calibration is important. Another size selection device is an impactor, where the air stream flows through a nozzle toward an impaction surface, where larger particles impact the surface, while smaller particles are deflected and remain in the air stream. In some applications, impactors are simply used to remove larger particles before collection or characterization. For bioaerosols, they may also be used as collection devices themselves, as in an Andersen impactor where Petri dishes are directly used as the impaction surfaces.

Bulk samples of suspected contaminants may be taken to compare with air samples or for additional analysis that requires more material. Field blanks may be used as a negative control to determine if contamination occurred before analysis or during sample handling, shipping, or storage.

=== Gases ===
For organic vapors and gases, solid sorbent sampling tubes may be used with charcoal and other sorbents as the sampling media and an active pump. Activated charcoal is the most common sorbent used, with other typical sorbents including silica gel, porous polymers, synthetic carbonaceous sorbents, coated sorbents, molecular sieves, and thermal desorption tubes.

Diffusive samplers, also known as passive monitors or badges, require no pump but are less accurate and sensitive. These vapor monitor badges are more accurate than diffusion tubes, but must be analyzed in a laboratory, require collection of environmental conditions such as temperature and relative humidity, and are usually more expensive. Vapor monitor badges are available for a limited number of chemicals, but some that are available include formaldehyde, organic vapors, ethylene oxide, mercury, and nitrous oxide.

Impingers and bubblers collect samples in a fluid; they are especially useful in high humidity environments.

Gas sampling bags are often used to sample carbon dioxide, carbon monoxide, and nitrous oxide, as well as whole air samples for forensic-type investigations.

== Standards and regulation ==
Within the domain of workplace exposure monitoring, it is really important to follow certain standards and methods of doing things to make sure workers stay safe. Particularly, these standards are naturally linked to the monitoring process, forming a strong foundation for safeguarding and protecting worker's health. One key aspect involves the comparison of exposure monitoring results with established health and safety guidelines. This analysis acts as a checkpoint, precisely aligning exposure levels with permissible limits and indicating when corrective measures are necessary. This combination of exposure monitoring with standards forms the backbone of a comprehensive approach to workplace safety.

An example of this collaboration lies in the ANSI/ISEA standard 102–1990, specifically addressing gas detection tubes. These standards, created by the American National Standards Institute (ANSI) and the International Safety Equipment Association (ISEA), demonstrate the intersection of regulations and monitoring. The Safety Equipment Institute's third-party certification testing further solidifies this connection, ensuring the effectiveness and reliability of exposure monitoring equipment. It is through such standards that the monitoring process becomes a well-defined and reliable tool in supporting workplace safety.

As we delve into the complex landscape of workplace safety, the narrative extends globally, merging in internationally recognized organizations. OSHA (Permissible exposure limits or PELs), ACGIH (Threshold Limit Values or TLVs), NIOSH (Recommended Exposure Limits or REL), and Germany's influential MAK values are not just regulatory benchmarks; they are essential for learning about monitoring. Understanding these standards becomes a lens through which the monitoring process gains clarity and significance, promoting a universal language of occupational health. In essence, these standards aim to ensure that workplaces worldwide adhere to the highest safety standards through an interdependent relationship between regulations and careful observation. They show what different groups think is safe, using different considerations.
