= Mathematical exposure modeling =

Mathematical exposure modeling is an indirect method of determining exposure, particularly for human exposure to environmental contaminants. It is useful when direct measurement of pollutant concentration is not feasible because direct measurement sometimes requires skilled professionals and complex, expensive laboratory equipment. The ability to make inferences in the absence of direct measurements, makes exposure modeling a powerful tool for predicting exposures by exploring hypothetical situations. It allows researchers to ask "what if" questions about exposure scenarios.

== Modeling indoor air ==
Mathematical modeling is commonly used to determine human exposure to indoor air pollution. Studies have shown that humans spend about 90% of their time indoors, and contaminant levels may be as high or higher inside than outside, due to the presence of multiple indoor contaminant sources, in combination with poor ventilation. Indoor air modeling requires information on a number of parameters including the air exchange rate, deposition rate, source emission rate, and physical volume of the indoor setting. Indoor environments can basically be thought of as closed systems, so models describing them are usually based on the "mass balance" equation. It is also assumed that a pollutant emitted into an indoor environment instantly spreads uniformly throughout the system, so that the concentration is the same at any point in space at any point in time. Mathematically, the total pollutant mass emitted inside a chamber during time T can be expressed as

G_{source}(T) = $\int_{0}^{T} g(t)\, dt$

where

G_{source}(T) = total mass contributed by the source over time T (e.g., mg)
g(t) = emission flow rate as a function of time t (e.g., mg/min)

The total mass lost during time T can be expressed as

Q_{lost}(T) = $\int_{0}^{T} wx(t)\, dt$

where

Q_{lost}(T) = total mass lost from the chamber over time T (e.g., mg)
x(t) = concentration of pollutant in the air exiting the chamber (e.g., mg/m^{3})
w = flow rate of air exiting the chamber (e.g., m^{3}/min)

Following the principle of the "mass balance" equation, the total mass in the chamber at time T, is the difference between the two equations above, mass generated during time T minus mass lost during time T. This value may also be calculated from the equation

Total mass inside the chamber at time T = vx(T)

== Modeling human exposure to air pollution ==
There are two critical pieces of information that are needed to calculate human exposure. These include data on 1) the whereabouts of the individual or individuals being exposed and 2) the concentration of the pollutants in the different locations. This can be expressed mathematically as the sum of the products of time spent by a person in those different locations by the time-averaged air pollutant concentrations occurring in those locations.

E_{p} = $\sum_{i=1}^m$ C_{pi}T_{pi}

where

T_{pi} is the time spent by person p in microenvironment i, and C_{pi} is the concentration of the air pollutant that person p experiences in microenvironment i, E_{p} is the integrated exposure for person p and m is the number of different microenvironments.

As mentioned above, knowing the whereabouts of the individual or individuals, is very important when trying to determine air pollution exposure. In the absence of data obtained from direct observation, human activity pattern data may be used. This data can be found in several reports conducted by the U.S. Environmental Protection Agency. The data was collected through the National Human Activity Pattern Survey (NHAPS), and contains a representative cross-section of 24-hour daily activity patterns. This data can be used to create inhalation exposure models which can serve as useful public health tools for epidemiology, education, intervention, risk assessment, and creation of air quality guidelines.

== See also ==
- Predictive intake modelling
