= Safe Planet =

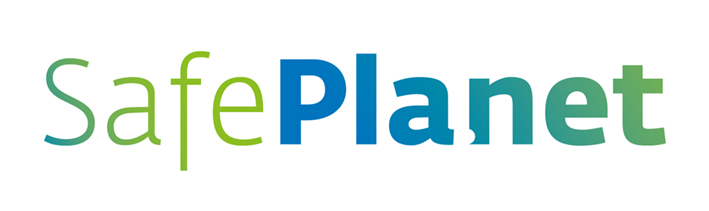
Safe Planet Campaign logo

Safe Planet: the United Nations Campaign for Responsibility on Hazardous Chemicals and Wastes is the UN Environment Programme (UNEP) and UN Food and Agricultural Organization-led global public awareness and outreach campaign for ensuring the safety of human health and the environment against hazardous chemicals and wastes.

The Secretariats of the Basel Convention, the Rotterdam Convention and the Stockholm Convention on Persistent Organic Pollutants, the three leading global chemicals and waste management instruments, provide the measures, new initiatives and solutions to deal with the growing problems of hazardous chemicals and wastes. Basel, Rotterdam and Stockholm Conventions encompass the management of hazardous chemicals, especially the persistent organic pollutants (POPs), which are covered by all three treaties. The Conventions target chemical pollutants like dioxins and furans, hazardous pesticides and DDT, polychlorinated biphenyls (PCBs), polybrominated diphenyl ethers (PBDEs), PFOS, and the heavy metals: arsenic, cadmium, mercury and lead.

== Objectives ==
Safe Planet supports the life-cycle approach to chemicals and waste management and is working towards finding the solutions to the challenges posed by toxic chemicals and wastes. The Campaign also seeks to involve people working at all levels of society in action against hazardous chemicals and wastes. Participants include Government, industry, educational institutions, community-led initiatives, grassroots organizations, individual households and consumers.

The main goal of the Safe Planet Campaign is the pursuit of a safe and sustainable planet.

== History ==
The Safe Planet Campaign was created in order to increase synergies among the three Conventions and to improve the cooperation and coordination of the management of chemicals at the global, regional and national levels. The Safe Planet Campaign was launched in February 2010 during the coinciding extraordinary meetings of the Conferences of the Parties to the Basel, Rotterdam and Stockholm Conventions, held back-to-back with the UNEP Governing Council meeting in Bali, Indonesia, at a special event – The United Nations Body Burden Forum.

Since its launch, the Safe Planet Campaign has obtained partners around the world. The events and exhibits prepared for the Campaign have been covered by the mainstream and new social media. The participants collaborated in arts, culture, sports, science, education, business, and politics to motivate governments, industry, communities and individuals to respond to the need for action.

== Events ==
=== United Nations Body Burden Forum ===
The United Nations Body Burden Forum has introduced the Campaign’s flagship human biomonitoring project. This project exposed the presence in human bodies of hazardous chemicals covered by the Basel, Rotterdam and Stockholm Conventions, for example persistent organic pollutants, pesticides and heavy metals.

The first UN Body Burden Forum featured UN Messenger of Peace and Nobel Peace Prize recipient Professor Wangari Maathai and UN Under-Secretary General Jan Kubiš. The Campaign supporters, like American actor Bryan Cranston, Indonesian environment activist Yuyun Ismawati and Peter Kenmore, Co-Executive Secretary of the Rotterdam Convention, committed to undertake testing of their chemical body burdens.

The second forum, the United Nations Champions Body Burden Forum, took place in New York in May 2010 at the 18th session of the Commission on Sustainable Development. Among the participants there were the American screen actor and eco-activist Ed Begley Jr. and Norwegian Olympic Gold Medalist Stine Lise Hattestad Bratsberg.

=== Safe Planet Films and Adventure at Sea ===
Body Burden and 5 Gyres are the first of a series of Safe Planet films. These films contributed to the elevation of awareness and spread of the idea of chemical body burden and plastic pollution of the oceans. The films carry the message that no one is immune from exposures to hazardous chemicals. They highlight how vulnerable communities face heightened risk of exposures to toxic chemicals and how action is needed to protect people and the planet. They also elevate awareness and support for the Global Monitoring Plan of the Stockholm Convention, which tracks levels of persistent organic pollutants in humans.

The Sea Dragon, an NGO-led research vessel collecting plastic drift waste and fish samples from the oceans’ 5 gyres, has raised awareness of the 9 new POPs covered by the Stockholm Convention, protection of marine life and global food security. The expedition to the South Atlantic gyre landed in Cape Town, South Africa in early December and then set out of Montevideo, Uruguay in early January 2011. Mary Osborne, a professional surfer and model participating in the transatlantic voyage, announced her support for the Safe Planet Campaign at a press event at the Two Oceans Aquarium in Cape Town, South Africa.

=== Allies in the Animal Kingdom ===
The Campaign supports the efforts to redirect electrical and electronic waste – e-waste –away from environmentally unsound landfill, open-pit burning and harmful recycling operations. Safe Planet seeks to protect the environment and improve the health and welfare of workers in the informal sector as part of UNEP's efforts to build a global “green economy” of green jobs. In the 2010 International Year of Biodiversity, the Campaign’s slogan “A Planet Safe for All Living Things” served as a link of the chemicals and waste management to the protection of endangered species.

The international project “We Help Gorillas” was launched by Prague Zoo as the Safe Planet project to foster mobile phone recycling and to raise awareness of the threats to gorilla populations living in Africa’s Congo Basin. This project spread to thirteen zoos in the Czech Republic and served as a model of public involvement in e-waste recycling, which is promoted by Safe Planet and the Basel Convention.

=== Visual and performing arts for a Safe Planet ===
The first Safe Planet exhibition, Substantialis Corporis Mixti (Substantial Form of the Blended Body): The Synergies Exhibition of the Basel, Rotterdam and Stockholm Conventions, took place at the Czech Center's Bohemian National Hall in New York City. It was held on the occasion of the 18th session of the Commission on Sustainable Development (May 2010). Ten artists from five countries presented works that questioned the sustainability of our current path while offering new perspectives on balancing humans´ relationship to the natural environment.

WHAT WILL BE was the second exhibition that was curated for the 16th Conference of the Parties to the UN Framework Convention on Climate Change (November/December 2010), demonstrated the works of artists from the Czech Republic, Mexico, Pakistan, South Africa, UK and USA. The artworks contested the perceptions of hazardous chemicals and wastes.

== Cooperation ==
The Safe Planet Campaign is collaborating with stakeholders that are cooperating on achieving sound chemicals and waste management. It works with:

- Basel and Stockholm Convention regional centers
- UN Commission on Sustainable Development (CSD)
- Food and Agriculture Organization of the United Nations (FAO)
- Kyiv Protocol on Pollutant Release and Transfer Registers to the Aarhus Convention on Access to Information, Public Participation in Decision-making and Access to Justice in Environmental Matters (UNECE Aarhus Convention)
- Montreal Protocol on Substances that Deplete the Ozone Layer
- UN Framework Convention on Climate Change (UNFCCC)
- UN Regional Commissions
- UNEP and FAO regional and sub-regional offices
- UNEP / DTIE Chemicals Branch
- World Health Organization

The Campaign cooperates with specific programmes and initiatives as well, including the Basel Wastes Solutions Circle, Green Customs Initiative, International POPs Elimination Network (IPEN), OzonAction, and Partnership for Action on Computing Equipment (PACE), PCBs Elimination Network (PEN), Strategic Approach to International Chemicals Management (SAICM), as well as academic, business and community-based organizations.

== See also ==
- Basel Convention
- Food and Agriculture Organization
- Rotterdam Convention
- Stockholm Convention on Persistent Organic Pollutants
- United Nations Environment Programme
- World Health Organization
