= PPSMI =

Malaysian education policy, introduced 2003

Pengajaran dan Pembelajaran Sains dan Matematik Dalam Bahasa Inggeris (PPSMI, Malay for the teaching and learning of science and mathematics in English) is a government policy aimed at improving the command of the English language among pupils at primary and secondary schools in Malaysia. In accordance to this policy, the Science and Mathematics subjects are taught in the English medium as opposed to the Malay medium used before. This policy was introduced in 2003 by the then-Prime Minister of Malaysia, Mahathir Mohamad.

The programme has been a highly controversial subject of debate among academics, politicians and the public alike due to questions of competence and English fluency levels among appointed teachers. A working paper from the World Bank later concluded such issues within the programme had negatively affected students' retention and aptitude of taught mathematic and science lessons regardless of whether their native languages are Malay or otherwise. This culminated to the announcement of the policy's reversal in 2012 by the Deputy Prime Minister, Muhyiddin Yassin.

== History ==
=== Background ===
Educational institutions in British colonies that eventually formed Malaya and later Malaysia had been long stratified by the language of teaching. The British had provided infrastructure of secondary schools which taught primarily in English but were concentrated in urban areas born to facilitate accumulation of profit from tin industries for the imperial project, the distances disadvantaged many among rural Malay populations who were only able to afford Malay-medium primary schools designed "to make the son of the fisherman or peasant a more intelligent fisherman or peasant than his father had been". English medium schools were also more equipped with better facilities and trained workforce which were supported by families with higher incomes than those attending Malay ones. By the 1940s, English to the Malay rural working class became a perceived marker of socioeconomic elitism yielded by the Malay aristocrat and Chinese trader classes who could afford that English-medium education.

=== Policy ===
PPSMI's inception as a Malaysian Government policy was the result of the Cabinet meeting on 19 July 2002 under the administration of the fourth prime minister, Mahathir Mohamad. According to the Malaysian Ministry of Education, the policy would be run in stages, starting with the 2003 school session, pioneered by the all students of Year 1 in primary education level, and Form 1 of the secondary education level. PPSMI was then fully implemented to all secondary students in 2007, and to all primary students in 2008.

== Objective ==
According to the statement regarding PPSMI in the Ministry of Education's website:

The rationale for the decision to change the medium of instruction from the Malay Language to English for the teaching and learning of Science and Mathematics subjects was made based on the government’s concern on the nation’s human capital development towards achieving the standard of a developed country, as well as an early preparation to compete in the era of globalization.

It is widely known that the field of science and mathematics form the basis and have a crucial role in the progress and development of a country. Various innovations and discoveries in these two fields happen rapidly and information access is mostly in the English language.

English language is also the language spoken internationally and mastery in this language would allow easy access to information in these fields.

In conclusion, the policy decision to implement PPSMI was made to ensure students’ mastery in science and mathematics in view of the fact that most of the sources are available in the English language. Indirectly, it is also hoped that the implementation of PPSMI would contribute to the enhancing of students’ command of the language.

When proposing the policy, Mahathir was in the opinion that Malaysia's progress is declining in the age of globalisation, and he had hoped that this policy gives a competitive edge to the nation, following the footsteps of Singapore and India which are moving forward because of their utilisation of the English language.

== Implementation ==
PPSMI was implemented for the 2003 school session students enrolling in Year 1 and Form 1 in primary and secondary schools respectively. Students of other grades are not affected, and continued to study Mathematics and Science in the mother tongue. PPSMI learning materials were offered in the form of packages consisting of these components:

- Textbooks: Given to students as the basic source for learning on concepts and skills in Science and Mathematics.
- Activity Books: Given as supplementary material for students to practice their understanding of the concepts learned from textbooks. These "Buku Latihan dan Aktiviti" or "BLA" were provided for students of Year 1 only.
- Teacher's Guide: Material prepared for teachers as reference and guide to plan and implement effective teaching of the Science and Mathematics.
- MyCD or "Pupil's CD-ROM": "BLA" in the form of multimedia presentations recorded in compacts discs and included with every Activity Book. The contents consists of an interactive games and simulators as well as electronic tests.
- Teacher's CD-ROM: This material was meant to help teachers to plan and implement effective teaching of the Science and Mathematics. Among the contents are questions banks, additional activities as well as URLs to websites with relevance to the subject. These CDs are included in the Teacher's Guide.
- Science Practical Book: Published to ensure that Science are taught not only in theory but also in practice.
- Glossary Book: A reference guide containing definition to terms pervasive in Science and Mathematics.

As for the implementation in Chinese schools, after a protest was made by the nation's union of Chinese schools Dong Jiao Zong, a compromise was reached where the teaching of Science and Mathematics was made done both in English and Mandarin.

== See also ==
- Gerakan Mansuhkan PPSMI
- First premiership of Mahathir Mohamad
