= Workplace health surveillance =

Ongoing surveillance of workers' health

Workplace health surveillance or occupational health surveillance (U.S.) is the ongoing systematic collection, analysis, and dissemination of exposure and health data on groups of workers. The Joint ILO/WHO Committee on Occupational Health at its 12th Session in 1995 defined an occupational health surveillance system as "a system which includes a functional capacity for data collection, analysis and dissemination linked to occupational health programmes".

The concept is new to occupational health and is frequently confused with medical screening. Health screening refers to the early detection and treatment of diseases associated with particular occupations, while workplace health surveillance refers to the removal of the causative factors.

== Aspects ==
=== Medical surveillance ===
A video about medical testing at a workplace as part of a NIOSH Health Hazard Evaluation Program investigation

The mission of a medical surveillance program is to keep workers healthy and ensure that employers are meeting OSHA standards in health and safety. Medical surveillance has an emphasis on prevention: it is designed to detect potential workplace hazards before irreversible health effects can occur. Clinicians with expertise in occupational health, industrial exposures, and respiratory protection screen workers with physical examinations, blood testing, spirometry (a measurement lung function), and audiometry. Screenings are performed at set intervals, often annually. The clinicians providing medical surveillance services include board-certified occupational and environmental medicine physicians, mid-level practitioners, nurses, and NIOSH-certified spirometry technicians.

Medical surveillance targets actual health events or a change in a biologic function of an exposed person or persons. Medical surveillance is a second line of defense behind the implementation of direct hazard controls such as engineering controls, administrative controls, and personal protective equipment. NIOSH recommends the medical surveillance of workers when they are exposed to hazardous materials. The elements of a medical surveillance program generally include the following:

1. An initial medical examination and collection of medical and occupational histories
2. Periodic medical examinations at regularly scheduled intervals, including specific medical screening tests when warranted
3. More frequent and detailed medical examinations as indicated on the basis of findings from these examinations
4. Post-incident examinations and medical screening following uncontrolled or non-routine increases in exposures such as spills
5. Worker training to recognize symptoms of exposure to a given hazard
6. A written report of medical findings
7. Employer actions in response to identification of potential hazards

When the purpose of a medical surveillance program is to detect early signs of work-related illness and disease, it is considered a type of medical screening, to detect preclinical changes in organ function or changes before a person would normally seek medical care and when intervention is beneficial The establishment of a medical screening program should follow established criteria, and specific disease endpoints must be able to be determined by the test selected.

Medical examinations and tests are used in many workplaces to determine whether an employee is able to perform the essential functions of the job. Medical surveillance of workers is also required by law in the United States when there is exposure to a specific workplace hazard, and OSHA has a number of standards that require medical surveillance of workers In addition to substance-specific standards, OSHA has standards with broader applicability. For example, employers must follow the medical evaluation requirements of OSHA's respiratory protection standard (29 CFR 1910.134) when respirators are necessary to protect worker health. Likewise, the OSHA standard for occupational exposure to hazardous chemicals in laboratories (29 CFR 1910.1450) requires medical consultation following the accidental release of hazardous chemicals. NIOSH also recommends medical surveillance, including screening, of workers when there is exposure to certain occupational hazards.

=== Hazard surveillance ===
Hazard surveillance involves identifying potentially hazardous practices or exposures in the workplace and assessing the extent to which they can be linked to workers, the effectiveness of controls, and the reliability of exposure measures. Workplace hazards can be chemical, biological, physical, ergonomic, psychosocial, or safety-related in nature. Hazard surveillance is an essential component of any occupational health surveillance effort and is used for defining the elements of the risk management program. Critical elements of a risk management program include recognizing potential exposures and taking appropriate actions to minimize them (for example, implementing engineering controls, employing good work practices, and using personal protective equipment). Hazard surveillance should include the identification of work tasks and processes that involve the production and use of hazardous materials, and should be viewed as one of the most critical components of any risk management program.

Hazard surveillance includes elements of hazard and exposure assessment. The hazard assessment involves reviewing the best available information concerning toxicity of materials. Such an assessment may come from databases, texts, and published literature or available regulations or guidelines. Human studies, such as epidemiologic investigations and case series or reports, and animal studies may also provide valuable information. The exposure assessment involves evaluating relevant exposure routes (inhalation, ingestion, dermal, and/or injection), amount, duration, and frequency (i.e., dose), as well as whether exposure controls are in place and how protective they are. When data are not available, this will be a qualitative process.

== Occupational Health Indicators (OHIs) ==
In 1998, the Council of State and Territorial Epidemiologists (CSTE) joined the CDC's National Institute for Occupational Safety and Health (NIOSH) to form the Occupational Health Surveillance Work Group in order to prioritize occupational health conditions to be placed under surveillance. The Work Group recommended that states use 19 occupational health indicators based on the availability of easily obtainable statewide data, the public health importance of the occupational health effect or exposure, and the potential for intervention activities.

These indicators are useful in assessing the ongoing policies and preventive measures but they also have some limitations. Among the major limitations are the underreporting of occupational health disorders, the inability to recognize potential occupational association of the disorder by health care workers, difficulties in attributing diseases with long latency or multiple causes (such as lung cancer) to occupational exposures, exclusion of special populations (such as self-employed or military personnel), and differences between state-specific databases.

=== Data Sources ===
Data for the OHIs come from multiple sources including:

- Death certificates, with contributing and underlying causes of death, which all states send to the National Vital Statistics System in CDC's National Center for Health Statistics
- Cancer registries, such as the North American Association of Central Cancer Registries
- Survey of occupational injuries and illnesses, with results provided in the Bureau of Labor Statistics (BLS) Annual Survey of Occupational Injuries and Illnesses
- BLS Census of Fatal Occupational Injuries
- Poison Control Centers (PCCs), which submit real-time data to the American Association of Poison Control Centers for inclusion in the Toxic Exposure Surveillance System
- Adult Blood Lead Epidemiology and Surveillance (ABLES)
- OSHA's Integrated Management Information System (IMIS), which maintains worksite inspection data to determine compliance with health and safety standards

== Tools ==
The usefulness of a surveillance tool may depend on what hazards are present in the workplace and the health effects those hazards may cause. For example, hearing tests will be helpful when noise exposures are present, while tests assessing lung function or biomonitoring may be useful when airborne agents are present. It is also important to distinguish between tools using medical surveillance (measuring health effects) and hazard surveillance/exposure assessment (physical measurements of the type and severity of hazard present). Periodic testing, including a baseline exam when an employee is hired, can often help detect a decline in function by comparing previous results.

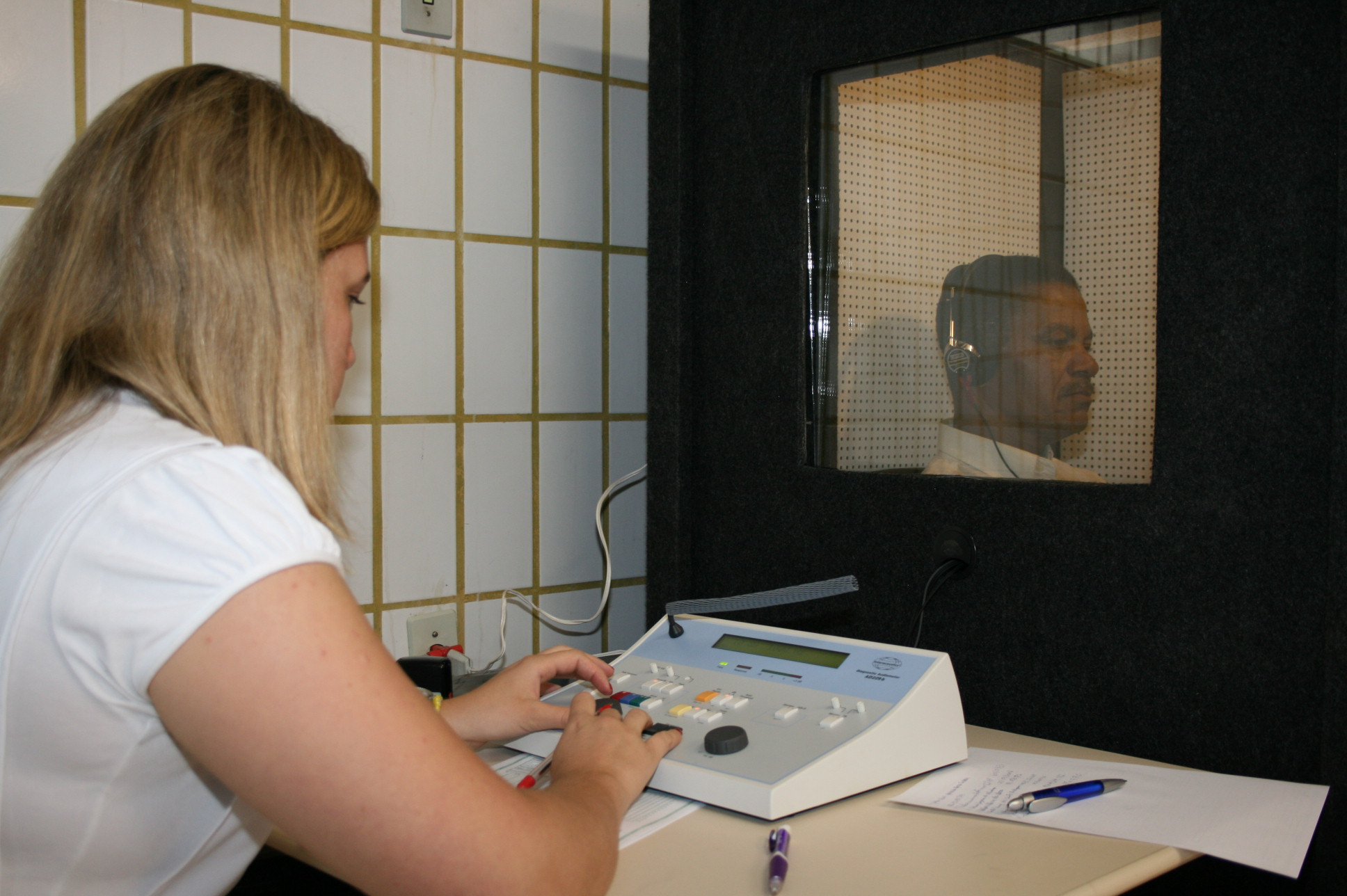
Hearing exam

Medical surveillance tools

- General
  - Epidemiological cohort and case–control studies investigate associations between causative agents and specific health effects.
  - Physical examinations assess the overall well-being of the worker and identify health-related issues.
- Chemical or particulate exposures
  - Pulmonary function testing is a way to measure lung function. It can assist in the early detection of occupational lung diseases and provides information about the severity and staging of asthma and other restrictive lung diseases.
    - Spirometry tests measure how quickly air can be pushed out from the lungs and is useful in evaluating diseases that cause obstruction to flow.
    - Plethysmography measures lung volume by having the subject perform breathing tests inside of an air tight box.
    - Flow rates can be measured by asking subjects to blow air out of the lungs as fast and as hard as possible from their largest inhaled breathe (inspiration) to the maximum exhaled breathe (expiration). The volume exhaled in the first second is called the forced expiratory volume in one second (FEV1). These flow rates can be indicators of disease that cause obstruction to airflow, such as asthma, chronic bronchitis, and emphysema.
  - Biomonitoring measures total body burden of a hazardous chemical in a worker via analysis of biological specimens such as urine or blood. Non-invasive procedures are preferred when possible.
- Noise exposures
  - Audiometry remains the mainstay of diagnosis of noise-induced hearing loss, which is the most common reported occupational disease in all parts of the world.
- Other
  - Hand arm assessment (vibration) and dermatological assessments (chemical) are other important tools for workplace health surveillance.

== Confidentiality of information ==
Most countries have specific regulations for individual health data, which require that the worker be informed if this information is ever shared with any third party. Occupational Health Records (OHR) have the same protections as any medical record that has confidential health information. Employers must store OHR in a secured area free from unauthorized access, use, or disclosure. Workers should have the right to access this information whenever they wish.
