= Biomonitoring =

Measurement of toxic chemical substances

In analytical chemistry, biomonitoring is the measurement of the body burden of toxic chemical compounds, elements, or their metabolites, in biological substances. Often, these measurements are done in blood and urine. Biomonitoring is performed in both environmental health, and in occupational safety and health as a means of exposure assessment and workplace health surveillance.

The two best established environmental biomonitoring programs in representative samples of the general population are those of the United States and Germany, although population-based programs exist in a few other countries. In 2001, the U.S. Centers for Disease Control and Prevention (CDC) began to publish its biennial National Report on Human Exposure to Environmental Chemicals, which reports a statistically representative sample of the U.S. population.

== Overview ==
Biomonitoring involves the use of organisms to assess environmental contamination, such as of surrounding air or water. It can be done qualitatively by observing and noting changes in organisms, or quantitatively by measuring accumulation of chemicals in organism tissues. By observing or measuring the effects the environment has on its resident organisms, pollution may be suspected or inferred.

Historically, public health regulations have been based on theoretical risk calculations according to known levels of chemical substances in air, water, soil, food, other consumer products and other sources of potential exposure. Human biomonitoring offers the opportunity to analyze the actual internal levels of bodily substances from all potential routes of exposure at one time, which may contribute to improving risk assessments.

Scientific advancements have made it possible to detect a greater number of chemical substances in smaller concentrations in the body, with some chemicals detectable at levels as low as parts per trillion. A single biomonitoring measurement is only one snapshot in time and may not accurately reflect the level of exposure over longer periods.

The presence of an environmental chemical in the body does not necessarily indicate harm. The analytical chemistry of detecting chemicals has advanced more rapidly than the ability to interpret the potential health consequences. Health risks are usually established from toxicity studies in laboratory animals and epidemiological evidence in humans. Lead is a well studied chemical with a CDC action level of concern, currently at 10 μg/dL, or 100 parts per billion, in blood; however, neurobehavioral impairment has been noted below this level. Because this approach requires establishment of cause and effect in epidemiological studies and a thorough understanding of human dose response, data to support these types of action levels exist for only a few environmental chemicals. The concept of Biomonitoring Equivalents (BEs) has been developed as an alternative approach to aid in interpreting and communicating biomonitoring results in the context of potential risks to health.

There are different types of biomarkers that indicate exposure, effect, or susceptibility.

== Methodology ==
Chemicals and their metabolites can be detected in a variety of biological substances such as blood, urine, exhaled air, hair, nails, feces, semen, breast milk, or saliva. Blood and urine are the most commonly used in occupational safety and health.

Breast milk is a favored matrix (substance) to measure lipophilic (fat-loving) persistent, bioaccumulative, and toxic (PBT) compounds during lactation; this exposure route is dominant for breastfeeding children. A lipophilic compound might also be detected in blood, while a hydrophilic (water-loving) compound might be detected in urine.

Analytical methods used by the CDC include isotope dilution mass spectrometry, inductively coupled plasma mass spectrometry, or graphite furnace atomic absorption spectrometry. Others include gas chromatography or high-performance liquid chromatography coupled with various detectors such as ultraviolet, electron capture, flame ionization, atomic emission, or mass spectrometric detectors. Ligand-binding assays and immunoassays are also used.

As biomonitoring necessarily involves working with human subjects and specimens, biosafety procedures are necessary to prevent the transmission of pathogens.

== Biomonitoring equivalents ==
Scientists performing biomonitoring testing are able to detect and measure concentrations of natural and manmade chemicals in human blood and urine samples at parts-per-billion to parts-per-quadrillion levels. A 2006 U.S. National Research Council report found that while scientists were capable of detecting the chemicals at these levels, methods for interpreting and communicating what their presence meant regarding potential health risks to an individual or population were still lacking. The report recommended that scientific research be done to improve the interpretation and communication of biomonitoring results through the use of existing risk assessments of specific chemicals.

To address this situation, several groups recognized that exposure guidance values, such as reference dose and tolerable daily intake, could, with sufficient data, be translated into corresponding estimates of biomarker concentrations for use in the interpretation of biomonitoring data. In 2007, the initial methodology for the systematic translation of exposure guidance values into corresponding screening values for biomonitoring data, dubbed Biomonitoring Equivalents, was published by scientists from Summit Toxicology. Subsequently, an expert panel from government, industry and academia, convened to develop detailed guidelines for deriving and communicating these Biomonitoring Equivalents.

Biomonitoring Equivalents can be used for evaluation of biomonitoring data in a risk assessment context. Comparing biomonitoring data for a chemical with its Biomonitoring Equivalent provides a means for assessing whether population exposures to chemicals are within or above the levels considered safe by regulatory agencies. Biomonitoring Equivalents can thus assist scientists and risk managers in the prioritization of chemicals for follow-up or risk management activities.

Since 2007, scientists have derived and published Biomonitoring Equivalents for more than 110 chemicals, including cadmium, benzene, chloroform, arsenic, toluene, methylene chloride, triclosan, dioxins, volatile organic compounds, and others. Several have been developed through collaborations of scientists from the U.S. Environmental Protection Agency, CDC and Health Canada. Researchers from the German Human Biomonitoring Commission have also proposed a concept for deriving screening values similar to Biomonitoring Equivalents.

== Communication ==
The National Research Council's 2006 report emphasized that accurate communication of results is essential for the proper use of biomonitoring surveys, but at the same time noted "there is no accepted standard for good biomonitoring communications". In 2007, the Boston University School of Public Health organized a panel on this topic.

An expert panel on Biomonitoring Equivalents has published guidelines for communicating information to the general public and health care providers.

Charles McKay of the Connecticut Poison Control Center is interviewed in a video titled "A Medical Doctor's Perspective on Biomonitoring", which is focused on helping the general public better understand biomonitoring.

== Biomonitoring in environmental health ==
In 2006 the U.S. National Research Council published a report, Human Biomonitoring for Environmental Chemicals. The report recognized the value of biomonitoring for better understanding exposure to environmental chemicals, and included several findings and recommendations to improve the utility of biomonitoring data for health risk assessment. In summary, the report called for more rigorous health-based criteria for selecting chemicals to include in biomonitoring studies; the development of tools and techniques to improve risk-based interpretation and communication of biomonitoring data; integration of biomonitoring into exposure assessment and epidemiological research; and exploration of bioethical issues around biomonitoring, including informed consent, confidentiality of results, and others.

The issue of exposure to environmental chemicals has received attention as a result of televised reports by Bill Moyers for PBS and Anderson Cooper for CNN's "Planet in Peril" series. The book Our Stolen Future, with a foreword by former Vice President Al Gore, also raised awareness by focusing on endocrine disruption.

Surveys of human exposure to chemicals do not usually integrate the number of chemical compounds detected per person and the concentration of each compound. This leaves untested relevant exposure situations; e.g., whether individuals with low concentrations of some compounds have high concentrations of the other compounds. Analyses of the concentrations of a given compound usually show that most citizens have much lower concentrations than a certain minority. A study based on a representative sample of the population of Catalonia (Spain), which integrated the number of compounds detected per person and the concentration of each compound, found that more than half of the population had concentrations in the top quartile of 1 or more of the 19 persistent toxic substances (PTS) (pesticides, PCBs) analyzed. Significant subgroups of the population accumulated PTS mixtures at high concentrations. For instance, 48% of women 60–74 years had concentrations of 6 or more PTS in the top quartile; half of the entire population had levels of 1 to 5 PTS above 500 ng/g, and less than 4% of citizens had all PTS in the lowest quartile. Thus, PTS concentrations appear low in most of the population only when each individual compound is looked at separately. It is not accurate to state that most of the population has low concentrations of PTS. The assessment of mixture effects must address the fact that most individuals are contaminated by PTS mixtures made of compounds at both low and high concentrations.

=== Surveys by country ===
==== United States ====
- In the United States, the CDC first tested samples from the general population for lead and a few pesticides in 1976. In the late 1990s, the National Health and Nutrition Examination Survey (NHANES) program had a major expansion.
- National Report on Human Exposure to Environmental Chemicals

The CDC's Division of Laboratory Sciences within the National Center for Environmental Health has developed a National Biomonitoring Program, and has published the biennial National Report on Human Exposure to Environmental Chemicals since 2001. As the selection of chemicals is controversial, the CDC has identified influential criteria:Evidence of exposure in a U.S. population, presence and significance of health effects after a given level of exposure, desire to track public health initiatives to reduce exposure to a given agent, existing method for accurately measuring biologically relevant concentrations of the chemical, sufficient tissue specimens, in particular, blood and/or urine samples and cost-effectiveness.

CDC established three criteria for removing chemicals from future surveys: a new replacement chemical (i.e., a metabolite or other chemical) is more representative of exposure than the chemical currently measured, or if after three survey periods, detection rates for all chemicals within a method-related group are less than 5 percent for all population subgroups (i.e., two sexes, three race/ethnicity groups, and the age groups used in the National Report), or if after three survey periods, levels of chemicals within a method-related group are unchanged or declining in all demographic subgroups documented in the National Report.

- The National Children's Study plans to follow 100,000 children across the United States from birth until age 21. The study was authorized as part of the Children's Health Act of 2000 as the largest effort undertaken to address the effects of social, economic and environmental factors on a child's health. the CDC's Environmental Health Laboratory announced in 2009 it would play a key role in the biomonitoring of the ongoing National Children's Study. In collaboration with the National Institute of Child Health and Development, National Institute of Environmental Health Sciences and U.S. Environmental Protection Agency.
- Some U.S. states have received federal support and established biomonitoring programs. In 2001, the CDC awarded planning grants to 33 states to assist in capacity building for expanding biomonitoring.
  - The California Environmental Contaminant Biomonitoring Program (CECBP) was established by law in 2006 and is administered by the California Department of Public Health.
  - Minnesota's Biomonitoring Pilot Program was established by law in 2007 and is run by the Minnesota Department of Health.

==== Germany ====
The German Environmental Survey (GerES) has been performed since 1985, and in 1992 the Human Biomonitoring Commission of the German Federal Environment Agency was established.

==== Canada ====
Statistics Canada administers the Canadian Health Measures Survey, which includes biomonitoring for environmental chemicals. Health Canada administers a program called Mother-Infant Research on Environmental Chemicals, which focuses on 2,000 pregnant women and their infants.

== Occupational biomonitoring ==
In occupational safety and health, biomonitoring may be done for reasons of regulatory compliance, workplace health surveillance and research, confirming effectiveness of hazard controls, or as a component of occupational risk assessment. It can also be used to reconstruct exposures following acute or accidental events, and to assess the effectiveness of personal protective equipment. It is useful for dermal exposures, for which sampling methods are often not readily available, and for finding unexpected exposures or routes. There are also biomarkers not just for chemical hazards, but also other types such as noise and stress. Occupational health differs from environmental health in that the former has smaller number of exposed individuals, but with a wider range of exposure levels.

Biomonitoring is complementary to exposure monitoring in that it measures the internal dose of a toxicant within the body rather than its concentration outside the body, with the advantage that it confirms whether not only exposure but uptake has actually occurred. It also takes into account differences in metabolism, physical exertion, and mixtures of toxicants between individuals that affect the internal dose. It can be done in an individual or collective manner.

A major use of occupational toxicology data is for determining what biomarkers (including both the a toxicant and its metabolites) may be used for biomonitoring, and establishing biological exposure indices. These are used during exposure assessment and workplace health surveillance activities to identify overexposure, and to test the validity of occupational exposure limits. These biomarkers are intended to aid in prevention by identifying early adverse affects, unlike diagnostics for clinical medicine that are designed to reveal advanced pathologic states.

In the United States, the Occupational Safety and Health Administration as of 2017 has three regulations that require biomonitoring: after exposure to benzene in an unplanned release, and for employees exposed to cadmium or lead at or above a specified level over a specified amount of time. In the European Union, biological limit values are health-based, while biological guidance values are statistically derived and indicate background exposures in the general population. As of 2020 lead is the only substance that has a binding biological limit value in the EU. Voluntary lists of biological exposure limits or action levels are maintained by the American Conference of Governmental Industrial Hygienists, German Research Foundation, UK Health and Safety Executive, France's ANSES, and the Swiss Accident Insurance Fund. Biomonitoring for research purposes is performed by the U.S. National Institute for Occupational Safety and Health as part of its Adult Blood Lead Epidemiology and Surveillance program, as well as other occupational health studies.

== See also ==
- Biomarker
- Pharmacokinetics
- Exposure assessment
- Dose-response relationship
- Toxicology
- Safe Planet
