= Gerakan Mansuhkan PPSMI =

Gerakan Mansuhkan PPSMI (GMP) is a coalition of 40 NGOs and political parties in Malaysia, which campaigns to abolish Pengajaran dan Pembelajaran Sains dan Matematik Dalam Bahasa Inggeris (PPSMI) in Malaysia education policy. Its leader is Dato’ Dr. Hassan Ahmad, ex-director of Dewan Bahasa dan Pustaka. PPSMI is a Malaysian government policy at primary and secondary schools in Malaysia to improve English fluency among Malaysian pupils. All science and mathematics are to be taught in English medium instead of the Bahasa Melayu medium as before. This policy was introduced in 2003 by Malaysian ex-prime minister, Mahathir Mohamad.
