= Exposure science =

Exposure science is the study of the contact between humans (and other organisms) and harmful agents within their environment – whether it be chemical, physical, biological, behavioural or mental stressors – with the aim of identifying the causes and preventions of the adverse health effects they result in. This can include exposure within the home, workplace, outdoors or any other environment an individual may encounter. The term 'exposure' is the umbrella term for many different types, ranging from ultraviolet exposure, exposure to the chemicals in the food we eat, to exposure to long working hours being the occupational factor most attributable to the burden of disease.

The need for the field arises from the expansive range of exposures which have resulted in negative health outcomes for humans and other organisms, and mainly focus on the relationship between external exposure, internal exposure and dose. By tightly integrating the fields of epidemiology, toxicology, biochemistry, environmental science and risk assessment, holistic comprehension of an exposure is achieved to protect human and ecosystem health on an individual, community and global levels. Though the history of exposure science had an initial slow start, developments have significantly accelerated in the past three decades, including the beginnings of the formation of the "exposome". However, there is still much unknown and research in the field is only expanding to cover the increasing amount of identified exposures.

== Need ==
The essentiality of exposure science research extends from the wide range of adverse health outcomes which burden the population. The World Health Organisation predicts that approximately 24% to 40% of the global disease burden is the result of environmental factors, representing the major health burden in developed countries, and indoor smoke from cooking fuels causes 3.8 million deaths every year. Other morbidities and mortalities as a result of exposure also include cancers (for example, melanoma from UV exposure), autism (linked to high levels of air pollution), Parkinson's (linked to nitric oxide exposure), and cell damage which causes diabetes, cardiovascular diseases and lung diseases.

Since research began, there has been many breakthroughs which have improved and protected the health of individuals. An example is the link between UV exposure to the development of all three major forms of skin cancer, which ultimately led to the development of preventions like sunscreen awareness. Exposure to prenatal infections (for example, influenza, rubella) has been linked increased risks of autism and schizophrenia. The development of clothing and materials which protect health care workers from infection exposure, and firefighters from heat exposure, has led to increased protection within these occupations.

However, it is not only human health that exposure science aims to understand and protect, and there are many documented cases where exposure to human activity harms the environment. In 2003, it was discovered that liver damage in fish in Puget Sound (Washington State) was linked to water contamination with polycyclic aromatic hydrocarbons found in coal and gasoline. Majorly, there has also been the discovery of the depletion of the ozone layer as a result of chlorofluorocarbons and halons found in refrigerators, air conditioners, aircraft halons and aerosol cans. The production of greenhouse gases from sources such as transport and agriculture has been strongly linked to global warming, which is subsequently causing rising sea-levels and damage to the environments in which many species live within.

== History ==
One of the earliest accounts of exposure research was conducted by Hippocrates in 400 BC, when he published 'Air, Water, and Places' describing that air, water, food and living quality influenced the prevalence of human disease. Following well into the late 1900s (AD), there became more and more studies published, such as the link between water contamination and cholera in London in 1855. However, one of the note worth publications which laid the foundations for the expansion of exposure science into what it has become today was the 'Human Exposure Assessments for Airborne Pollutants: Advances and Opportunities' by the National Research Council. It was the first to "define the core principals of exposure assessment", and has resulted in increased investments in exposome technologies, growing exposure science programs like HELIX and the National Exposure Research Laboratory. The most recent development in exposure science is the shifted focus onto the development of an 'exposome' to match the already underway construction of the complete 'genome'.

== Source-to-disease pathway ==
Understanding the source-to-disease pathway of exposure provides a holistic picture of where the exposure originates and results in harm upon the organism, quoted by Paul Lioy and Kirk Smith (2021) as "exposure science links directly to the sources that might be controlled and to the internal environment of the organisms that are of concern".

The exposure source can be categorised as exogenous (external) or endogenous (internal) sources. Exogenous sources refer to examples such as radiation, air pollutants, food and social interactions. Endogenous sources refer to examples such as gut microflora, oxidative stress and emotional stress. It is recognised that internal exposure sources can be the result of prior external sources. For example, exposure to vitamin B12 deficient diets can cause hyperhomocysteinemia, which increases oxidative stress within the body leading to the possible development of vascular dementia and stroke. Identifying the source is essential for determining the factor which has the potential to cause harmful effects upon a human or other organisms. It is also an indicator of which specific fields to incorporate into the studies of their effects. For example, diet related exposures would involve input from nutritionists, however, exposure to radiation would not, involving a chemist instead.

Contact refers to the location or method in which the organism becomes exposed to the source. For example, risk of contact with solar UV exposure only occurs during the daytime, not at night. A human (or other organism) coming in contact with exposures transitions with different environments, or could alter the dose or frequency of contact with a source. Establishing contacts allows researchers to identify how they may become avoided or reduced. For example, banning peanut foods (e.g. peanut butter) within schools reduces the chance of a child with a peanut allergy from coming in contact unawares, therefore preventing a reaction.

Once in contact with the exposure, the route is the pathway in which the exposure reaches areas of the organism where it has the potential to cause damage. Common route examples include inhalation, ingestion, skin absorption or wound contamination. The route can determine the velocity in which harmful exposure can occur, where inhalation is considered the fastest route of exposure uptake, followed by dermal contact and ingestion.

The term "dose" is often used interchangeably with the term "exposure", or referred to as exposure dose, target dose, internal dose or external dose to name a few. Measuring the dose of the exposure required to cause harm is essential for determining the threshold in which the amount of exposure exceeds being harmless and becomes toxic. This is where the field of exposure science ties directly with toxicology. The dose can also involve the period of time in which the organism is exposed: the more time exposed, the higher the dose and greater potential it exceeds the threshold.

If a dose exceeds it's toxicity threshold, it has the potential to cause some biological effect which results in disease within the organism. The adverse health effects caused by exposure is the ultimate reason why the field of exposure science emerged.

== The 'exposome' concept ==
The concept of the exposome was first defined by Christopher Paul Wild as the "life-course environmental exposures (including lifestyle factors), from the prenatal period onwards." However, similar definitions have been modified from this, including Miller and Jones, who redefined the exposome as "the cumulative measure of environmental influences and associated biological responses throughout the lifespan, including exposures from the environment, diet, behaviour, and endogenous processes." The study of the exposome has now been termed 'exposomics' in reference to all the technologies used to study the environment, cells and chemicals of an organism.

The idea stemmed from the pre-existing concept of the 'genome', the complete set of genetically encoded instructions which function the body, of which Wild focussed on throughout his career in exposure assessment and cancer genomics. Understanding the genome has led to the ability to predict those who are predisposed to certain chronic diseases. In his research field, Christopher Wild identifies environmental exposure as the core influencer and mystery of cancer incidence. He concluded the need for the 'exposome', like the genome, to map the complete set of environmental exposures a human encounters throughout the course of their lifetime in order to easily prevent and identify sources of exposure-caused chronic diseases, along with target age groups.

In 2012, Wild continued to extend his description of the exposome and its entailments. He includes internal bodily processes such as metabolism, hormones, microflora and oxidative stress, external exposures such as radiation, infectious agents and diet, and additionally social, economic and psychological exposures. Increased ease of genotyping and studying polymorphisms saw a major shift to gene-disease related studies in the 1990s and more recently new study designs allow researchers to follow increasing sample sizes. However, also in 2012, Wild went on to describe the realistic tools and methods one could use to effectively develop the exposome. This included biomarker omics (e.g. genomics, transcriptomics and immunomics), sensor technologies (e.g. using mobile phones to measure physical activity, stress, sleep rhythms) and imaging (for diets, social interactions).
