= Absorption (skin) =

Route by which substances can enter the body through the skin

Skin absorption is a route by which substances can enter the body through the skin. Along with inhalation, ingestion and injection, dermal absorption is a route of exposure for toxic substances and route of administration for medication. Absorption of substances through the skin depends on a number of factors, the most important of which are concentration, duration of contact, solubility of medication, and physical condition of the skin and part of the body exposed.

Skin (percutaneous, dermal) absorption is the transport of chemicals from the outer surface of the skin both into the skin and into circulation. Skin absorption relates to the degree of exposure to and possible effect of a substance which may enter the body through the skin. Human skin comes into contact with many agents intentionally and unintentionally. Skin absorption can occur from occupational, environmental, or consumer skin exposure to chemicals, cosmetics, or pharmaceutical products. Some chemicals can be absorbed in enough quantity to cause detrimental systemic effects. Skin disease (dermatitis) is considered one of the most common occupational diseases. In order to assess if a chemical can be a risk of either causing dermatitis or other more systemic effects and how that risk may be reduced, one must know the extent to which it is absorbed. Thus, dermal exposure is a key aspect of human health risk assessment.

== Factors influencing absorption ==
Along with inhalation, ingestion and injection, dermal absorption is a route of exposure for bioactive substances including medications. Absorption of substances through the skin depends on a number of factors:

- Concentration
- Molecular weight of the molecule
- Duration of contact
- Solubility of substance
- Physical condition of the skin
- Part of the body exposed including the amount of hair on the skin

In general, the rate of absorption of chemicals through skin follows the following scheme from fastest to slowest: Scrotal > Forehead > Armpit ≥ Scalp > Back = Abdomen > Palm = under surface of the foot.

== Structures influencing absorption ==
To be absorbed through the skin, a chemical must pass through the epidermis, glands, or hair follicles. Sweat glands and hair follicles make up about 0.1 to 1.0 percent of the total skin surface. Though small amounts of chemicals may enter the body rapidly through the glands or hair follicles, they are primarily absorbed through the epidermis. Chemicals must pass through the seven cell layers of epidermis before entering the dermis where they can enter the blood stream or lymph and circulate to other areas of the body. Toxins and toxicants can move through the layers by passive diffusion. The stratum corneum is the outermost layer of the epidermis and the rate-limiting barrier in absorption of an agent. Thus, how quickly something passes through this thicker outer layer determines the overall absorption. The stratum corneum is primarily composed of lipophilic cholesterol, cholesterol esters and ceramides. Thus lipid-soluble chemicals make it through the layer and into the circulation faster, however nearly all molecules penetrate it to some minimal degree. Absorption of chemicals in municipal water and dental products such as VOC (Volatile Organic Compounds), TTHM (Total Trihalomethanes), fluoride and disinfectants is a major exposure to environmental health hazards.

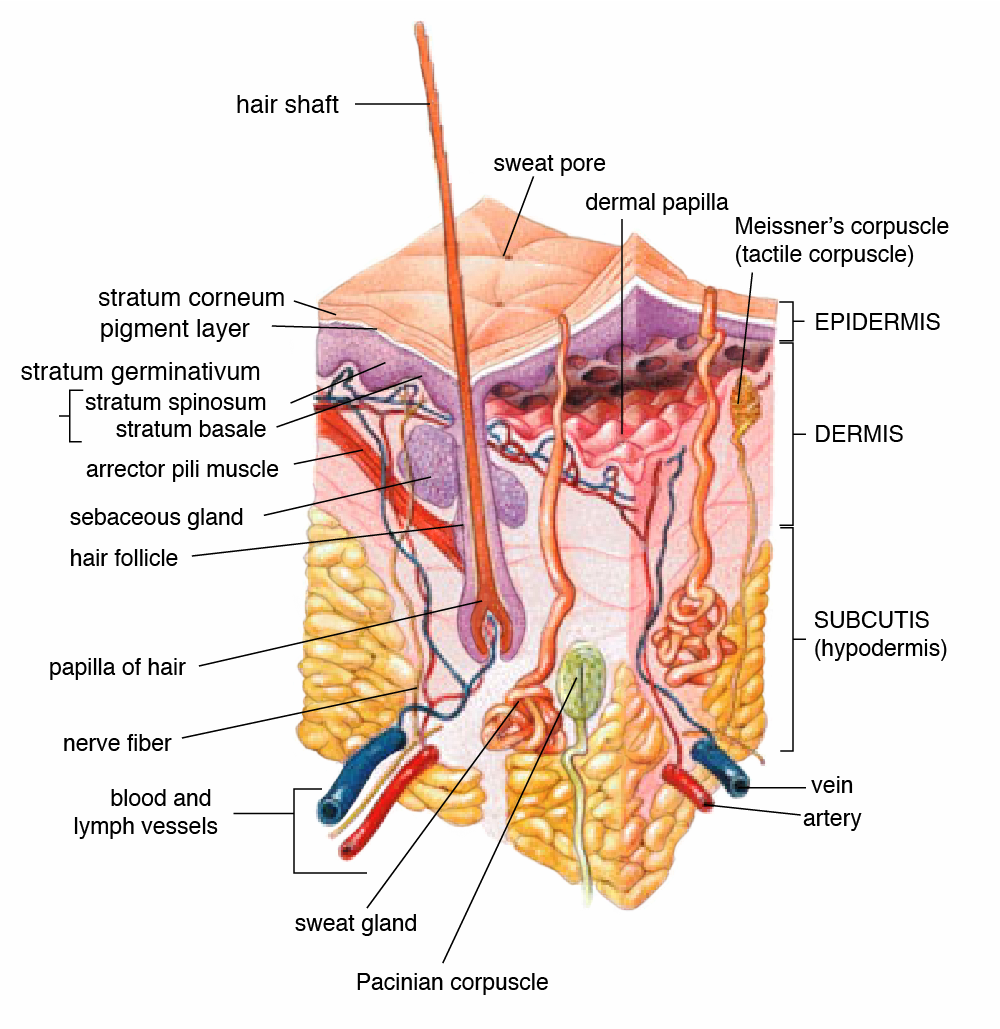
Diagram of skin structures

== Conditions affecting skin absorption ==
Agents that injure the stratum corneum, such as strong acids, are absorbed faster than chemicals that do not. Skin damage due to burns, abrasions, wounds and skin diseases also increase absorption. Thus populations with skin damage may be more susceptible to adverse effects of agents that are absorbed through the skin. Certain solvents like dimethyl sulfoxide (DMSO) act as carriers and are frequently used to transport medication through the skin. DMSO increases the permeability of the stratum corneum. Surfactants like sodium lauryl-sulfate increase the skin penetration of water-soluble substances, possibly by increasing the skin permeability of water.

== Medical use of skin absorption ==
Dermal application of a medication or chemical allows treatment to be localized, unlike ingestion or injection. Some medications seem to be more effective (or are more efficient) using the dermal route of administration. Some ingested drugs are heavily metabolized by the liver and may be inactivated, but using a dermal application bypasses this metabolic step allowing more parent compounds to enter the peripheral circulation. If a drug is absorbed well through the skin it may be used as a means of systemic medication. Dermal dosage forms include: liniments, braces, lotions, ointments, creams, dusting powders, aerosols, and transdermal patches. Specially designed patches are currently used to deliver fentanyl, nicotine and other compounds. Slower skin absorption versus oral or injectable may allow patches to provide medication for 1 to 7 days. For instance nitroglycerin given transdermally may provide hours of protection against angina whereas the duration of effect sublingually may only be minutes.

== Measurement of skin absorption ==
The amount of chemical that is absorbed through the skin can be measured directly or indirectly. Studies have shown there are species with differences in the absorption of different chemicals. Measurements in rats, rabbits or pigs may or may not reflect human absorption. Finding the rate at which agents penetrate the skin is important for assessing the risk from exposures.

=== In vivo ===
The transit of chemicals into the skin can be directly measured using non-invasive optical techniques with molecular specificity, such as Confocal Raman Spectroscopy. This technique is able to identify unique spectra of molecules and compare to background skin spectra whilst limiting measurement regions using confocal gating, achieving depth-resolved concentration measurement. A single measurement sequence can thereby establish a snapshot profile of chemical concentration against depth inside the skin. By repeating the measurement at multiple timepoints, a dynamic concentration-at-depth profile is determined. Since modern Raman Spectrometers exhibit extremely high SNR, in-vivo absorption testing in human skin is possible on a scale of a few minutes or hours.

A chemical may also be directly applied to the skin followed by blood and urine measurements, at set time points after the application, to assess the amount of chemical that entered the body. The concentration in the blood or urine at particular time points can be graphed to show an area under the curve and the extent and duration of absorption and distribution to provide a measure of systemic absorption. This can be done in animals or humans with a dry chemical powder or a chemical in solution. Rats are commonly used for these experiments. An area of skin is shaved before the chemical is applied. Often the area of chemical application is covered to prevent ingestion or rubbing off of the test material. Samples of blood and urine are taken at specific time intervals following application (0.5, 1, 2, 4, 10, and 24 hours) and in some protocols at the chosen end time the animal maybe necropsied. Tissue samples may also be evaluated for the presence of the test chemical. In some test protocols many animals may be tested and necropsies may occur at set intervals after exposure. Biomonitoring, such as taking urine samples at intervals, from workers exposed to chemicals may provide some information but it is difficult to distinguish dermal from inhalation exposure using this method.

=== Ex vivo ===
The permeability properties of the stratum corneum are, for the most part, unchanged after its removal from the body. Skin that has been removed carefully from animals may also be used to see the extent of local penetration by putting it in a chamber and applying the chemical on one side and then measuring the amount of chemical that gets into a fluid on the other side. One example of this ex vivo technique is the isolated perfused porcine flap. This method was first described in 1986 as a humane alternative to in vivo animal testing.

=== In vitro ===
Techniques such as static diffusion cells (Franz cells) and flow-through diffusion cells (Bronaugh cells) have also been used. The Franz Cell apparatus consists of two chambers separated by a membrane of animal or human skin. Human skin is preferred but due to ethical and other considerations is not always available. Human skin often may come from autopsies or plastic surgeries. The test product is applied to the membrane via the top chamber. The bottom chamber contains fluid from which samples are taken at regular intervals for analysis to determine the amount of active cells that has permeated the membrane at set time points.

Bronaugh cells are similar to Franz cells but use a flow-through system beneath the membrane layer and samples of the liquid below are taken continuously rather than at set time points. Bronaugh cells have been replaced with inline cells by some manufacturers.

=== Indirect measurement ===
It is sometimes impossible for humane reasons to apply a drug to the skin and measure its absorption. Sarin, a nerve gas, can be absorbed through intact skin and be lethal at low concentrations. Thus if one needs to assess the risk of Sarin exposure one must take skin absorption and other routes into account but one cannot ethically test Sarin on human subjects; thus ways of modeling the risk from skin exposure of the agent have been found.

Models are used in some instances to predict the amount of exposure or absorption and to assess public health hazards. In order to assess the risk of a chemical causing a health issue one must assess the chemical and the exposure. Exposure modeling depends on several factors and assumptions.

1. The surface area of skin exposed. The surface area of an adult is about 20,900 square centimeters (3,240 sq in) and the surface area of a child of 6 years is about 9,000 square centimeters (1,400 sq in). These figures and figures for other body parts or portions can be found in the EPA (Environmental Protection Agency) Exposures Handbook 1996 or estimated using other databases.
2. The duration of exposure (in hours, minutes, etc.).
3. The concentration of the chemical.
4. The permeability coefficient of the chemical (how easy it is for the chemical to get through the skin). This may be estimated using an octanol-water partitioning coefficient (a measurement of the uptake from aqueous solution into powdered stratum corneum).
5. The weight of the person. Standard weight of an adult 71.8 kilograms (158 lb), a 6-year-old child 22 kilograms (49 lb) and female of child-bearing age 60 kilograms (130 lb) are generally used.
6. The nature of the exposure, e.g. a cream applied to the whole body, to just a small area, or a bath in a dilute solution.

==== Skin contact with dry chemical ====
To calculate the dose of chemical a person is exposed to one must multiply the surface area of the skin exposed by the concentration of the chemical in the substance that comes into contact with the skin. Then multiply by the time in contact, by the permeability coefficients, and any unit conversion factors needed, then divide by the weight of the person.
A simple mathematical formula to estimate the dose for a single exposure is:

concentration of chemical × surface area exposed × permeability coefficient / body weight.

Models for this can be found in the EPA Standard Operating Procedures for Residential Exposure Assessment. These models establish guidelines for estimating pesticide exposure so that one can judge the risk and take appropriate actions if the risk is judged to be too great given the exposure.

==== Skin contact with chemical in solution (water, etc.) ====
This can be modeled similarly to the dry chemical but one has to take into account the amount of solution the skin comes into contact with. Three scenarios for exposure to chemicals in a solution have been proposed and modeled.
a. A person could be exposed partially to a solution for a period of time. For instance if one stood in contaminated flood water for a period of time, or one worked in a situation where the hands and lower arms were immersed in a solution for a period of time. This type of scenario depends on the skin area exposed and the duration of the exposure as well as the concentration of the chemical in the solution. One may have to adjust the absorption coefficients for the different area of the body as the feet are more calloused on the bottom and will allow less chemical through than the lower leg. The rate of absorption of chemicals follows the following general scheme from fastest to slowest: Scrotal > Forehead > Armpit ≥ Scalp > Back = Abdomen > Palm = under the surface of the foot. The dermal absorption of a dilute solution by partial leg or arm exposure has been modeled by Scharf. The EPA also has guidance on calculating the dermally absorbed doses of chemicals from contaminated water.
Mathematical formula:

Dermally absorbed dose rate = concentration in water × surface area exposed × exposure time × permeability coefficient × conversion factors.

b. The second scenario is total body immersion, such as swimming in a pool or lake. Exposure in swimming pools is only partially dermal and a SWIMODEL has been proposed. This model takes into account not only the skin exposure but also considers ocular, ingestion, inhalation, and mucous membrane exposure that may occur due to being totally immersed. A second model dealing primarily with skin absorption was created by Scharf to assess the risk of overspray of pesticide from aerial spraying on swimming pools. These models use whole body surface area rather than the surface area of specific parts for the mathematical input.
c. The third scenario is splash, or droplet exposure. This model takes into account that not all water carrying a chemical that comes into contact with skin stays on the skin long enough to allow absorption. Only that portion of a chemical in the solution that stays in contact with the skin is available for absorption. This may be modeled using water adherence factors as postulated by Gujral 2011.

==== Skin contact with gas or aerosol ====
This is a minor contributor and has been ignored in most risk assessments of chemicals as a route of exposure for gaseous or aerosolized toxicants. More research is needed in this area.

== Controlling skin absorption ==
If skin exposure and absorption are deemed to indicate a risk, various methods to reduce absorption can be undertaken.

- Labels of chemicals can be adapted to require the use of gloves or protective clothing.
- Warnings to wash immediately if the chemical comes into contact with skin can be made.
- Close pools or lakes to swimmers.
- Limit the exposure time to chemicals, i.e. workers can only work with certain chemicals for a certain length of time per day.

== See also ==
- Absorption (chemistry)
- Absorption (pharmacokinetics)
- Dermal patch
- Epidermis (skin)
- Exposure assessment
- Exposure to toxins
- Topical medication
