= Impingement filter =

An impingement filter can be used to purify a polluted solution, be it gas or liquid.

The impingement filter acts by inducing the solution to change direction and the particles to adhere to the filter medium. In many cases this filter medium is designed to contain apertures of specific size which will absorb the impurities in the solution. The gas or liquid, less impurities, is permitted free passage through the medium.

Common examples of impingement filters are air filters, fuel filters and oil filters used in cars, trucks etc.

== Sources ==
- Measuring Smokes and Rating Efficiencies of Industrial Air Filters
- Gas cleaning and cooling
