= Biomarkers of exposure assessment =

Biomarkers in analytical chemistry and in environmental science are chemicals, metabolites, susceptibility characteristics, or changes in the body that relate to the exposure of an organism to a chemical. They have the ability to identify if an exposure has occurred, the route of exposure, the pathway of exposure, and the resulting effects of the exposure. The use of biomarkers in exposure studies is also referred to as biomonitoring. When dealing with exposure assessment, there are three types of biomarkers that can be useful, biomarkers of susceptibility, biomarkers of exposure, and biomarkers of effect. Biomarkers of exposure are the most widely used because they can provide information on the route, pathway, and sometimes, even the source of exposure.

== Biomarkers of susceptibility ==
Biomarkers of susceptibility are indicators of the natural characteristics of an organism that make it more susceptible to the effects of an exposure to a chemical. They can help define what sensitivities are more susceptible as well as critical times when exposures can be most detrimental. For example, the exhalation strength of an asthmatic will indicate how susceptible that person would be to the respiratory effects of exposure to brevetoxin, the toxic compound produced during a red tide.

== Biomarkers of exposure ==
Biomarkers of exposure are the actual chemicals, or chemical metabolites, that can be measured in the body or after excretion from the body to determine different characteristics of an organism’s exposure. For example, a person or fish’s blood can be tested to see the levels of lead and therefore determine the exposure.

== Biomarkers of effect ==
Biomarkers of effect are the quantifiable changes that an individual endures, which indicates an exposure to a compound and may indicate a resulting health effect. For example, after exposure to DDT, an organochlorine insecticide known to cause problems in the reproductive system, a woman may experience miscarriages, which can be linked to her previous exposure.

Biomarkers of exposure are the most widely used because they can provide information on the route, pathway, and sometimes, even the source of exposure. These indicators also allow researchers to work forward in time to determine an exposure, and prevent it from causing further damage. This is unlike biomarkers of effect, in which a scientist may work backwards to determine if and what kind of exposure took place, but may be too late to change anything. However, biomarkers of effect are useful for future studies on the chemical(s) of interest and the results may aid in stricter laws or guidelines regarding the chemical(s).

Biomarkers must be evaluated in terms of their ability to predict and quantify exposure and dose. There are certain properties that are desirable when linking a biomarker with an exposure. These include high specificity (one exposure to one biomarker), linear relationship across time, strong correlation with a health effect, inexpensive study, and consistency (the same exposure will produce the same concentration of the biomarker every time). Without these ideal characteristics, the use of biomarkers as a strong predictor of exposure has limitations.

Many different classes of compounds can be measured in different tissues and parts of the body. From breath to hair to saliva, almost every tissue in the body has been tested as a biomarker of exposure and almost every major environmental pollutant can be identified by biomarkers, including volatile organic chemicals (VOCs) and metals like arsenic or lead. It all depends on the chemical structures and reactivity of the compound with the makeup of its storage space. The following table identifies major environmental pollutants and their biomarker tissue or organ

Pollutant Group	Parent Compound	Metabolite
VOCs	Breath, blood	Blood, urine
Tetrachoroethylene	Breath, blood, mothers' milk	None
SVOCs (pesticides, PCBs, PAHs, dioxins/furans	Blood, fat, mothers' milk	Blood, urine
Metals	Blood, bone, hair, cord blood, placenta, feces	
Carbon monoxide	Breath, blood	Blood (carboxyhemoglobin)
Environmental Tobacco Smoke (ETS)	Breath (2,5-dimethylfuran)	Saliva, blood (cotinine)
