= Exposure assessment =

Measuring toxic or environment exposure

Exposure assessment is a branch of environmental science, toxicology, epidemiology, environmental engineering, and occupational hygiene that focuses on the processes that take place at the interface between the environment containing the contaminant of interest and the organism being considered. These are the final steps in the path to release an environmental contaminant, through transport to its effect in a biological system. The assessment includes measurements of the amount of a contaminant absorbed by an exposed target organism, in what form, at what rate, and how much of the absorbed amount is actually available to produce a biological effect. Although the same general concepts apply to other organisms, the overwhelming majority of applications of exposure assessment are concerned with human health, making it an important tool in public health.

Risk is a function of exposure to an agent and the agent's inherent hazard. An environmental risk assessment consists of steps to identify and to characterize a hazard, to determine the dose-response relationship between an agent and an adverse outcome, to estimate potential exposures and, ultimately, to characterize the risk posed by an exposure to a biological, chemical or physical agent. Exposure assessments can be conducted for human populations at various scales, such as entire populations of a city or a sensitive subpopulation or community within the city. They may also be conducted for ecosystems or habitats within an ecosystem. They may even be conducted for nonliving, i.e., "abiotic", systems, such as exposure of structures and materials to an air pollutant. Exposure assessments are key tools for risk management, such as when a hazardous waste site is found to have contaminated a community's water supply. In this case, the data and information from the exposure assessment will be part of the calculations of the difference between present exposures to a contaminant and desired exposures during cleanup, e.g., zero exposure if an alternate source of clean water, e.g., bottled water, temporarily replaces the public water supply, and expected exposures when target pollutant concentrations will have been reached following the remediation of the waste site.

== Definition ==
Exposure assessment is the process of estimating or measuring the magnitude, frequency and duration of exposure to an agent, along with the number and characteristics of the population exposed. Ideally, it describes the sources, pathways, routes, and the uncertainties in the assessment. It is a necessary part of risk analysis and hence risk assessment.

Exposure analysis is the science that describes how an individual or population comes in contact with a contaminant, including quantification of the amount of contact across space and time. 'Exposure assessment' and 'exposure analysis' are often used as synonyms in many practical contexts. Risk is a function of exposure and hazard. For example, even for an extremely toxic (high hazard) substance, the risk of an adverse outcome is unlikely if exposures are near zero. Conversely, a moderately toxic substance may present substantial risk if an individual or a population is highly exposed.

== Applications ==
Quantitative measures of exposure are used: in risk assessment, together with inputs from toxicology, to determine risk from substances released to the environment, to establish protective standards, in epidemiology, to distinguish between exposed and control groups, and to protect workers from occupational hazards.

== Receptor-based approach ==
The receptor-based approach is used in exposure science. It starts by looking at different contaminants and concentrations that reach people. An exposure analyst can use direct or indirect measurements to determine if a person has been in contact with a specific contaminant or has been exposed to a specific risk (e.g. accident). Once a contaminant has been proved to reach people, exposure analysts work backwards to determine its source. After the identification of the source, it is important to find out the most efficient way to reduce adverse health effects. If the contaminant reaches a person, it is very hard to reduce the associated adverse effects. Therefore, it is very important to reduce exposure in order to diminish the risk of adverse health effects. It is highly important to use both regulatory and non-regulatory approaches in order to decrease people's exposure to contaminants. In many cases, it is better to change people's activities in order to reduce their exposures rather than regulating a source of contaminants. The receptor-based approach can be opposed to the source-based approach. This approach begins by looking at different sources of contaminants such as industries and power plants. Then, it is important to find out if the contaminant of interest has reached a receptor (usually humans). With this approach, it is very hard to prove that a pollutant from a source has reached a target.

== Exposure ==
In this context exposure is defined as the contact between an agent and a target. Contact takes place at an exposure surface over an exposure period. Mathematically, exposure is defined as

$$E=\int_{t_1}^{t_2} C(t)\, dt$$

where E is exposure, C(t) is a concentration that varies with time between the beginning and end of exposure. It has dimensions of mass times time divided by volume. This quantity is related to the potential dose of contaminant by multiplying it by the relevant contact rate, such as breathing rate, food intake rate etc. The contact rate itself may be a function of time.

=== Routes of exposure ===
Contact between a contaminant and an organism can occur through any route. The possible routes of exposure are: inhalation, if the contaminant is present in the air; ingestion, through food, drinking or hand-to-mouth behavior; and dermal absorption, if the contaminant can be absorbed through the skin.

Exposure to a contaminant can and does occur through multiple routes, simultaneously or at different times. In many cases the main route of exposure is not obvious and needs to be investigated carefully. For example, exposure to byproducts of water chlorination can obviously occur by drinking, but also through the skin, while swimming or washing, and even through inhalation from droplets undergo aerosolization during a shower. The relative proportion of exposure from these different routes cannot be determined a priori. Therefore, the equation in the previous section is correct in a strict mathematical sense, but it is a gross oversimplification of actual exposures, which are the sum of the integrals of all activities in all microenvironments. For example, the equation would have to be calculated with the specific concentration of a compound in the air in the room during the time interval. Similarly, the concentration in the ambient air would apply to the time that the person spends outdoors, whereas the concentration in the food that the person ingests would be added. The concentration integrals via all routes would be added for the exposure duration, e.g. hourly, daily or annually as

$$E=sum(\int_{t_1}^{t_2} C(t)\, dt ... \int_{t_y}^{t_z} C(t)\, dt)$$

where y is the initial time and z the ending time of last in the series of time periods spent in each microenvironment over the exposure duration.

== Measurement of exposure ==
To quantify the exposure of particular individuals or populations two approaches are used, primarily based on practical considerations:

=== Direct approach ===
A video about measuring contaminants in the air at a workplace as part of a NIOSH Health Hazard Evaluation Program exposure assessment

A video about measuring contaminants on workers' skin and workplace surfaces as part of a NIOSH Health Hazard Evaluation Program exposure assessment

The direct approach measures the exposures to pollutants by monitoring the pollutant concentrations reaching the respondents. The pollutant concentrations are directly monitored on or within the person through point of contact, biological monitoring, or biomarkers. In a workplace setting, methods of workplace exposure monitoring are used.

The point of contact approach indicates the total concentration reaching the host, while biological monitoring and the use of biomarkers infer the dosage of the pollutant through the determination of the body burden. The respondents often record their daily activities and locations during the measurement of the pollutants to identify the potential sources, microenvironments, or human activities contributing the pollutant exposure. An advantage of the direct approach is that the exposures through multiple media (air, soil, water, food, etc.) are accounted for through one study technique. The disadvantages include the invasive nature of the data collection and associated costs. Point of contact is continuous measure of the contaminant reaching the target through all routes.

Biological monitoring is another approach to measuring exposure which measures the amount of a pollutant within body tissues or fluids (such as blood or urine). Biological monitoring measures the body burden of a pollutant but not the source from whence it came. The substance measured may be either the contaminant itself or a biomarker which is specific to and indicative of an exposure to the contaminant. Biomarkers of exposure assessment is a measure of the contaminant or other proportionally related variable in the body.

Air sampling measures the contaminant in the air as concentration units of ppmv (parts per million by volume), mg/m^{3} (milligrams per cubic meter) or other mass per unit volume of air. Samplers can be worn by workers or researchers to estimate concentrations found in the breathing zone (personal) or samples collected in general areas can be used to estimate human exposure by integrating time and activity patterns. Validated and semi-validated air sampling methods are published by NIOSH, OSHA, ISO and other bodies.

Surface or dermal sampling measures the contaminant on touchable surfaces or on skin. Concentrations are typically reported in mass per unit surface area such as mg/100 cm^{2}.

In general, direct methods tend to be more accurate but more costly in terms of resources and demands placed on the subject being measured and may not always be feasible, especially for a population exposure study. Examples of direct methods include air sampling though a personal portable pump, split food samples, hand rinses, breath samples or blood samples.

=== Indirect approach ===
The indirect approach measures the pollutant concentrations in various locations or during specific human activities to predict the exposure distributions within a population. The indirect approach focuses on the pollutant concentrations within microenvironments or activities rather than the concentrations directly reaching the respondents. The measured concentrations are correlated to large-scale activity pattern data, such as the National Human Activity Pattern Survey (NHAPS), to determine the predicted exposure by multiplying the pollutant concentrations by the time spent in each microenvironment or activity, or by multiplying the pollutant concentrations by the contact rate with each media. The advantage is that process is minimally invasive to the population and is associated with lower costs than the direct approach. A disadvantage of the indirect approach is that the results were determined independently of any actual exposures, so the exposure distribution is open to errors from any inaccuracies in the assumptions made during the study, the time-activity data, or the measured pollutant concentrations. Examples of indirect methods include environmental water, air, dust, soil or consumer product sampling coupled with information such as activity/location diaries.

Mathematical exposure models may also be used to explore hypothetical situations of exposure.

=== Exposure factors ===
Especially when determining the exposure of a population rather than individuals, indirect methods can often make use of relevant statistics about the activities that can lead to an exposure. These statistics are called exposure factors. They are generally drawn from the scientific literature or governmental statistics. For example, they may report informations such as amount of different food eaten by specific populations, divided by location or age, breathing rates, time spent for different modes of commuting, showering or vacuuming, as well as information on types of residences. Such information can be combined with contaminant concentrations from ad-hoc studies or monitoring network to produce estimates of the exposure in the population of interest. These are especially useful in establishing protective standards.

Exposure factor values can be used to obtain a range of exposure estimates such as average, high-end and bounding estimates. For example, to calculate the lifetime average daily dose one would use the equation below:

$$LADD = (Contaminant Concentration)(Intake Rate)(Exposure Duration)/(Body Weight)(Average Lifetime)$$

All of the variables in the above equation, with the exception of contaminant concentration, are considered exposure factors. Each of the exposure factors involves humans, either in terms of their characteristics (e.g., body weight) or behaviors (e.g., amount of time spent in a specific location, which affects exposure duration). These characteristics and behaviors can carry a great deal of variability and uncertainty. In the case of lifetime average daily dose, variability pertains to the distribution and range of LADDs amongst individuals in the population. The uncertainty, on the other hand, refers to exposure analyst's lack of knowledge of the standard deviation, mean, and general shape when dealing with calculating LADD.

The U.S. Environmental Protection Agency's Exposure Factors Handbook provides solutions when confronting variability and reducing uncertainty. The general points are summarized below:

Four Strategies for Confronting Variability	Examples
Disaggregate the variability	Develop distribution of body weight for subgroup
Ignore the variability	Assume all adults weigh 65 kg
Use a maximum or minimum value	Choose a high-end value for weight distribution
Use the average value	Use the mean body weight for all adults

Analyzing Uncertainty	Description
Classical statistical methods (descriptive statistics and inferential statistics)	Estimating the population exposure distribution directly, based on measured values from a representative sample
Sensitivity analysis	Changing one input variable at a time while leaving others constant, to examine effect on output
Propagation of uncertainty	Examining how uncertainty in individual parameters affects the overall uncertainty of the exposure assessment
Probabilistic analysis	Varying each of the input variables over various values of their respective probability distributions (i.e. Monte Carlo integration)

== Defining acceptable exposure for occupational environments ==
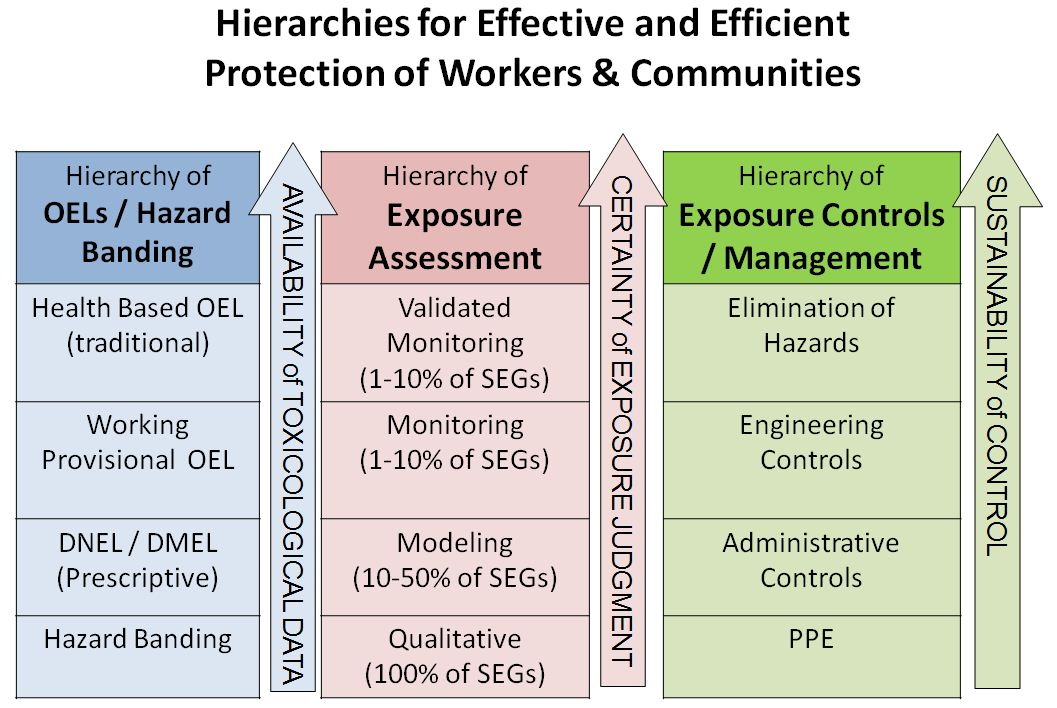
Simple representation of exposure risk assessment and management hierarchy based on available information

Occupational exposure limits are based on available toxicology and epidemiology data to protect nearly all workers over a working lifetime. Exposure assessments in occupational settings are most often performed by occupational/industrial hygiene (OH/IH) professionals who gather "basic characterization" consisting of all relevant information and data related to workers, agents of concern, materials, equipment and available exposure controls. The exposure assessment is initiated by selecting the appropriate exposure limit averaging time and "decision statistic" for the agent. Typically the statistic for deciding acceptable exposure is chosen to be the majority (90%, 95% or 99%) of all exposures to be below the selected occupational exposure limit. For retrospective exposure assessments performed in occupational environments, the "decision statistic" is typically a central tendency such as the arithmetic mean or geometric mean or median for each worker or group of workers. Methods for performing occupational exposure assessments can be found in the book A Strategy for Assessing and Managing Occupational Exposures, published by AIHA.

Exposure assessment is a continuous process that is updated as new information and data becomes available.

== Systemic errors ==
In the estimation of human exposures to environmental chemicals, the following systemic errors have been known to occur:

- an ever increasing number of chemicals registered for use and difficulty of regulatory agencies to keep track. Many producers use the term 'confidential business information' to withhold information, so exposure data are per se unavailable even though under TSCA, the US EPA may as of 2016, review and determine if a company´s claim is valid.
- assessments are difficult to be kept up-to-date;
- underestimates of exposure occur because of inadequate assumptions about human behaviors and co-exposures;
- evolving or insufficient models of toxicokinetics

== See also ==
- Workplace exposure monitoring
- Recommended Exposure Limit – Limit for exposure to a chemical substance
- Exposure science
- Environmental health – Public health branch focused on environmental impacts on human health
- Occupational exposure banding
- Permissible exposure limit – Workplace environmental standard
- Predictive intake modelling
- Threshold limit value – Upper limit on the acceptable exposure concentration of a hazardous substance in the workplace
- Radiation exposure – Measure of ionization of air by ionizing radiation
