= Workplace impact of artificial intelligence =

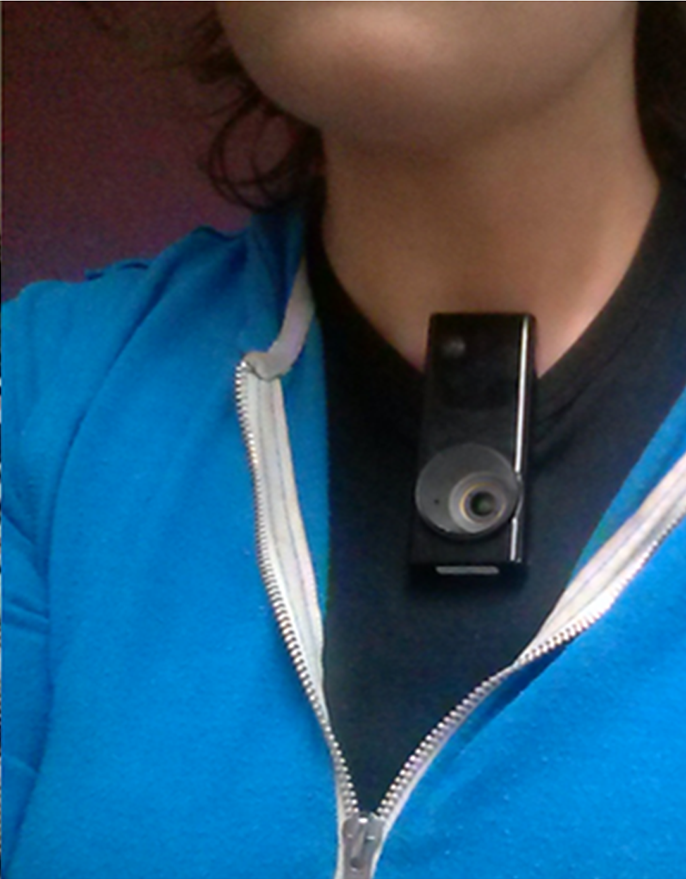
AI-enabled wearable sensor networks may improve worker safety and health through access to real-time, personalized data, but also presents psychosocial hazards such as micromanagement, a perception of surveillance, and information security concerns.

The impact of artificial intelligence on workers includes both applications to improve worker safety and health, and potential hazards that must be controlled. Another use is to track productivity.

One potential application is using AI to eliminate hazards by removing humans from hazardous situations that involve risk of stress, overwork, or musculoskeletal injuries. Predictive analytics may also be used to identify conditions that may lead to hazards such as fatigue, repetitive strain injuries, or toxic substance exposure, leading to earlier interventions. Another is to streamline workplace safety and health workflows through automating repetitive tasks, enhancing safety training programs through virtual reality, or detecting and reporting near misses.

When used in the workplace, AI also presents the possibility of new hazards. These may arise from machine learning techniques leading to unpredictable behavior and inscrutability in their decision-making, or from cybersecurity and information privacy issues. Many hazards of AI are psychosocial due to its potential to cause changes in work organization. These include increased monitoring leading to micromanagement, algorithms unintentionally or intentionally mimicking undesirable human biases, and assigning blame for machine errors to the human operator instead. AI may also lead to physical hazards in the form of human–robot collisions, and ergonomic risks of control interfaces and human–machine interactions. Hazard controls include cybersecurity and information privacy measures, communication and transparency with workers about data usage, and limitations on collaborative robots.

== Adoption by companies ==
Many technology companies have taken measures to incentivize or require the use of generative AI tools by their employees. In October 2026, Epic Games CEO Tim Sweeney announced that the company would be "moving developers around to retool for maximum AI acceleration." Bloomberg reported that staff on a Disney collaboration were asked to finish the game using entirely AI tools, including directives such as "no more hand-written code" and art assets being "generated with full AI workflows."

=== Token maxxing ===
Token maxxing or tokenmaxxing (also token maxing), a term that uses the incelosphere-related suffix "-maxx" is a metric used in an attempt to track productivity in the workplace especially for those using artificial intelligence (AI) based services. AI services charge for each token which represent units of effort expended by an AI service to solve a problem. Some believe that token consumption equates to productivity and thus can be used as a metric to monitor an employee's work.

Supporters believe that higher token usage indicates higher productivity and higher use of powerful AI services. Critics claim that prudent workers will maximize any metric that management wants increased to gain a workplace advantage, such as by running several AI agents in tandem, entering longer input prompts, or excessively automating tasks to maximize token consumption. To management, this higher token usage may indicate potential productivity, but in reality may cause additional token costs, worker burnout, or actually create more bloated code of lower quality. Another claim is AI service companies potentially benefit from such an emphasis on token consumption and actively encourage the trend.

Some developers have publicly advocated the practice. Developer Sigrid Jin, who said he used 50 billion tokens in a single year, has argued that maximizing token consumption is the best way to understand the value of AI, advising others to spend as much on AI usage as they pay in rent to obtain a return on investment.

== Health and safety applications ==
For any potential AI health and safety application to be adopted, it requires acceptance by both managers and workers. For example, worker acceptance may be diminished by concerns about information privacy, or from a lack of trust and acceptance of the new technology, which may arise from inadequate transparency or training. Alternatively, managers may emphasize increases in economic productivity rather than gains in worker safety and health when implementing AI-based systems.

=== Eliminating hazardous tasks ===
AI may increase the scope of work tasks where a worker can be removed from a situation that carries risk. In a sense, while traditional automation can replace the functions of a worker's body with a robot, AI effectively replaces the functions of their brain with a computer. Hazards that can be avoided include stress, overwork, musculoskeletal injuries, and boredom.

This can expand the range of affected job sectors into white-collar and service sector jobs such as in medicine, finance, and information technology.

=== Analytics to reduce risk ===
Machine learning is used for people analytics to make predictions about worker behavior to assist management decision-making, such as hiring and performance assessment. These could also be used to improve worker health. The analytics may be based on inputs such as online activities, monitoring of communications, location tracking, and voice analysis and body language analysis of filmed interviews. For example, sentiment analysis may be used to spot fatigue to prevent overwork. Decision support systems have a similar ability to be used to, for example, prevent industrial disasters or make disaster response more efficient.

For manual material handling workers, predictive analytics and artificial intelligence may be used to reduce musculoskeletal injury. Traditional guidelines are based on statistical averages and are geared towards anthropometrically typical humans. The analysis of large amounts of data from wearable sensors may allow real-time, personalized calculation of ergonomic risk and fatigue management, as well as better analysis of the risk associated with specific job roles.

Wearable sensors may also enable earlier intervention against exposure to toxic substances than is possible with area or breathing zone testing on a periodic basis. Furthermore, the large data sets generated could improve workplace health surveillance, risk assessment, and research.

=== Streamlining safety and health workflows ===
AI has also been used to attempt to make the workplace safety and health workflow more efficient. One example is coding of workers' compensation claims, which are submitted in a prose narrative form and must manually be assigned standardized codes. AI is being investigated to perform this task faster, more cheaply, and with fewer errors.

== Hazards ==
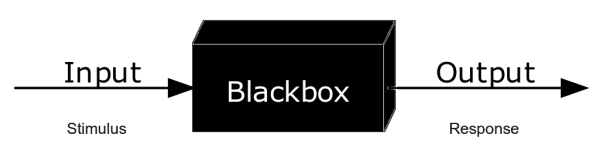
Some machine learning training methods are prone to unpredictability and inscrutability in their decision-making, which can lead to hazards if managers or workers cannot predict or understand an AI-based system's behavior.

There are several broad aspects of AI that may give rise to specific hazards. The risks depend on implementation rather than the mere presence of AI.

Systems using sub-symbolic AI such as machine learning may behave unpredictably and are more prone to inscrutability in their decision-making. This is especially true if a situation is encountered that was not part of the AI's training dataset, and is exacerbated in environments that are less structured. Undesired behavior may also arise from flaws in the system's perception (arising either from within the software or from sensor degradation), knowledge representation and reasoning, or from software bugs. They may arise from improper training, such as a user applying the same algorithm to two problems that do not have the same requirements. Machine learning applied during the design phase may have different implications than that applied at runtime. Systems using symbolic AI are less prone to unpredictable behavior.

The use of AI also increases cybersecurity risks relative to platforms that do not use AI, and information privacy concerns about collected data may pose a hazard to workers.

=== Psychosocial ===
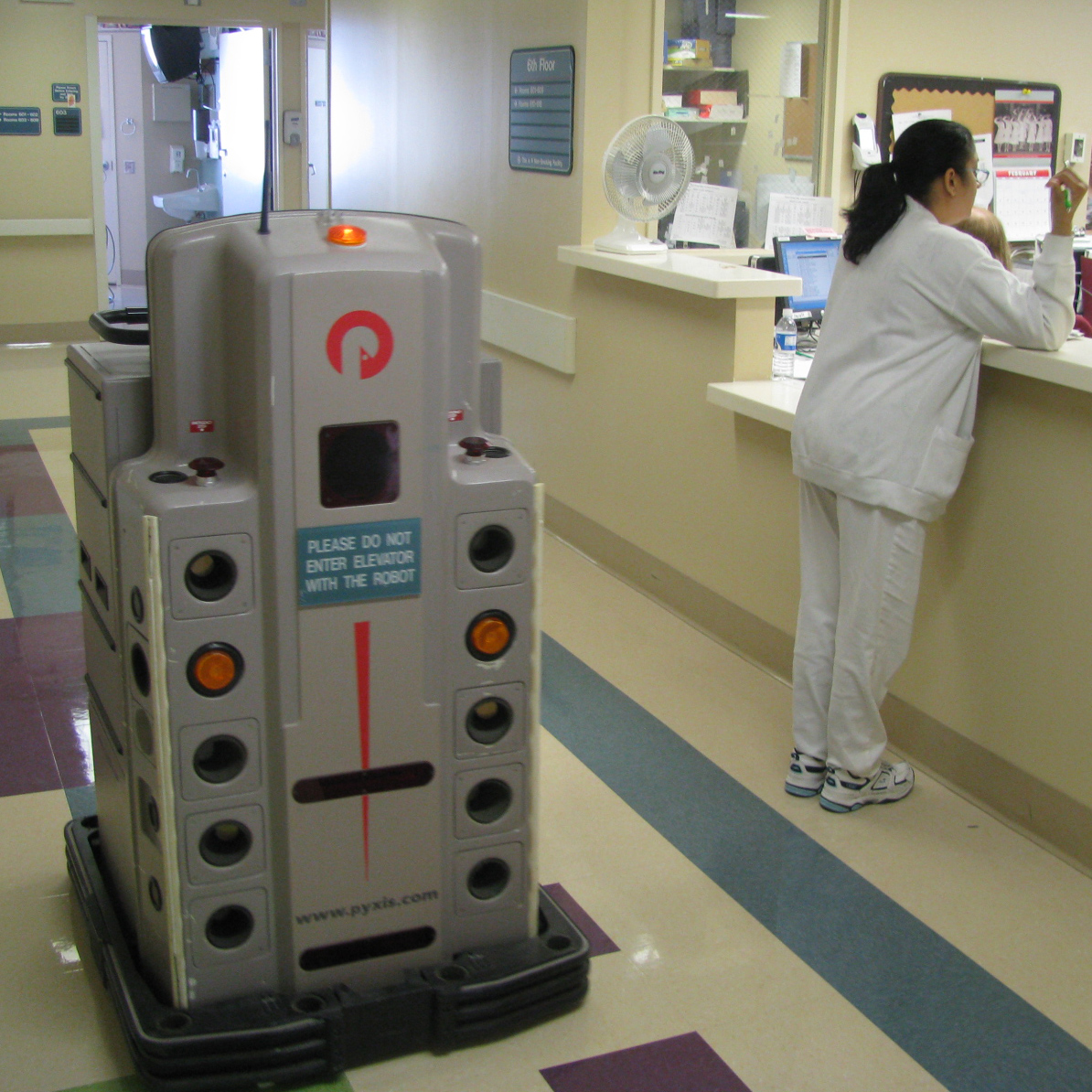
Introduction of new AI-enabled technologies may lead to changes in work practices that carry psychosocial hazards such as a need for retraining or fear of technological unemployment.

Psychosocial hazards are those that arise from the way work is designed, organized, and managed, or its economic and social contexts, rather than arising from a physical substance or object. They cause not only psychiatric and psychological outcomes such as occupational burnout, anxiety disorders, and depression, but they can also cause physical injury or illness such as cardiovascular disease or musculoskeletal injury. Many hazards of AI are psychosocial in nature due to its potential to cause changes in work organization, in terms of increasing complexity and interaction between different organizational factors. However, psychosocial risks are often overlooked by designers of advanced manufacturing systems.

Einola and Khoreva explore how different organizational groups perceive and interact with AI technologies. Their research shows that successful AI integration depends on human ownership and contextual understanding. They caution against blind technological optimism and stress the importance of tailoring AI use to specific workplace ecosystems. This perspective reinforces the need for inclusive design and transparent implementation strategies.

==== Changes in work practices ====
Use of AI tools in the workplace may also be more accurately defined as "augmented intelligence" to highlight the augmentation of human intelligence with an AI tool, making specific combinations of human-and-AI action definitively important as contextual choices are made whether human or AI capacities should be put first in different circumstances. In some circumstances, over-reliance on AI tools may lead to deskilling of some professions.

When AI becomes a substitute for traditional peer collaboration and mentorship, there is a risk of diminishing opportunities for interpersonal skill development and team-based learning.

Increased monitoring may lead to micromanagement and thus to stress and anxiety. A perception of surveillance may also lead to stress. Controls for these include consultation with worker groups, extensive testing, and attention to introduced bias. Wearable sensors, activity trackers, and augmented reality may also lead to stress from micromanagement, both for assembly line workers and gig workers. Gig workers also lack the legal protections and rights of formal workers.

Newell & Marabelli argue that AI alters power dynamics and employee autonomy, requiring a more nuanced understanding of its social and organizational implications.

There is also the risk of people being forced to work at a robot's pace, or to monitor robot performance at nonstandard hours.

A 2025 preprint paper based on users' interactions with the AI chatbot Microsoft Copilot identified forty jobs that the authors claimed had high overlaps with the capabilities of AI. Some media outlets used this paper to report on jobs becoming obsolete. Criticism of the paper suggesting that it had misrepresented typical workplace activities to augment AI's current performance. The historian Chris Campbell argued that the "report's methods, deliberately or otherwise, de-skill historians away from a job that requires high-level and deeply human analytical skills to one that is tasked solely with the retention and provision of knowledge. Under that flawed rubric, it is little wonder that historians have a high AI applicability score."

==== Bias ====
Algorithms trained on past decisions may mimic undesirable human biases, for example, past discriminatory hiring and firing practices. Information asymmetry between management and workers may lead to stress, if workers do not have access to the data or algorithms that are the basis for decision-making.

In addition to building a model with inadvertently discriminatory features, intentional discrimination may occur through designing metrics that covertly result in discrimination through correlated variables in a non-obvious way.

In complex human‐machine interactions, some approaches to accident analysis may be biased to safeguard a technological system and its developers by assigning blame to the individual human operator instead.

=== Physical ===
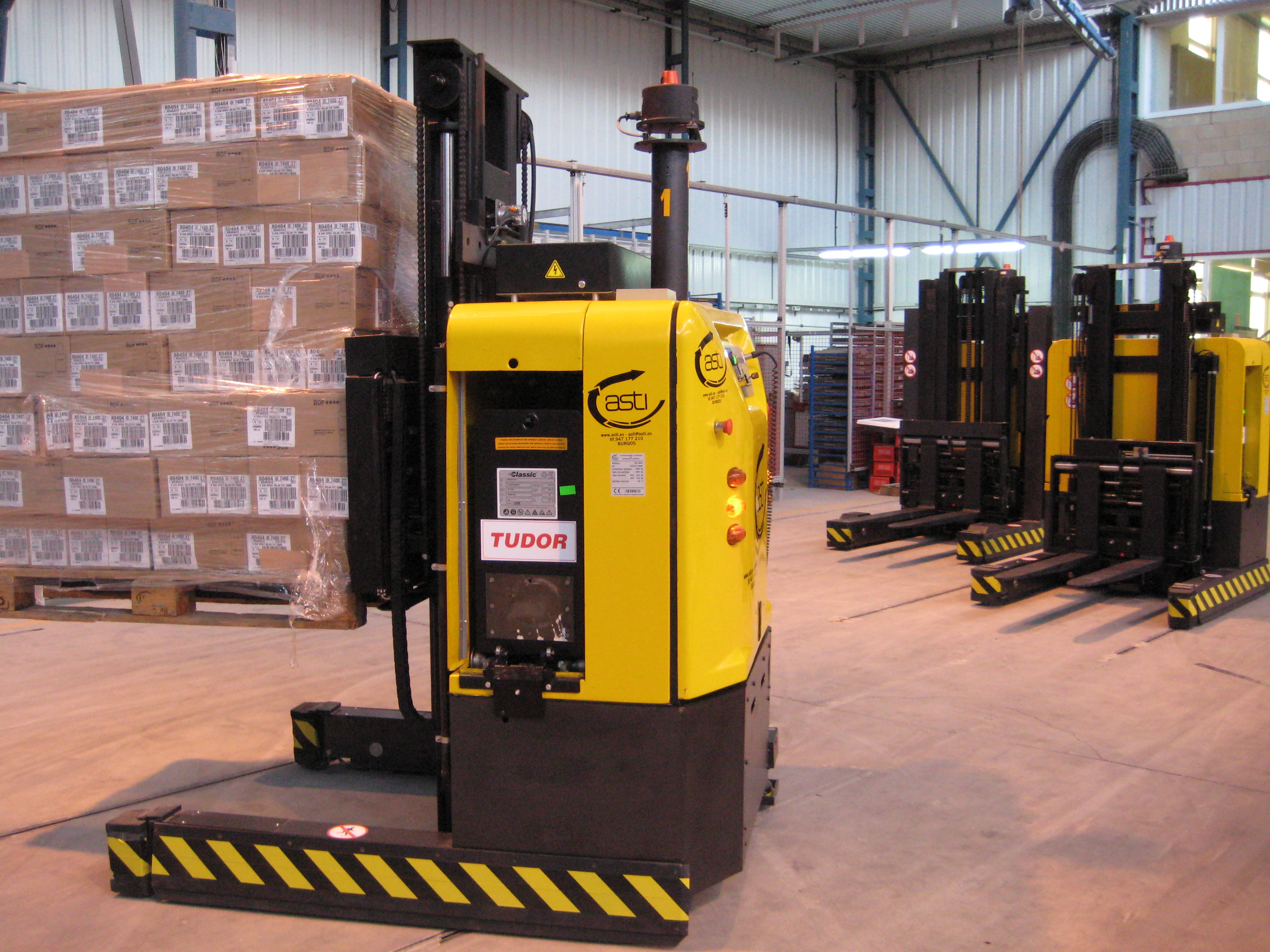
Automated guided vehicles are examples of cobots currently in common use. Use of AI to operate these robots may affect the risk of physical hazards such as the robot or its moving parts colliding with workers.

Physical hazards in the form of human–robot collisions may arise from robots using AI, especially collaborative robots (cobots). Cobots are intended to operate in close proximity to humans, which makes impossible the common hazard control of isolating the robot using fences or other barriers, which is widely used for traditional industrial robots. Automated guided vehicles are a type of cobot that as of 2019 are in common use, often as forklifts or pallet jacks in warehouses or factories. For cobots, sensor malfunctions or unexpected work environment conditions can lead to unpredictable robot behavior and thus to human–robot collisions.

Self-driving cars are another example of AI-enabled robots. In addition, the ergonomics of control interfaces and human–machine interactions may give rise to hazards.

== Hazard controls ==
AI, in common with other computational technologies, requires cybersecurity measures to stop software breaches and intrusions, as well as information privacy measures. Communication and transparency with workers about data usage is a control for psychosocial hazards arising from security and privacy issues. Proposed best practices for employer‐sponsored worker monitoring programs include using only validated sensor technologies; ensuring voluntary worker participation; ceasing data collection outside the workplace; disclosing all data uses; and ensuring secure data storage.

For industrial cobots equipped with AI‐enabled sensors, the International Organization for Standardization (ISO) recommended: (a) safety‐related monitored stopping controls; (b) human hand guiding of the cobot; (c) speed and separation monitoring controls; and (d) power and force limitations. Networked AI-enabled cobots may share safety improvements with each other. Human oversight is another general hazard control for AI.

== Risk management ==
Both applications and hazards arising from AI can be considered as part of existing frameworks for occupational health and safety risk management. As with all hazards, risk identification is most effective and least costly when done in the design phase.

Workplace health surveillance, the collection and analysis of health data on workers, is challenging for AI because labor data are often reported in aggregate and does not provide breakdowns between different types of work, and is focused on economic data such as wages and employment rates rather than skill content of jobs. Proxies for skill content include educational requirements and classifications of routine versus non-routine, and cognitive versus physical jobs. However, these may still not be specific enough to distinguish specific occupations that have distinct impacts from AI. The United States Department of Labor's Occupational Information Network is an example of a database with a detailed taxonomy of skills. Additionally, data are often reported on a national level, while there is much geographical variation, especially between urban and rural areas.

AI systems in the workplace raise ethical concerns related to privacy, fairness, human dignity, and transparency. According to the OECD, these risks must be addressed through robust governance frameworks and accountability mechanisms. Ethical deployment of AI requires clear policies on data usage, explainability of algorithms, and safeguards against discrimination and surveillance.

== Employment ==
Certain digital technologies are predicted to result in job losses. Starting in the 2020s, the adoption of modern robotics has led to net employment growth. However, many businesses anticipate that automation, or employing robots would result in job losses in the future. This is especially true for companies in Central and Eastern Europe. Other digital technologies, such as platforms or big data, are projected to have a more neutral impact on employment. A large number of tech workers have been laid off starting in 2023; many such job cuts have been attributed to artificial intelligence. Some companies have also reduced staff to fund investment in AI. In March 2026, Oracle began laying off employees, notifying many of them by early-morning email, as it redirected spending toward AI infrastructure. The company later reported about 141,000 full-time employees as of 31 May 2026, down from 162,000 a year earlier. An August 2026 report by the Stanford Digital Economy Lab stated that there was no evidence of widespread, economy-wide job displacement due to AI, but found that workers aged 22 to 25 in AI-exposed occupations had an employment level 19% lower than those in fields less exposed to AI.

== Standards and regulation ==
As of 2019, ISO was developing a standard on the use of metrics and dashboards, information displays presenting company metrics for managers, in workplaces. The standard is planned to include guidelines for both gathering data and displaying it in a viewable and useful manner.

In the European Union, the General Data Protection Regulation, while oriented towards consumer data, is also relevant for workplace data collection. Data subjects, including workers, have "the right not to be subject to a decision based solely on automated processing". Other relevant EU directives include the Machinery Directive (2006/42/EC), the Radio Equipment Directive (2014/53/EU), and the General Product Safety Directive (2001/95/EC).

== See also ==
- Environmental impact of artificial intelligence
- Employee monitoring
- Computer surveillance in the workplace
- Goodhart's law
- Perverse incentive
- Jevons Paradox
