= 2009 Leeds refuse workers' strike =

Labour strike in the City of Leeds

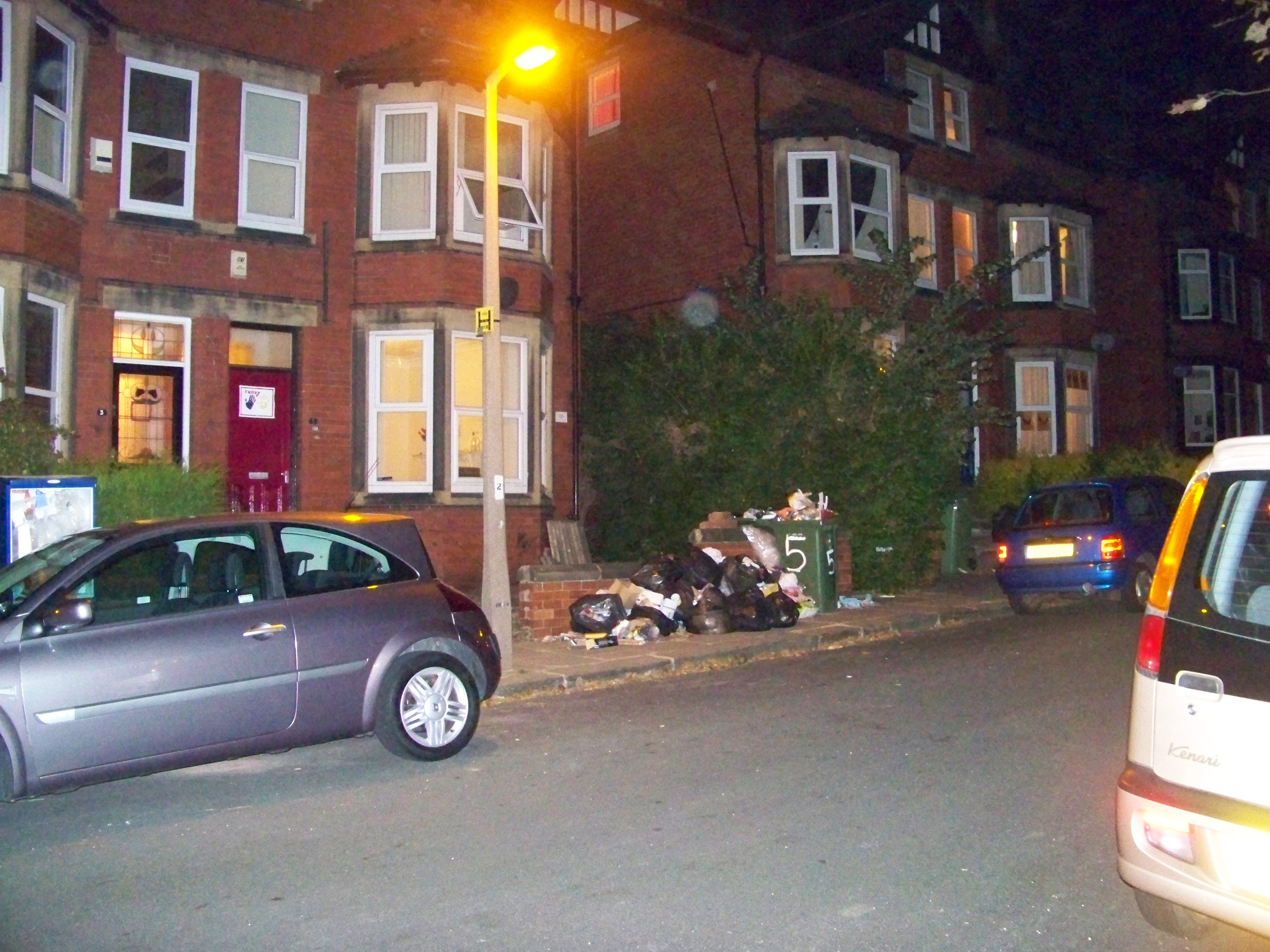
- Consequences of the strike in Headingley
- Date: 7 September – 25 November 2009
- Location: City of Leeds, West Yorkshire, England
- Caused by: Pay cuts in a revised pay scheme proposed by Leeds City Council
- Goals: Renegotiation of the proposed pay scheme
- Result: Settlement reached

Parties
Refuse workers of Leeds	Leeds City Council

Number
600 unionised workers: 500+ on strike	

On 7 September 2009, refuse workers in the City of Leeds, West Yorkshire, England, began an eleven-week strike in protest of pay cuts in a revised pay scheme proposed by Leeds City Council. The council reached a settlement with the unions representing the city's refuse workers, with pay cuts being retained but reduced.

== Cause ==
The strike was prompted by a collapse in negotiations between Leeds City Council and unions representing the city's refuse workers. Council had proposed a revised pay scheme which would increase working hours to address productivity deficiencies, while reducing salaries for male refuse workers to close the gender pay gap. The proposed plan would have cut on average about £1,000 from a binman's average annual salary of £18,000. Council drivers faced an annual loss of £3,535, while street sweepers were set to lose £2,634. The unions initially claimed a maximum of annual loss of £6,000 for certain workers, which was revised to £4,491 in later calculations.

== Start of the strike ==
The refuse workers' unions began their strike on 7 September 2009. Tony Pearson, a regional union organiser, stated that more than 500 workers were taking part in the strike. Leeds City Council announced on its website that street services were operating at 15% of normal levels and dozens of staff had reported for work as usual. Pearson described the picket line as being in a "very, very good" mood and the proposed pay scheme as "an attack on working class people and their families". Council leader Richard Brett of the Liberal Democrats described the beginning of the strike as "deeply regrettable", accused the unions of making unrealistic demands, and said the council would not negotiate with the unions unless the strike ended.

== Negotiations and responses ==
On 21 October, 92% of refuse workers voted against a new pay scheme proposal, which council touted as its "best and final" offer. The new proposal retained the pay cuts at a lower rate, but increased work hours across the board. The proposed cuts included £231 for refuse collectors, £994 for council drivers, and £543 for street sweepers, phased in over two years. Desiree Risebury, Yorkshire regional organiser for the GMB union, described the productivity demands as "just physically impossible", as crews would have to clear 220 properties an hour, or about four sets of wheeliebins per minute.

Brett criticised the unions' rejection of the October proposal, saying: "I simply do not understand why workers have rejected what was an excellent offer. With hard work we had found a way of addressing the pay gap for the majority of staff, which was the primary reason given for the strike in the first place. It's clear to me now that the dispute is no longer principally to do with money – it's about productivity and efficiency." Conservative group leader Andrew Carter meanwhile responded: "It is wrong that Leeds has a refuse collection service that is 20% less efficient than many other councils – an inefficiency that equates to approximately £2 million. That is why we were very happy to put a proposal on the table that dealt with the pay gap issue, as long as the workforce delivered the required productivity in return."

On 27 October, with the strike having lasted for eight weeks, the council began advertising for new refuse workers. The council said it was advertising for staff in order to meet its target of a fortnightly black bin collection.

== Resolution and aftermath ==
In a secret ballot on 23 November, 79% of 600 unionised refuse workers voted to accept a new proposal from council, which would see 20 staff getting a pay cut, but most workers receiving small increases. Some workers expressed their dissatisfaction with the outcome, saying they participated in the strike to stop all pay cuts. Refuse workers returned to work on 25 November.

Councillor James Monaghan, the executive board member responsible for refuse collection, estimated a £180,000 loss due to the strike. He claimed that conceding to the unions' demands would have cost £45 million annually, while the negotiated settlement would save the city £2 million annually instead.

== See also ==
- 2025–2026 Birmingham bin strike
