= LOTO =

LOTO may refer to:

- Leader of the Opposition, a title traditionally held by the leader of the largest party not in government in a Westminster System of parliamentary government
- Lockout-tagout, a safety procedure used in industry and research settings
