= 2025–2026 Birmingham bin strike =

Industrial action by refuse workers in Birmingham, England

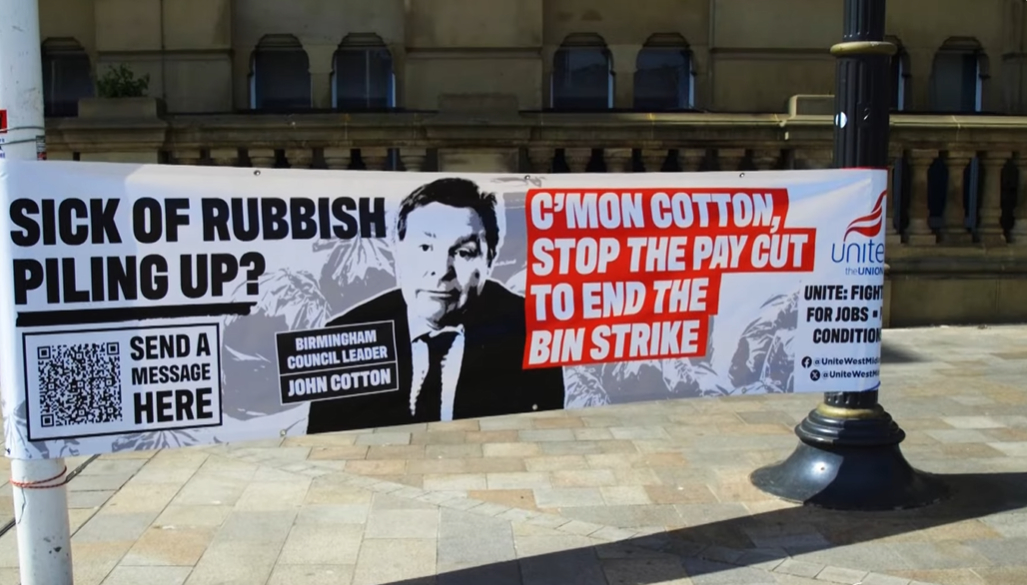
- Union poster criticising Birmingham City Council leader John Cotton at a picket outside Birmingham City Council House in May 2025
- Date: 11 March 2025 (Note: Preceded by a series of one-day strikes starting on 6 January 2025.) – present (1 year, 3 months and 14 days)
- Location: Birmingham, West Midlands, England
- Caused by: Proposed pay cuts and job cuts by Birmingham City Council
- Goals: Renegotiation of cuts
- Result: Ongoing, not yet decided

Parties
Birmingham refuse workers (represented by Unite the Union) Supported by: ASLEF; Fire Brigades Union; National Education Union; PCS; RMT	Birmingham City Council Supported by: British government (Labour Party)

Lead figures
Sharon Graham, Unite Mick Whelan, ASLEF; Dave Calfe, ASLEF; Paul W. Fleming, Equity; Steve Wright, FBU; Matt Wrack, NASUWT; Daniel Kebede, NEU; Fran Heathcote, PCS; Eddie Dempsey, RMT Politicians supportive: John McDonnell, Labour; Jeremy Corbyn, Your Party; Zarah Sultana, Your Party; Zack Polanski, Greens (E&W)	John Cotton Cllr, Council leader Majid Mahmood Cllr, Council Environment minister Supported by: Keir Starmer, Prime minister Angela Rayner, Deputy prime minister (Note: Rayner resigned as Deputy Prime Minister on 5 September 2025.)

The 2025–2026 Birmingham bin strike is an ongoing standoff between striking refuse workers and Birmingham City Council in Birmingham, England. The workers, represented by Unite the Union, began their strike on 11 March 2025 after a dispute with the council over its proposed pay cuts and elimination of Waste Recycling and Collection Officer (WRCO) roles.

According to the union, approximately 150 to 170 of its members are facing pay cuts of up to £8,000 annually, with hundreds more losing out on pay progression. The union also argues that the WRCO is important to health and safety. According to the council, only 17 workers would be affected; the impact on pay would be far less; and all those affected by the elimination of the WRCO role have been offered other roles for equivalent pay, training as large goods vehicle (LGV) drivers, or voluntary redundancy payouts. The council also says that the WRCO role does not exist at other councils, and that retaining the role opens it up to equal pay claims, since it is performed mainly by men.

In March 2025, the council declared a major incident after 17,000 tonnes of rubbish were left uncollected on the streets. The council has called on other local authorities to assist with clearing the backlog of rubbish. In April, the government called in army specialists, including office-based military planners, to provide logistical support for the council, rather than deploying soldiers. In July, Unite announced it would review its relationship with the governing Labour Party after the government and the then Deputy Prime Minister Angela Rayner expressed their support for the council over the strikers. Media reporting has indicated that different areas of the city have been impacted by the strike to different extents, with lower income inner city areas such as Sparkhill, Balsall Heath, Small Heath, Sparkbrook and Ladywood suffering from the piling up of refuse to a greater degree than more affluent suburbs like Harborne and Edgbaston, replicating a pattern seen in the city's previous bin strike in 2017. Rachel Adams, a researcher at the University of Birmingham's Health Services Management Centre, suggested that factors contributing to this include differences in population density, access to transport and distance to waste disposal sites. Some residents of poorer areas also claimed that their localities were also used for flytipping by people from elsewhere, and that wealthier areas were being prioritised for refuse collection rounds. Specific factors behind the disparity—such as the tendency for residents in wealthier areas to lodge more complaints, as seen elsewhere— are not yet substantiated in this case.

== Megapickets ==
On 9 May 2025, a "megapicket" by members of other trade unions was organised at Lifford Lane Depot in solidarity with the striking workers. Speakers included Mick Whelan, then General Secretary of ASLEF, Steve Wright, General Secretary of the Fire Brigades Union, and Daniel Kebede, General Secretary of the National Education Union. The action was co-ordinated by Strike Map.

On 25 July 2025, Strike Map coordinated a second megapicket across the five sites of Atlas Depot, Lifford Lane Depot, Perry Barr Depot, Ryton site in Coventry and Veolia Incinerator. Speakers included Fran Heathcote, General Secretary of PCS, Steve Wright, General Secretary of the Fire Brigades Union, and Jeremy Corbyn, MP for Islington North.

On 30 January 2026, Strike Map are coordinated a third megapicket. Dubbed 'Megapicket 3-D' speakers included Steve Wright, Zarah Sultana, Eddie Dempsey, Mick Whelan, Caroline Hayhurst, Matt Wrack, Ed Harlow, Ian Hodson, Steven Wicks, John McDonnell, Zack Polanski, Paul W Fleming, and Tony Wilson.

In order to combat these megapickets, on 3 February 2026, Birmingham City Council issued an application for an injunction for 6 months prohibiting protesting activities by persons unknown who, in support of strikes organised by Unite the Union ("Unite") and without the council's consent. Strike Map's co-founder Henry Fowler responded to the application accusing Birmingham City Council of cowardice saying "This is an act of pure cowardice by Birmingham City Council, backed by their unelected commissioners." General Secretary of the Fire Brigades Union, Steve Wright, said "By seeking this injunction, Birmingham City Council has confirmed it is more interested in crushing this strike than resolving it." General Secretary of ASLEF, Dave Calfe, said "Let us be absolutely clear: standing with workers in struggle is not a crime". The court hearing for the injunction took place on 13 February 2026, and attracted protestors in support of the striking bin workers outside of Birmingham County Court. The injunction was granted on 20 February 2026.

== Angela Rayner's suspension from Unite ==
On 11 July 2025 at Unite the Union's policy conference, a vote was passed to suspend the then Deputy Prime Minister Angela Rayner's membership over her handling of the bin strike. However, Rayner has insisted that she was not a member of Unite at that time.

== Cost to Birmingham City Council ==
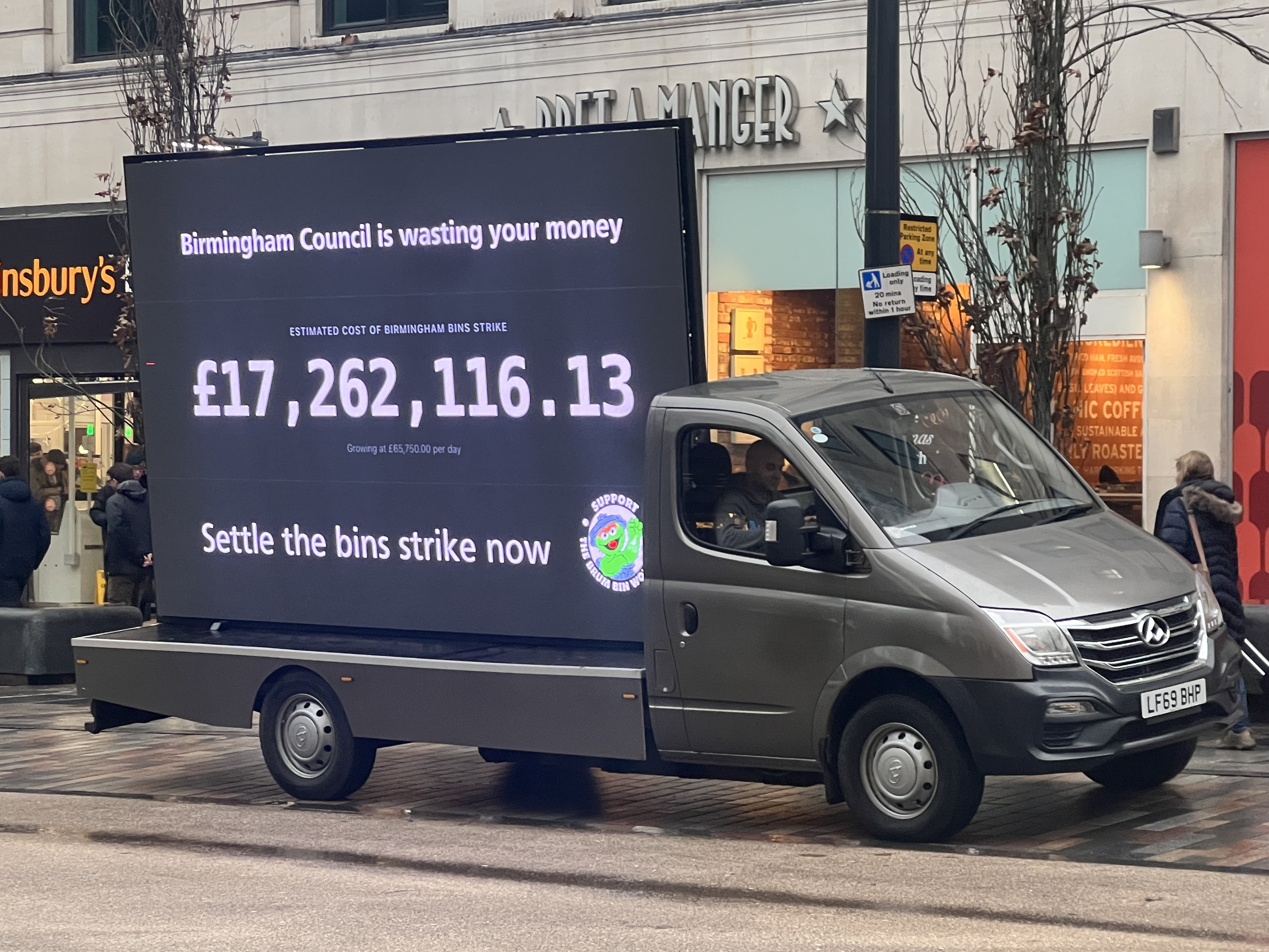
A digital billboard on Colmore Row in December 2025, displaying "Birmingham council is wasting your money"

In October 2025, a Birmingham City Council report put the cost of the industrial action at £14 million. Freedom of information requests made to Birmingham City Council asking about the report have been refused.

In January 2026, a Birmingham City Council report put the cost of the industrial action at £33.4 million.

== Inaccuracy of equal pay claim figure ==
On 15 October 2025, the Birmingham Mail reported that the figure for the council's equal pay settlement was a fraction of the figure of £760 million that was originally claimed. In response to this, Sharon Graham stated "The ongoing bin strike is a direct result of the council's mismanagement of its finances. Unite has repeatedly provided the council with expert legal advice to demonstrate it was making the wrong calculations on equal pay, but the council was too arrogant to even consider it".

== Allegations of blacklisting of agency workers and vote to strike ==
On 9 October 2025, recruitment agency Job and Talent manager Mark Asson was recorded addressing a group of agency workers saying "Now I've spoken to Chris, I've spoken to Rob Edmondson, and I think, you know categorically the council are not going to employ anybody that they don't want to employ[...]So those people that do decide to join the picket line, then the council have confirmed to us that they are not going to get a permanent job".

This led to Sharon Graham accusing Birmingham City Council of blacklisting workers who are engaged in lawful trade union activity, saying "Blacklisting workers for union activities is despicable. Those who do it are breaking the law and must be held to account". Unite called for an independent investigation into the blacklisting of workers by Birmingham City Council. In November 2025 it was announced that 18 of 22 Unite members employed as agency workers for refuse collection during the strike had voted to join the picket lines from the beginning of December, due to alleged bullying, harassment and excessive workloads.

On Tuesday 25 November Unite reported that Job and Talent employment agency had been bullying agency workers by publishing on the staff room wall monitoring information about the performance of HGV drivers including driving time, speed and distance. Birmingham City Council admitted this practice contravened the General Data Protection Regulation.

== Councillor Majid Mahmood's removal of Unite placards ==
On 25 February 2026 it was reported that Majid Mahmood, the Birmingham City Council cabinet member responsible for waste, had been filmed taking down pro-strike placards from streets in Birmingham.

== Unite reduction of funding of Labour Party ==
On 11 March 2026, the anniversary of the start of the strike, Unite the Union cut its annual donation to the Labour Party by £580,000, a decrease of 40% from its previous funding of £1.45 million. The union stated a resolution of the dispute has been formulated at the Advisory, Conciliation and Arbitration Service (Acas), but the Labour-run council had not agreed to it. A periodic Unite rules conference will take place in 2027, which may consider whether the union should remain affiliated to the Labour Party.

== See also ==
- 2009 Leeds refuse workers' strike
- United Kingdom industrial disputes and strikes (2022–present)
