= GreenCE =

GreenCE, Inc.
- Company type: Privately held company
- Industry: Online education, e-learning
- Founded: January 1, 2006, in Ridgefield, Washington
- Founders: Ron Blank
- Headquarters: 2611 N Loop 1604 W Ste 100, San Antonio, Texas, 78258, United States
- Owners: Ron Blank
- Website: greence.com

GreenCE is an online platform that educates architects, engineers, interior designers, and contractors. The organization is a US Green Building Council (USGBC) Education Partner. The USGBC developed the Leadership in Energy and Environmental Design (LEED) system, the world's most utilized green building rating system. GreenCE is also an American Institute of Architects (AIA) Education Provider. It develops and delivers continuing education via online courses, webinars, and live classroom events. GreenCE is a partner with the Health Product Declaration Collaborative and is one of seven companies in the world to help develop third party verification tools for the building product declaration. GreenCE is based in San Antonio, Texas, and has an office in Portland, Oregon, dedicated to LEED certification education.

== History ==
GreenCE was founded by Ron Blank and Brad Blank in 2006. Ron Blank also owns Ron Blank & Associates, a firm that specializes in architectural specification for building product manufacturers.

== Continuing Education ==
Online courses and webinars are the main focus of the GreenCE education platform. The platform delivers education about LEED certification, the Americans With Disabilities Act (ADA), and sustainable design case studies.

== Health Product Declaration ==
GreenCE develops Health Product Declarations (HPD) for building products. The HPD provides information about a building product's contents, environmental health hazards, and plays a significant role in building product specification. The HPD can contribute points under the LEED v4 green building rating system. GreenCE develops HPDs utilizing a multi-disciplinary team of biologists, architects, and LEED experts.
