= Waste collector =

Person employed by a public or private enterprise to collect and dispose of waste

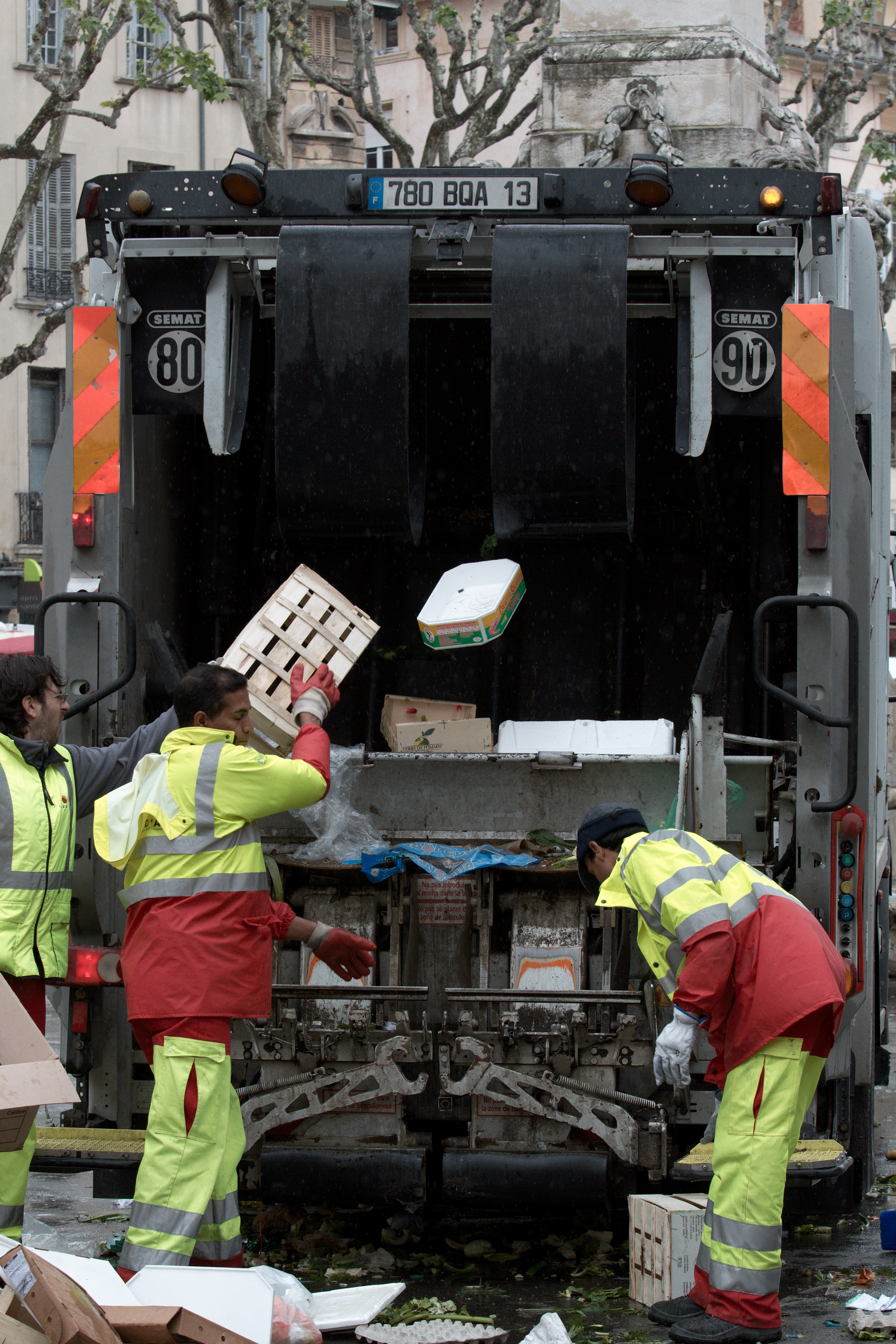
Waste collectors in Aix-en-Provence, France

A waste collector, also known as a refuse collector, recycler, garbage man, garbage collector, trashman (in the U.S), binman, dustbin man or dustman (in the UK), is a person employed by a public or private enterprise to collect and dispose of municipal solid waste (refuse) and recyclables from residential, commercial, industrial or other collection sites for further processing and waste disposal. Specialised waste collection vehicles (also known as garbage trucks in the U.S., bin lorries in the UK) featuring an array of automated functions are often deployed to assist waste collectors in reducing collection and transport time and for protection from exposure. Waste and recycling pickup work is physically demanding and usually exposes workers to an occupational hazard.

The first known waste collectors were said to come from Britain in the 1350s, coinciding with the Black Plague, and were called "rakers".

A related occupation is that of a sanitation worker who operates and maintains sanitation technology.

== Health and safety hazards ==
Statistics show that waste collection is one of the most dangerous jobs, at times more dangerous than police work but consistently less dangerous than commercial fishing and ranch and farm work. On-the-job hazards include broken glass, medical waste such as syringes, caustic chemicals, objects falling out of overloaded containers, diseases that may accompany solid waste, asbestos, dog attacks and pests, inhaling dust, smoke and chemical fumes, severe weather, traffic accidents, and unpleasant smells that can make someone physically sick.

Risks also exist from working in close proximity to traffic hazards and using heavy machinery (such as container lifters and compactors) on collection vehicles.

=== Refuse Collection Vehicle Safety ===
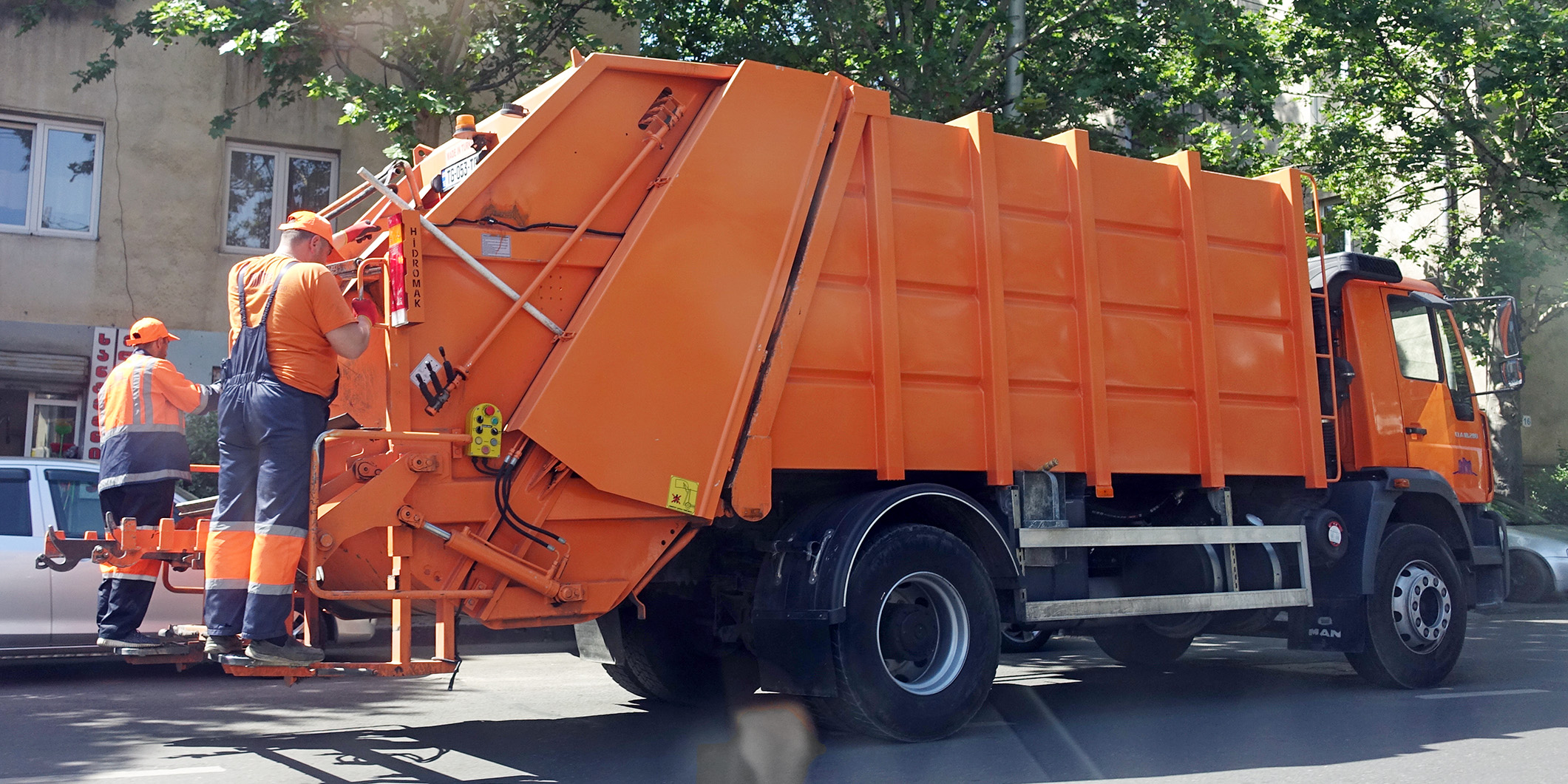
Waste collectors riding on refuse collection truck in Tbilisi, Georgia

In most countries worldwide, waste collectors operate moving vehicles to aid in gathering garbage. There are several types of waste-collecting vehicles: front-load trucks, rear-load trucks, side-load trucks, and roll-on-off trucks. Waste collecting trucks can be automatic or semi-automatic, lessening the ergonomic challenges for workers. Lifting and loading waste bins remains the main ergonomic stressor associated with the waste-collecting occupation. Collectors are at risk of developing work-related musculoskeletal disorders (WMSD). Risk for injury includes a risk of falling off the truck while it is moving, being run-over by passing motor vehicles, being run over when a waste-collecting truck is reversing, slipping and falling off the refuse vehicle, and losing or otherwise injuring limbs due to getting caught in equipment. Waste-collecting vehicles can expose workers to higher amounts of exhaust as many have exhaust pipes located on the back of the vehicle.

=== Safety Hazards of Waste ===
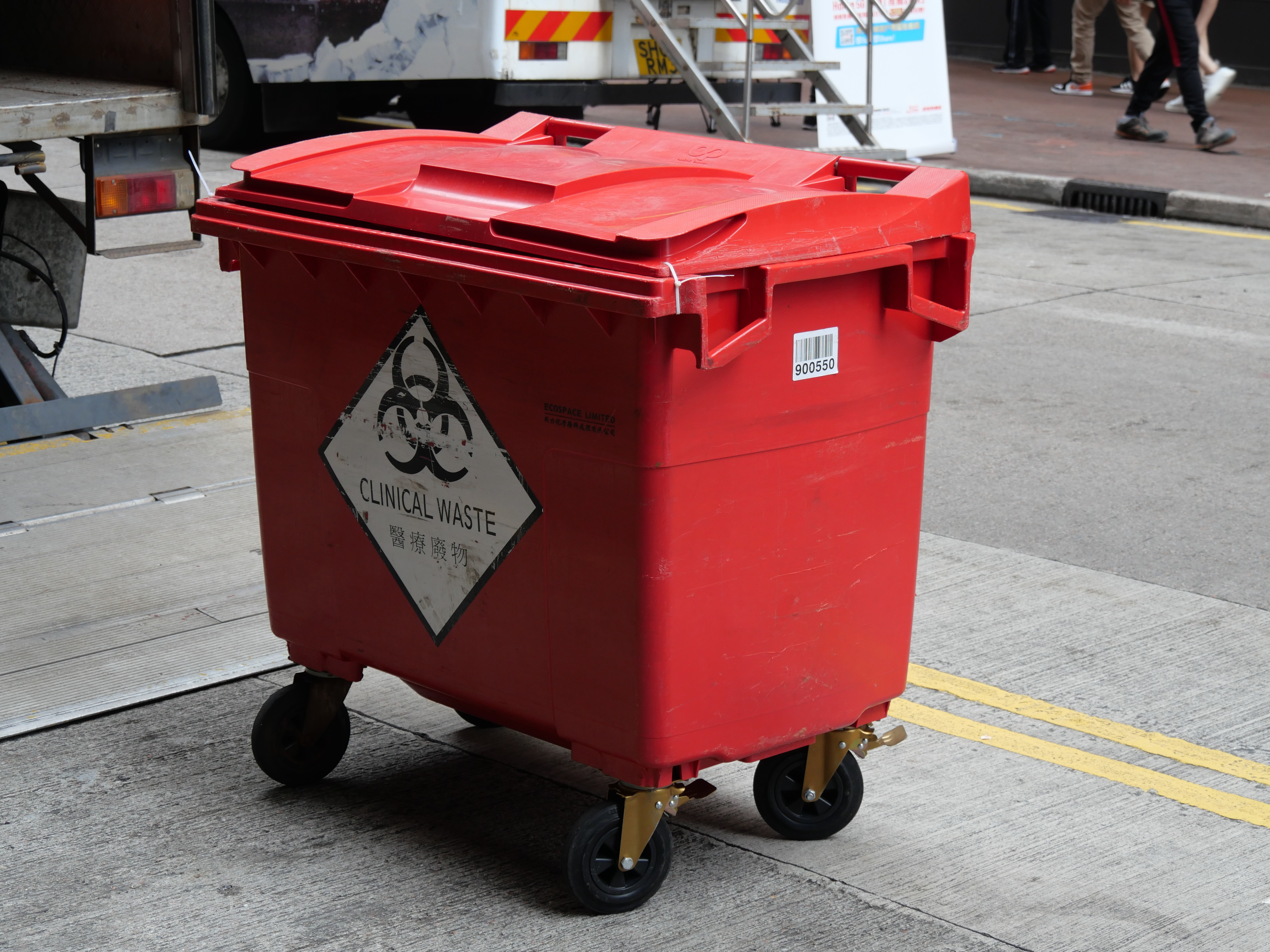
Medical waste bin

Waste collecting involves the collection of municipal waste and hazardous waste, which can introduce exposure to biological, chemical, physical, and psychosocial hazards. In the U.S., hazardous waste collection is monitored by the Environmental Protection Agency (EPA) under the Resource Conservation and Recovery Act (RCRA). Alongside the EPA, the Occupational Safety and Health Administration (OSHA) works closely to establish guidelines for hazardous waste disposal. Municipal waste collectors often are exposed to amounts of hazardous waste because a degree of hazardous waste is permissible in municipal waste; developing countries have a higher risk of hazardous waste contaminating municipal waste due to early infrastructure and less tightly regulated systems. Different waste collecting jobs may have additional hazards or job-specific hazards. Hazardous waste collectors handle highly toxic waste and have an increased risk of exposure to chemical hazards. Medical waste collectors have an increased risk of exposure to biological waste hazards as they handle biomedical waste.

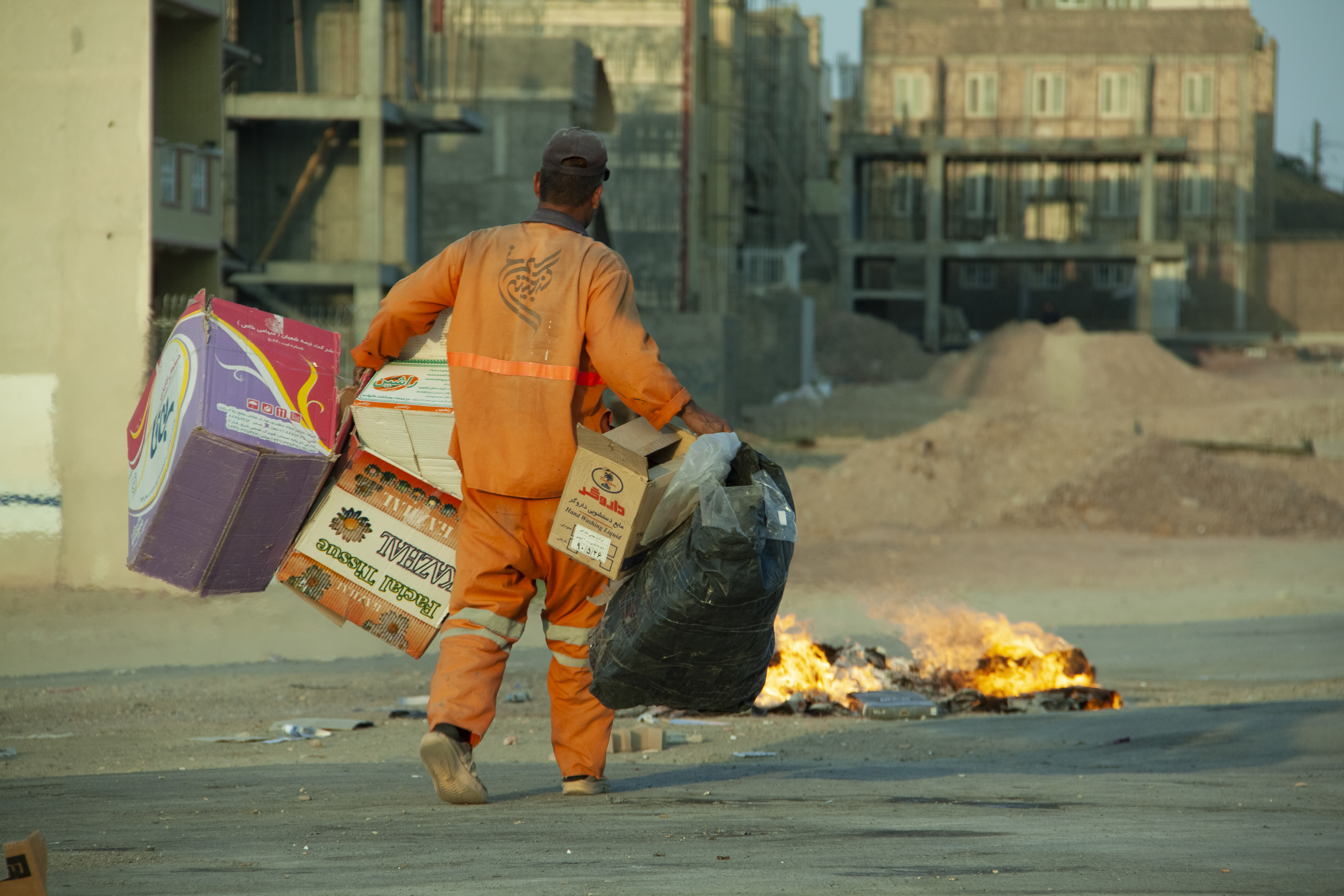
Street sweeper carrying waste in Qom, Iran

Hazards associated with waste-collection include increased exposure to chemical hazards associated with diesel exhaust, heavy metals, VOCs, PCBs, and dust; and biological hazards such as microorganisms like bacteria, fungi and spores, viruses, and protozoa; and physical hazards such as sharp objects, broken objects, heavy objects, and machinery. Physical hazards include ergonomic hazards such as development of WMSD such as sprains, strains, and tears. The job requires much repetitive lifting and pulling of waste material of varying weight, bending over, and movement in awkward positions. Despite assistance from refuse collection trucks, waste collectors often must haul garbage and recyclables to the truck and most still engage in a degree of lifting waste into the vehicle. Many waste collecting jobs are conducted outside, exposing workers to weather conditions, such as extreme heat or cold, that can pose additional health risks, while also putting waste collectors in close proximity to moving vehicles, which can result in them being hit by cars. With a multitude of tangible hazards, waste collectors are at risk for psychosocial hazards as it is a physically taxing job involving long hours, median pay, and not well socially supported.

=== Personal Protective Equipment (PPE) ===
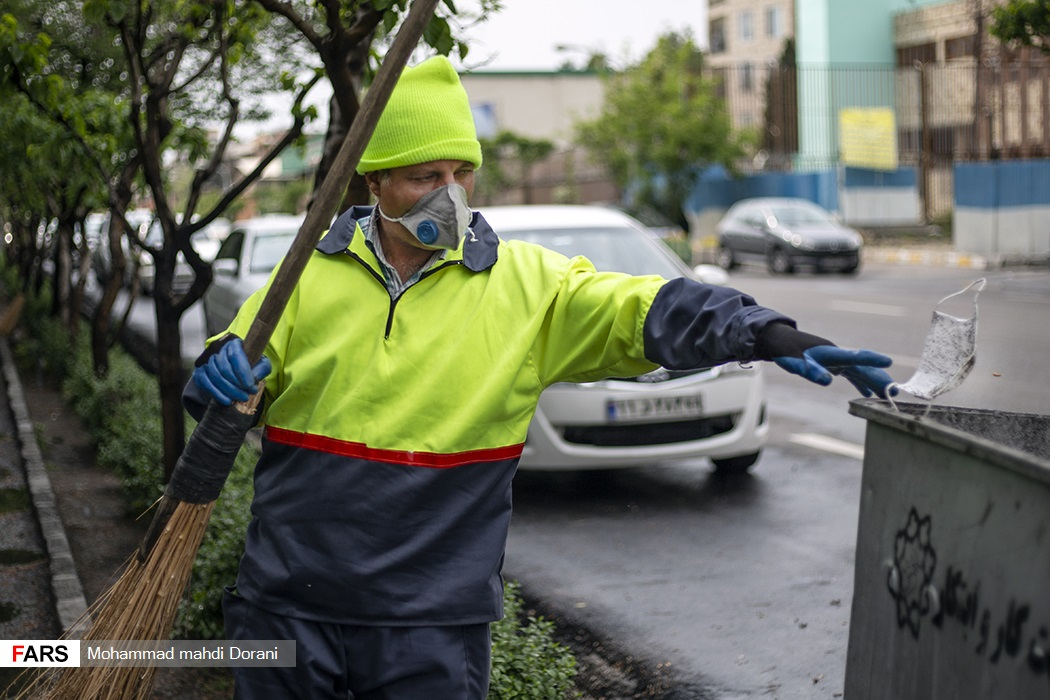
Waste collector in Tehran, Iran

For the U.S., OSHA provides guidelines for PPE. Those disposing of waste, including hazardous waste, medical waste, municipal waste, and other waste from collection sites, are encouraged to follow OSHA guidelines as necessary. Basic PPE includes wearing gloves, goggles or other eye protection equipment, coveralls, face-shield and steel-toed boots or shoes. Proper training is an essential part of protecting waste collectors from injury or illness. RCRA training is required of those who handle hazardous waste.

== Society and culture ==
=== Regional names ===
Many varieties of English have a range of names for waste collectors, from formal job titles for municipal employees, to colloquial and regional terms.

Australian English:	American and Canadian English:	British and Irish English:	Scots And Scottish English:
Wasteman; Garbo (derived from an old street cry) (Note: The Australian term garbo stems from a now-disused street cry used by garbagemen during the early 20th century.)	Garbage man Garbage collector	Binman Dustman	Scaffy Essy Kert (Shetland Scots)

=== People ===
==== Former waste collectors ====
- Derf Backderf worked as a garbageman after finishing high school and wrote a comic called Trashed based on his experiences.
- Georges St-Pierre – a mixed martial artist and UFC Welterweight Champion, worked as a garbage man for 6 months.

==== Fictional waste collectors ====
- "Noddy" Boffin, a major character in Charles Dickens' 1865 novel Our Mutual Friend, has a background as a dustman.
- The films Blood Feast, Scanners III: The Takeover and Child's Play 3 all feature minor characters being murdered with refuse trucks.
- Lala Hagoromo from the 2019 anime Star Twinkle PreCure collected trash for a living due to her poor skills-assessment before becoming Cure Milky.

== See also ==
- Beach cleaner
- Rag-and-bone man
- Curbside collection
- Fecal sludge management
- Litter
- Memphis sanitation strike, U.S. 1968
- Waste management
- Waste picker
