= Environmental hazard =

Dangers to or dangers of environments

The international pictogram for environmentally hazardous materials.

An environmental hazard is something which is hazardous, either to the natural environment or of the natural environment and which is normally present in the specific environment and is dangerous to people present in that environment.

Well-known examples of hazards to the environment include potential oil spills, water pollution, slash and burn deforestation, air pollution, ground fissures, and build-up of atmospheric carbon dioxide. They may apply to a particular part of the environment (slash and burn deforestation) or to the environment as a whole (carbon dioxide buildup in the atmosphere)..

Similarly, a hazard of an environment may be inherent in the whole of that environment, like a drowning hazard is inherent to the general underwater environment, or localised, like potential shark attack is a hazard of those parts of the ocean where sharks that are likely to attack people are likely to exist.

An active volcano may be a hazard to the environment, whether natural or artificial, and at the same time a hazard in and of the environment.

== Types ==
A hazard can be defined as "a source of danger", or "the potential occurrence of a natural or human-induced physical event or trend that may cause loss of life, injury, or other health impacts, as well as damage and loss to property, infrastructure, livelihoods, service provision, ecosystems and environmental resources."

Without the potential for exposure there is no hazard, (and without the potential for harmful consequence there is no risk). Environmental hazards can be categorized in many different ways, but the main distinction is between hazards to the environment, and hazards of the environment.

=== Hazards to the environment ===
Hazards to the environment usually imply hazards that are dangerous to a natural environment of biomes or ecosystems, but artificial environments may also be at risk from exposure to hazards, which may be natural or anthropogenic.

=== Hazards of the environment ===
Hazards of an environment are hazards that are normally present in the specific environment and are dangerous to people, other organisms or property present in that environment. The environment can be natural or built, and may be a work or recreational environment In this case too, the hazards may be natural or anthropogenic.

== Classification by type ==
Broadly, environmental hazards can be categorized as chemical, physical, biological, or psychological, or a combination of these.

Chemical hazards are substances that can cause harm or damage to humans, animals, or the environment. They can be in the form of solids, liquids, gases, mists, dusts, fumes, and vapors. Exposure can occur through inhalation, skin absorption, ingestion, or direct contact. Chemical hazards include substances such as pesticides, solvents, acids, bases, reactive metals, and poisonous gases. Exposure to these substances can result in health effects such as skin irritation, respiratory problems, organ damage, neurological effects, and cancer.

Physical hazards are factors within the environment that can harm the body without necessarily touching it. They include a wide range of environmental factors such as noise, vibration, extreme temperatures, radiation, and ergonomic hazards. Physical hazards may lead to injuries like burns, fractures, hearing loss, vision impairment, or other physical harm. They can be present in many work settings such as construction sites, manufacturing plants, and even office spaces. Ergonomic hazards are conditions that pose a risk of injury to the musculoskeletal system due to requiring a person to work in postures that are harmful, or conditions that make the performance of a task difficult or inefficient, which could endanger the operator. They may be considered a subclass of physical hazards, and are a hazard of the environment, not to it.

Some physical hazards can also pose a risk to the environment.

Biological hazards, also known as biohazards, are organisms or organic substances that pose a threat to the health of living organisms, primarily humans. This can include medical waste, samples of a microorganism, virus, or toxin (from a biological source) that can impact human health. Biological hazards can also include substances harmful to animals. Examples of biological hazards include bacteria, viruses, fungi, other microorganisms and their associated toxins. They may cause a myriad of diseases, from flu to more serious and potentially fatal diseases.

Psychosocial hazards (or psychological hazards) are aspects of work and work environments that can cause psychological harm or mental ill-health. These include factors such as stress, workplace bullying, fatigue, burnout, and violence, among others. These hazards can lead to psychological issues like anxiety, depression, and post-traumatic stress disorder (PTSD). Psychological hazards can exist in any type of workplace, and their management is a crucial aspect of occupational health and safety. By their nature these are hazards of the environment, not to the environment.

== Environmental hazard identification ==
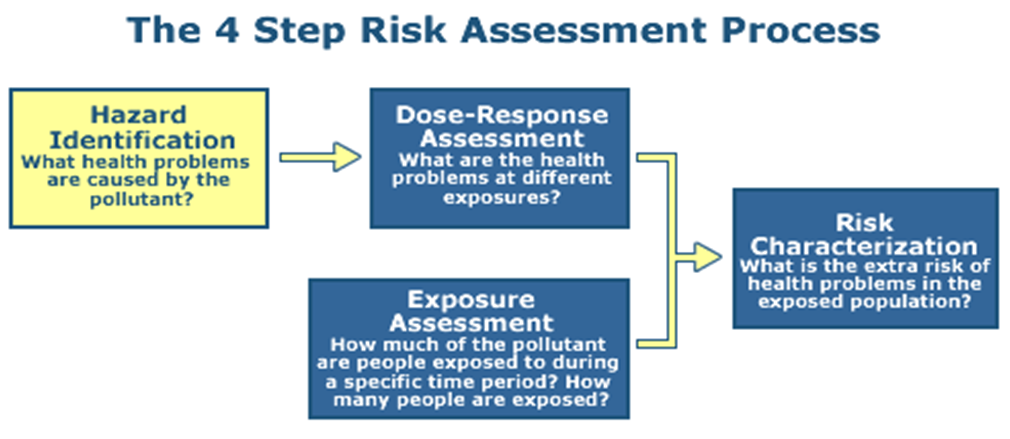
The four-step risk assessment process

Environmental hazard identification is the first step in environmental risk assessment, which is the process of assessing the likelihood, or risk, of adverse effects resulting from a given environmental stressor. Hazard identification is the determination of whether, and under what conditions, a given environmental stressor has the potential to cause harm.

In hazard identification, sources of data on the risks associated with prospective hazards are identified. For instance, if a site is known to be contaminated with a variety of industrial pollutants, hazard identification will determine which of these chemicals could result in adverse effects to human health or to the natural environment, and what effects they could cause. Risk assessors rely on both laboratory (e.g., toxicological) and epidemiological data to make these determinations.

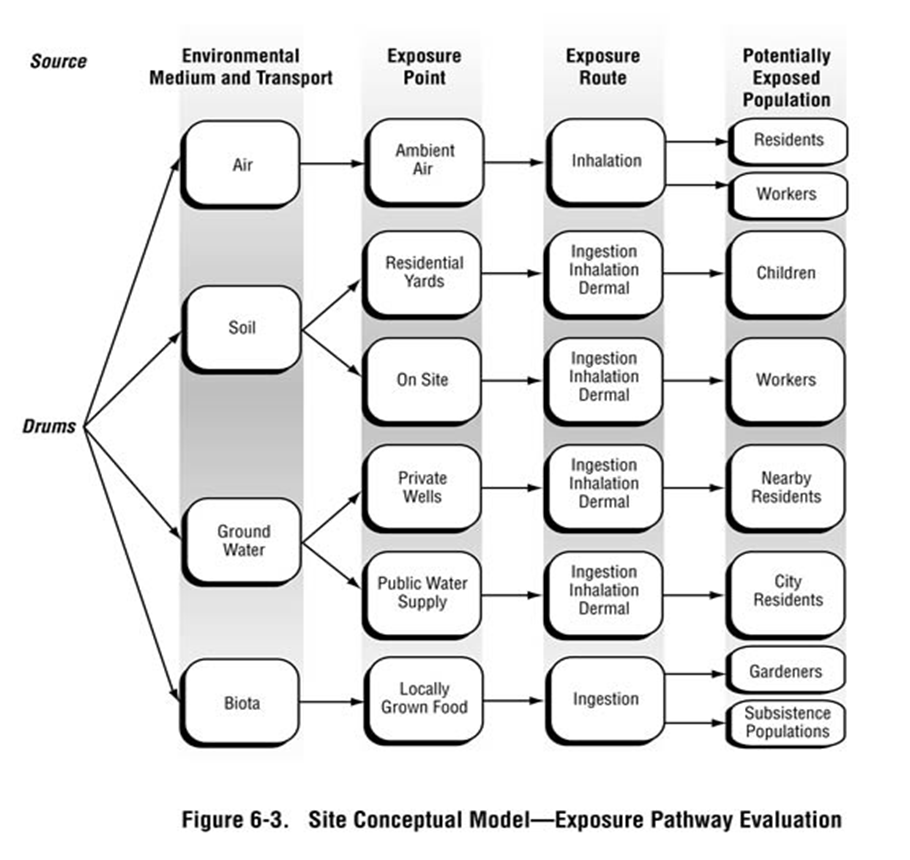
Illustration of a site conceptual model for environmental exposure

=== Conceptual model of exposure ===
Hazards have the potential to cause adverse effects only if they come into contact with populations that may be harmed. For this reason, hazard identification includes the development of a conceptual model of exposure. Conceptual models communicate the pathway connecting sources of a given hazard to the potentially exposed population(s). The U.S. Agency for Toxic Substances and Disease Registry establishes five elements that should be included in a conceptual model of exposure:

- The source of the hazard in question
- Environmental fate and transport, or how the hazard moves and changes in the environment after its release
- Exposure point or area, or the place at which an exposed person comes into contact with the hazard
- Exposure route, or the manner by which an exposed person comes into contact with the hazard (e.g., orally, dermally, or by inhalation)
- Potentially exposed populations.

=== Evaluating hazard data ===
Once a conceptual model of exposure is developed for a given hazard, measurements should be taken to determine the presence and quantity of the hazard. These measurements should be compared to appropriate reference levels to determine whether a hazard exists. For instance, if arsenic is detected in tap water from a given well, the detected concentrations should be compared with regulatory thresholds for allowable levels of arsenic in drinking water. If the detected levels are consistently lower than these limits, arsenic may not be a chemical of potential concern for the purposes of this risk assessment. When interpreting hazard data, risk assessors must consider the sensitivity of the instrument and method used to take these measurements, including any relevant detection limits (i.e., the lowest level of a given substance that an instrument or method is capable of detecting).

== Physical ==
A physical hazard is a type of phenomenon that may cause damage by physical effects, such as:.

- Cosmic ray – High-energy particle, mainly originating outside the Solar System
- Drought – Period with less precipitation than normal
- Earthquake – Sudden movement of the Earth's crust
- Electromagnetic field – Electric and magnetic fields produced by moving charged objects
- Electronic waste – Discarded electronic devices (E-Waste)
- Flood – Water overflow submerging usually-dry lands
- Fog – Atmospheric phenomenon
- Light pollution – Excess artificial light in an environment
- Lightning – Weather phenomenon involving electrostatic discharge
- Noise pollution – Excessive displeasing noise
- Quicksand – Colloid consisting of granular material and water
- Ultraviolet – Form of electromagnetic radiation
- Vibration – Repetitive variation of some measure about a central value
- X-ray – Form of electromagnetic radiation

== Biological ==
Biological hazards, also known as biohazards, refer to biological substances that pose a threat to the health of living organisms, primarily that of humans. This can include medical waste or samples of a microorganism, virus or toxin (from a biological source) that can affect human health. Examples include:

- Allergen – Type of antigen that produces an abnormally vigorous immune response
  - Pollen – Grains containing the male gametophytes of seed plants, a common allergen
- Arbovirus – Class of viruses which are transmitted by arthropods
- Avian influenza – Influenza caused by viruses adapted to birds
- Bovine spongiform encephalopathy – Fatal neurodegenerative disease of cattle (BSE)
- Cholera – Bacterial infection of the small intestine
- Ebola – Hemorrhagic fever caused by ebolaviruses
- Epidemic – Rapid spread of disease affecting a large number of people in a short times
- Food poisoning – Illness from eating contaminated food
- Malaria – Mosquito-borne disease
- Mold – Wooly, dust-like fungal structure or substances
- Onchocerciasis – Human helminthiasis (infection by parasite) (river blindness)
- Pandemic – Widespread, often global, epidemic of severe infectious diseases
- Pathogen – Biological entity that causes disease in its hosts
- Rabies – Deadly viral disease, transmitted through animals
- Severe acute respiratory syndrome – Disease caused by severe acute respiratory syndrome coronavirus (SARS)
- Sick building syndrome – Symptoms of illness attributed to a building

== See also ==
- Hazard analysis – Method for assessing risk
- Hazardous material – Solids, liquids, or gases harmful to people, other organisms, property or the environment
- Natural hazard – Conditions that could lead to a natural disaster
- Occupational hazard – Hazard experienced in the workplace
- Hazardous waste – Ignitable, reactive, corrosive and/or toxic unwanted or unusable materials
