= Blame in organizations =

Blame in organizations may flow between management and staff, or laterally between professionals or partner organizations. In a blame culture, problem-solving is replaced by blame-avoidance. Blame shifting may exist between rival factions. Maintaining one's reputation may be a key factor explaining the relationship between accountability and blame avoidance. The blame culture is a serious issue in certain sectors such as safety-critical domains.

== Blame culture ==
The flow of blame in an organization may be a primary indicator of that organization's robustness and integrity. Blame flowing downwards, from management to staff, or laterally between professionals or partner organizations, indicates organizational failure. In a blame culture, problem-solving is replaced by blame-avoidance. Blame coming from the top generates "fear, malaise, errors, accidents, and passive-aggressive sometimes actual aggressive responses from the bottom", with those at the bottom feeling powerless and lacking emotional safety. Employees have expressed that organizational blame culture made them fear prosecution for errors, accidents and thus unemployment, which may make them more reluctant to report accidents, since trust is crucial to encourage accident reporting. This makes it less likely that weak indicators of safety threats get picked up, thus preventing the organization from taking adequate measures to prevent minor problems from escalating into uncontrollable situations. Several issues identified in organizations with a blame culture contradicts high reliability organizations best practices. Organisational chaos, such as confused roles and responsibilities, is strongly associated with blame culture and workplace bullying. Blame culture promotes a risk aversive approach, which prevent from adequately assessing risks.

When an accident happens in an organization, its reaction tends to favor the individual blame logic, focusing on finding the employees who made the most prominent mistake, often those on the frontline, rather than an organization function logic, which consists in assessing the organization functioning to identify the factors which favored such an accident, despite the latter being more efficient to learn from errors and accidents. A systematic review with nurses found similar results, with a blame culture negatively affecting the nurse's willingness to report errors, increase turnover and stress. Another common strategy when several organizations work together is to blame accidents and failures on each other, or to the last echelon such as the implementing actors. Several authors suggest that this blame culture in organizations is in line and thus favored by the western legal system, where safety is a matter of individual responsibility. Economic pressure is another factor associated with blame culture. Some authors argue that no system is error-free, and thus focusing efforts in blaming individuals can only prevent actual understanding of the various processes that led to the fault.

A study found that the perception of injustice is influenced by both the individuals assertions of their morality domain, and by their identification to the organization: the higher one identifies with the organization, the less likely one will see the organization's actions as unjust. Individuals were also increasingly suspicious when observing their peers being affected by injustices, which is a behavior in line with deontic ethics.

== Typology of institutions and blames ==
According to Mary Douglas, blame is systematically used in the micro politics of institutions, with three latent functions: explaining disasters; justifying allegiances, and stabilizing existing institutional regimes. Within a politically stable regime, blame tends to be asserted on the weak or unlucky one, but in a less stable regime, blame shifting may involve a battle between rival factions. Douglas was interested in how blame stabilizes existing power structures within institutions or social groups. She devised a two-dimensional typology of institutions, the first attribute being named "group", which is the strength of boundaries and social cohesion, the second "grid", the degree and strength of the hierarchy.

Mary Douglas' typology of institutions
	Low group	High group
High grid	Isolate	Bureaucracy
Low grid	Market	Clan

According to Douglas, blame will fall on different entities depending on the institutional type. For markets, blame is used in power struggles between potential leaders. In bureaucracies, blame tends to flow downwards and is attributed to a failure to follow rules. In a clan, blame is asserted on outsiders or involves allegations of treachery, to suppress dissidence and strengthen the group's ties. In the 4th type, isolation, the individuals are facing the competitive pressures of the marketplace alone, in other words there is a condition of fragmentation with a loss of social cohesion, potentially leading to feelings of powerlessness and fatalism, and this type was renamed by various other authors into "donkey jobs". It is suggested that the progressive changes in managerial practices in healthcare is leading to an increase in donkey jobs. The group and hierarchy strength may also explain why healthcare experts, who often devise clinical procedures on the field, may be refractory to new safety guidelines from external regulators, perceiving them as competing procedures changing cultures and imposing new lines of authority.

== Blaming and transparency ==
The requirement of accountability and transparency, assumed to be key for good governance, worsen the behaviors of blame avoidance, both at the individual and institutional levels, as is observed in various domains such as politics and healthcare. Indeed, institutions tend to be risk-averse and blame-averse, and where the management of societal risks (the threats to society) and institutional risks (threats to the organizations managing the societal risks) are not aligned, there may be organizational pressures to prioritize the management of institutional risks at the expense of societal risks. Furthermore, "blame-avoidance behaviour at the expense of delivering core business is a well-documented organizational rationality". The willingness of maintaining one's reputation may be a key factor explaining the relationship between accountability and blame avoidance. This may produce a "risk colonization", where institutional risks are transferred to societal risks, as a strategy of risk management. Some researchers argue that there is "no risk-free lunch" and "no blame-free risk", an analogy to the "no free lunch" adage.

== Sectors ==
=== Healthcare ===
Blame culture is a serious issue in safety-critical domains, where human errors can have dire consequences, for instance in hospitals and in aviation. However, as several healthcare organizations were raising concerns, studies found that increasing regulatory transparency in health care had the unintended consequence of increasing defensive practice and blame shifting, for example by obfuscating errors reporting. Following rare but high-profile scandals, there are political incentives for a "self-interested blame business" promoting a presumption of "guilty until proven innocent" A literature review found that human resource management plays an important role in health care organizations: when such organizations rely predominantly on a hierarchical, compliance-based management system, blame culture is more likely to happen, whereas when employees involvement in decision making is more elicited, a just or learning culture is more likely.

Blame culture has been suggested as a major source of medical errors. The World Health Organization, the United States' Agency for Healthcare Research and Quality and United Kingdom's National Health Service recognize the issue of blame culture in healthcare organizations, and recommends to promote a no-blame culture, or just culture, in order to increase patients' safety, which is the prevention of errors and adverse effects to patients. Other authors suggest to also provide emotional support to help healthcare professionals deal with the emotions elicited by their patients. Yet others have pointed out the lack of nomination among healthcare staff as directors, so that those on the field are excluded from the decision processes, and thus lack intrinsic motivation to enhance patients safety processes.

In the United Kingdom, a 2018 survey of 7887 doctors found that 78% said the NHS resources are inadequate to ensure patients safety and quality of services, 95% are fearful of making a medical error and that the fear has increased in the past 5 years, 55% worry they may be unfairly blamed for errors due to systems failings and pressures, and 49% said they practice defensively. A sizeable proportion of these doctors recognized the issue of bullying, harassment or undermining, 29% declaring it was sometimes an issue and 10% saying it was often an issue. Dozens of UK doctors under fitness-to-practice investigations committed suicide.

In 2018, an investigation into the cases of 11 deaths in Gosport War Memorial Hospital led to the discovery of an institutionally-wide inappropriate administration of powerful painkillers without medical justification, leading to the death of hundreds of patients since the 1990s. This scandal is often described as an example of the consequences blame culture, with the NHS pressuring whistleblowers, which prompted officials to address more actively this issue to avoid seeing it repeated elsewhere.

=== Aviation ===
Aviation pioneered the shift from individual blaming to systems failure investigation, and incentivized it with the Aviation Safety Reporting System, a platform to self-report safety incidents in exchange of immunity from prosecution. Since 15 November 2015, the European Occurrence Reporting Regulation (EU Reg. 376/2014) exhorts the aviation industry to implement a just culture systematically.

=== Politics ===
Blame avoidance is an often observed behavior in politics, which is worsened when meeting the doctrine of transparency, assumed to be key for good governance.

When politicians shift blames under polarized conditions, the public sector organizations are often the target.

=== Social workers ===
For social workers, by emphasizing the professional as being autonomous and accountable, they are considered as individual workers with full agency, which occludes the structural constraints and influences of their organizations, thus promoting a blame culture on the individuals. This emphasis on individual's accountability is similarly observed in healthcare. In UK, blame culture prevented the adequate collaboration necessary between social workers and healthcare providers.

== See also ==
- Abusive supervision
- Kiss up kick down
- Management
- Organization
- Organizational effectiveness
- Theory of the firm
- Workplace bullying
- Workplace listening
