= Hazardous energy =

Hazardous energy in occupational safety and health is any source of energy (including electrical, mechanical, thermal, chemical, hydraulic, and pneumatic sources of energy) that "can be hazardous to workers", such as from discharge of stored energy. Failure to control the unexpected release of energy can lead to machine-related injuries or fatalities. The risk from these sources of energy can be controlled in a number of ways, including access control procedures such as lockout-tagout.

== Types of Hazardous Energy ==
Hazardous energy in occupational settings exists in many categories, all forms have distinct risks depending on the equipment and work environments.

Categories include:

- "Electrical energy, which can result in shock, burns or arc flash injuries when workers are exposed to energized conductors or equipment."
- "Mechanical energy, consisting of rotating members, reciprocating arms, moving belts, gears, cutting teeth and any parts that impact or shear."
- "Hydraulic and pneumatic energy, energy stored in the form of pressurized fluid making it application of fluid power. Fluid power is the use of pressurized fluids to generate, control and transfer power."
- "Thermal energy refers to energy within a system that's created by the random motion of molecules and atoms. As motion increases more energy is produced this energy is transferred in the form of heat."
- Chemical energy, involving reactions or stored chemicals that may release toxic, flammable, or explosive substances."

== Hazards and Workplace Risks ==
The number one danger associated with hazardous energy is unexpected startup of machinery or the release of stored energy. Release of energy can happen even when equipment seems to be completely de-energized. These situations can lead to severe injuries, including amputations, electrocution, and fatalities.

Stored energy can stay in systems even after shutdown. For example:

- Electrical capacitors may retain charge after shutdown.
- Hydraulic systems may remain pressurized.
- Mechanical components may be under tension or gravity load.

Workers performing maintenance and routine cleaning are especially vulnerable. Without proper protection, minor mistakes can result in catastrophic outcomes. Studies and safety agencies have consistently identified failure to control hazardous energy as a leading cause of industrial accidents.

== Control Methods and Safety Procedures ==
One of the most popular controls of hazardous energy is commonly achieved through lockout-tagout (LOTO) procedures. LOTO is designed to isolate energy sources and prevent machines from being energized during servicing. Under these procedures, energy-isolating devices are physically locked in a safe position and clearly labeled to indicate that maintenance is in progress. Other than LOTO engineering controls such as machine guarding and interlocks provide more layers of electrical protection.

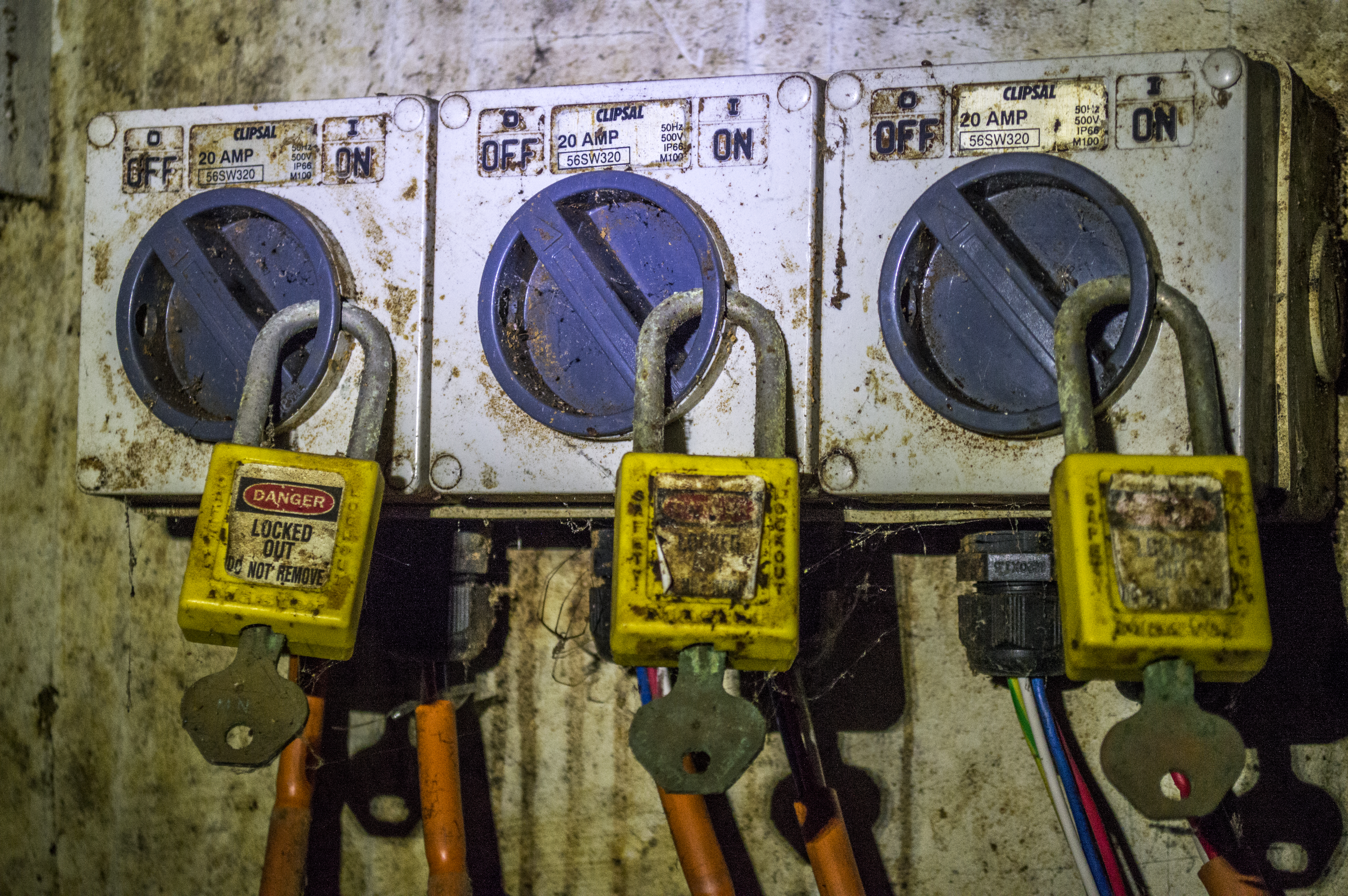
Lockout-tagout devices applied to prevent accidental energization during maintenance.

A typical hazardous energy control process includes:

- "Verifying all energy sources that are connected to equipment"
- "Completely shutting down the system"
- "Isolating energy sources"
- "Attaching lockout or tagout devices"
- "Releasing or containing stored energy"
- "Verifying isolation before maintenance begins"

These procedures are formalized in regulatory standards such as 29 CFR 1910.147 which establishes minimum requirements for protecting workers from hazardous energy during maintenance activities.

== Training and Employee Responsibilities ==
Correct training is an important component of any hazardous energy control. OSHA demands all workers whom perform servicing on machinery must be trained to understand the dangers of hazardous energy.

Training requirements most of the time apply to three genres of employees:

- Authorized employees are workers who "locks out or tags out machines or equipment in order to perform servicing or maintenance on that machine or equipment"
- Affected employees "become authorized employees when that employee's duties include performing servicing or maintenance." Affected employees must be trained to understand LOTO and know they shouldn't try to reenergize the machine.
- Other employees "whose work operations are or may be in an area where energy control procedures may be utilized, shall be instructed about the procedure, and about the prohibition relating to attempts to restart or reenergize machines or equipment which are locked out or tagged out."

"Retraining shall be provided for all authorized and affected employees whenever a periodic inspection reveals, or whenever the employer has reason to believe, that there are deviations from or inadequacies in the employee's knowledge or use of the energy control procedures."
