= Occupational risk assessment =

An occupational risk assessment is an evaluation of how much potential danger a hazard can have to a person in a workplace environment. The assessment takes into account possible scenarios in addition to the probability of their occurrence, and the results. The five types of hazards to be aware of are safety (those that can cause injury), chemicals, biological, physical, and ergonomic (those that can cause musculoskeletal disorders).

Risks in a workplace can lead to extremely negative consequences. It can be especially dangerous when a person is exposed to the same hazards routinely. In order to protect employees, hazards need to be first acknowledged and the severity recognized. Occupational risk assessments provide this information, allowing limits for safe levels to be put in place. By maintaining appropriate standards, employees’ well-being is protected. A United States public health organization that conducts occupational risk assessments is the National Institute for Occupational Health and Safety (NIOSH). Though these evaluations often focus on chemicals, they are useful in looking at other hazards.

== Process ==
To appropriately access hazards there are two parts that must occur. Firstly, there must be an "exposure assessment" which measures the likelihood of worker contact and the level of contact. Secondly, a "risk characterization" must be made which measures the probability and severity of the possible health risks. The information gathered is then used to approximate the health risk with varying concentrations of exposure. The goal is to assure that no worker experiences any health or functional impairment.

The first step to an occupational risk assessment is the identification of a hazard, which is a circumstance, a cause or an action that has the capability to harm whether through injury or illness. In a workplace it is any hazard that can cause harm to an employee. Yet, there is more to hazard identification then simply knowing that something can cause risk. Effects have to be known and who might be vulnerable. To be able to accurately estimate safe levels all co-factors must be known, including the conditions that modify the effect and factors of uncertainty.

An essential part of a risk assessment is the dose–response assessment. This is an evaluation that determines the correlation between the amount of substance absorbed by the worker and the effects this uptake. This second step of the risk assessment is designed to find the amount of the substance that causes little to no effect which is called the point of departure (PoD). Statisticians are required to construct models to estimate the PoD using toxicological information in addition to epidemiological data. This task is often made difficult by data errors as well selecting the correct model to use. To mitigate error a sensitivity analysis is performed. These take in to account other risk assessment approaches, any inadequacies, or assumptions made. This analysis produces a range of possible approximations of the dose–response relationship.

The final step of an occupational risk assessment is risk characterization. This is where the data gathered is combined to create estimations about safe levels. NIOSH makes Recommended Exposure Limits (REL), while other organizations may create occupational exposure limits (OEL). The difference is due to the NIOSH’s authority to only give guidance. The approximate danger an employee might face while working, includes the likelihood of the event as well as the acuity of the negative effects on health.

Occupational risk assessments are only estimations and must be done in a logical coherent fashion using probability. Due to an introduction of assumptions and differentiated data the risk assessments must take caution to find a safe level that has an equilibrium between too high and too low of an estimate. To accomplish this goal comprehensive studies are incredibly important and must match the goals of the assessment while having "transparency, clarity, consistency, and reasonableness."
