= Lockout–tagout =

Safe isolation of dangerous equipment during maintenance or testing

Lockout Tagout hasp can accommodate up to 6 padlocks, can be used during group LOTO procedure.

Lock out, tag out or lockout/tagout (LOTO) is a safety procedure that ensures dangerous equipment is properly shut off and not able to be restarted prior to the completion of maintenance or repair work. It requires that hazardous energy sources be "isolated and rendered inoperative" before work is started on the equipment in question. The isolated power sources are then locked and a tag is placed on the lock identifying the worker and reason the LOTO is placed on it. The worker then holds the key for the lock, ensuring that only that worker can remove the lock and start the equipment. This prevents accidental startup of equipment while it is in a hazardous state or while a worker is in direct contact with it.

Lockout–tagout is used across industries as a safe method of working on hazardous equipment and is mandated by law in some countries.

== Procedure ==
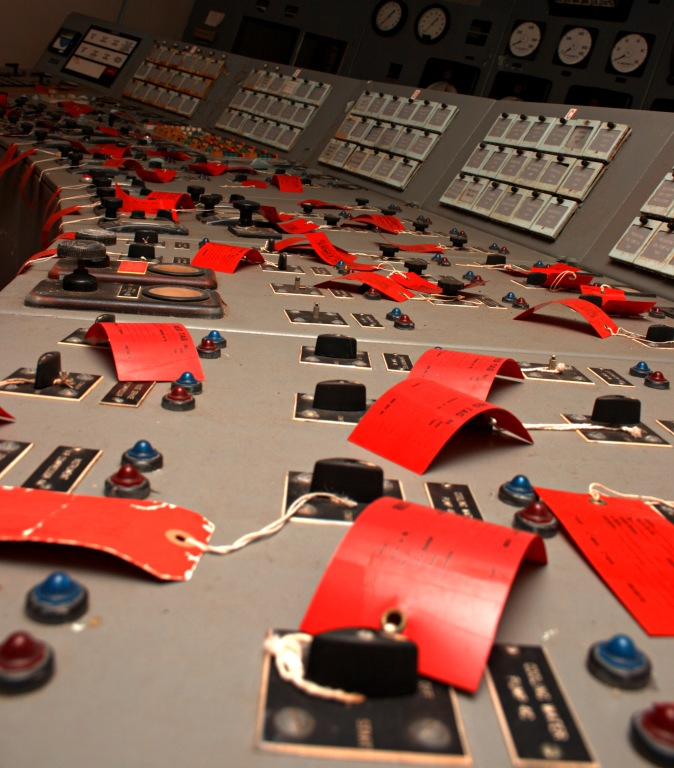
Tags left in place in a powerplant after it was shut down, decommissioned, and abandoned

Disconnecting or making safe the equipment involves the removal of all energy sources and is known as isolation. The steps necessary to isolate equipment are often documented in an isolation procedure or a lockout tagout procedure. The isolation procedure generally includes the following tasks:

1. Announce shut off
2. Identify the energy sources
3. Isolate the energy sources
4. Lock and tag the energy sources
5. Demonstrate that the equipment isolation is effective

The locking and tagging of the isolation point ensures that others cannot de-isolate the device. Emphasizing the last step, the entire process can also be referred to as lock, tag, and try.

In the United States, the National Electrical Code states that a safety/service disconnect must be installed within sight of serviceable equipment. The safety disconnect ensures the equipment can be isolated and there is less chance of someone turning the power back on if they can see the work going on.

In industrial processes, it may be difficult to identify sources of danger. For example, a food processing plant may have input and output tanks and high-temperature cleaning systems connected, but not in the same room or area of the factory.

Safety equipment manufacturers provide a range of isolation devices specifically designed to fit various switches, valves and effectors. For example, most circuit breakers have a provision to have a small padlock attached to prevent their activation. For other devices such as ball or gate valves, plastic pieces which either fit against the pipe and prevent movement, or clamshell-style objects which completely surround the valve and prevent its manipulation are used.

A common feature of these devices is their bright color, usually red, to increase visibility and allow workers to readily see if a device is isolated. Also, the devices are usually of such a design and construction to prevent it being removed with any moderate force; for example, an isolation device does not have to resist a chainsaw, but if an operator forcibly removes it, it will be immediately visible that it has been tampered with.

To protect one or more circuit breakers in an electrical panel, a lockout–tagout device called the Panel Lockout can be used. It keeps the panel door locked and prevents the panel cover from being removed. The circuit breakers remain in the off position while electrical work is done.

=== Group lockout ===
When two or more people are working on the same or different parts of a larger overall system, there must be multiple holes to lock the device. To expand the number of available holes, the lockout device is secured with a folding scissors clamp that has many pairs of padlock holes capable of keeping it closed. Each worker applies their own padlock to the clamp. The locked-out machinery cannot be activated until all workers have removed their padlocks from the clamp.

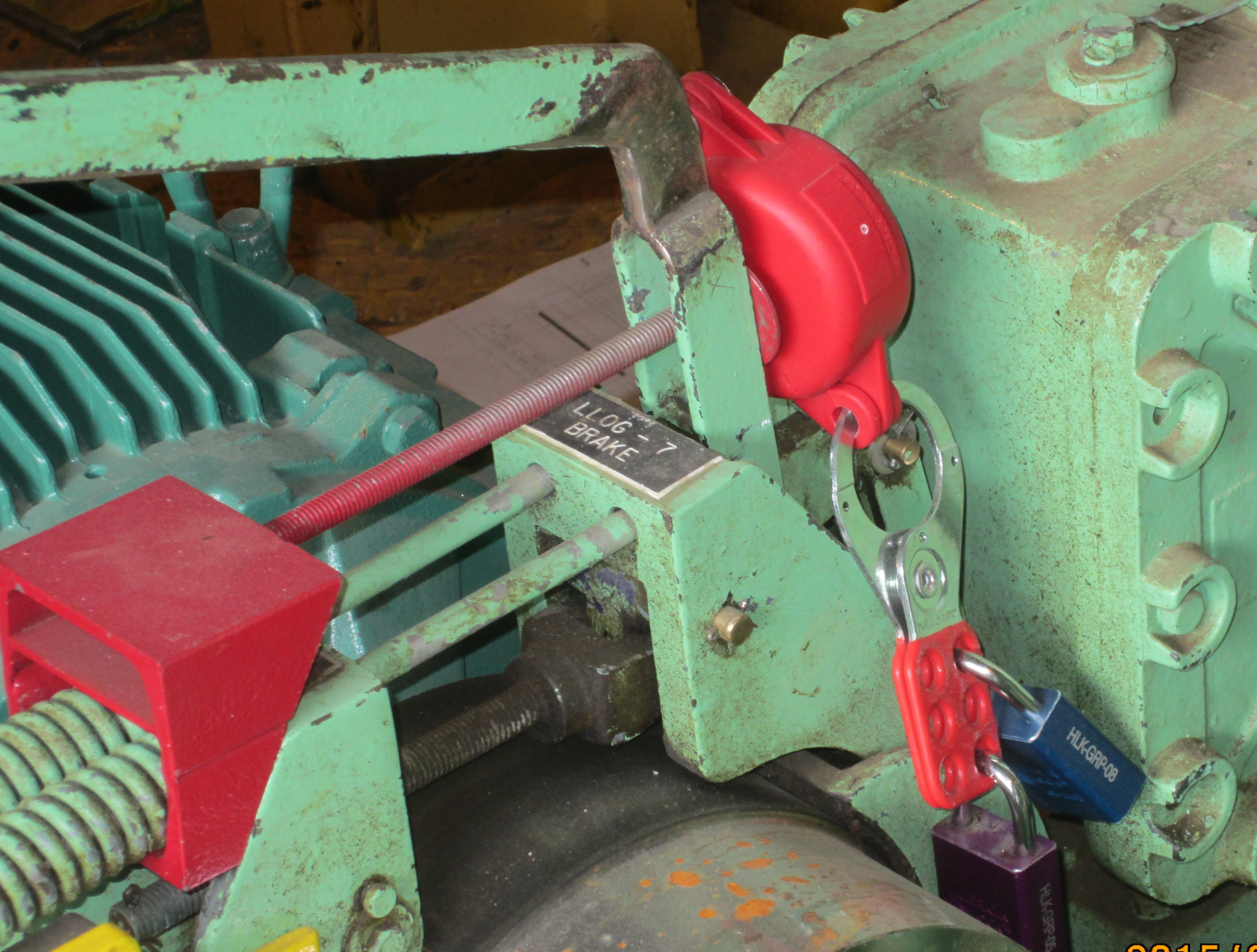
A lockout device applied to a hoist brake. This prevents unintended movement of the hoist. The lockout hasp is secured with two padlocks.

In the United States a lock selected by color, shape or size, such as a red padlock, is used to designate a standard safety device, locking and securing hazardous energy. No two keys or locks should ever be the same. A person's lock and tag must only be removed by the individual who installed the lock and tag unless removal is accomplished under the direction of the employer. Employer procedures and training for such removal must have been developed, documented and incorporated into the employer energy control program.

=== Identification ===
According to US federal regulation 29 CFR 1910.147, the tag must have an identification showing the name of the person doing the lock and tag. This is not mandatory in the EU.

=== The five safety steps ===
According to the European standard EN 50110-1 ("Operation of electrical installations"), the safety procedure before working on electric equipment comprises the following five steps:

1. disconnect completely;
2. secure against re-connection;
3. verify that the installation is dead;
4. carry out earthing and short-circuiting; and
5. provide protection against adjacent live parts.

== Site policies regarding lockout–tagout ==
A site lockout–tagout policy will provide workers with an explanation of the safety goals of the policy, will identify steps required for a lockout–tagout, and will advise of the consequences of failure to carry out the policy. A documented lockout–tagout policy may be required by government regulations in some jurisdictions, for example in the United States for sites regulated by OSHA rules.

== Standards by country ==
=== Canada ===
All Canadian jurisdictions legally require lockout for certain work. However, the specific activities required for appropriate lockout are usually not specified in law. These specifics are provided through industry standards. The Canadian Standards Association's standard CSA Z460, based on industry, labour and government consultations, outlines the specific activities of a lockout program and is usually considered the appropriate standard of good practice for lock out. All Canadian health and safety legislation places a general duty on an employer to take all reasonable precautions and carrying out this standard of good practice is usually considered a mark of due diligence.

=== EU ===
In the EU, the original guidelines and requirements were influenced by those in the US.

89/655 paragraph 2.14 states that "every piece of equipment must be fitted with clearly visible devices with which it can be separated from every energy source" [EU Guidelines 89/655 (Paragraph 2.14)]. This indicates that all workplace machinery should be fitted with permanent LOTO solutions for easy and safe lockout–tagout procedures.

=== United Kingdom ===
There are a few instances across UK regulations that refer to lockout–tagout indirectly. The use of lockout–tagout is not currently enforced in the UK but has been proven to be best practice for multiple UK industries.

BS7671:2008 is a regulation in the UK that ensures that all wiring and electrical installations completed within any building is of the highest standard. It also states that "Every employer shall ensure that where appropriate, work equipment is provided with a suitable means to isolate it from all its sources of energy. Every employer shall take appropriate measures to ensure that reconnection of any energy source to work equipment does not expose any person using the equipment to any risk to their health or safety" (Provision of Work Equipment Regulations – Regulation 19 – Isolation from Sources of Energy).

The Provision and Use of Work Equipment Regulations 1998 (1999 in Northern Ireland; PUWER) is the key regulation that is enforced within the manufacturing industry within the UK. This reinforces that employers should make all machinery safe for use, including adding additional precautions such as extra guards and safer PPE (Personal Protective Equipment). Machinery should also be inspected at regular intervals to ensure it is in a continued "safe to use" state.

There are citations within the PUWER regulations that argue the use of safety devices such as lockout–tagout, however at no point do the regulations state this outright.

=== United States ===
Lockout–tagout in the US has five required components to be fully compliant with OSHA law. The five components are:

1. Lockout–Tagout Procedures (documentation)
2. Lockout–Tagout Training (for authorized employees and affected employees)
3. Lockout–Tagout Policy (often referred to as a program)
4. Lockout–Tagout Devices and Locks
5. Lockout–Tagout Auditing – Every 12 months, every procedure must be reviewed as well as a review of authorized employees

In industry this is an OSHA standard, as well as for electrical NFPA 70E. OSHA's standard on the Control of Hazardous Energy (Lockout-Tagout), found in 29 CFR 1910.147, spells out the steps employers must take to prevent accidents associated with hazardous energy. The standard addresses practices and procedures necessary to disable machinery and prevent the release of potentially hazardous energy while maintenance or servicing activities are performed.

Two other OSHA standards also contain energy control provisions: 29 CFR 1910.269 and 29 CFR 1910.333. In addition, some standards relating to specific types of machinery contain de-energization requirements such as 29 CFR 1910.179(l)(2)(i)(c)(requiring the switches to be "open and locked in the open position" before performing preventive maintenance on overhead and gantry cranes). The provisions of Part 1910.147 apply in conjunction with these machine-specific standards to assure that employees will be adequately protected against hazardous energy.

==== Compliance ====
If employees service or maintain machines where the unexpected startup, energization, or the release of stored energy could cause injury, the OSHA standard applies, unless an equivalent level of protection can be proven. Equivalent level of protection may be achieved in some cases through standard operating procedures (SOP) and custom machine guarding solutions that are combined to establish machine control to protect the worker for specific tasks. The standard applies to all sources of energy, including, but not limited to: mechanical, electrical, hydraulic, pneumatic, chemical, and thermal energy.

The standard does not cover electrical hazards from work on, near, or with conductors or equipment in electric utilization (premise wiring) installations, which are outlined by 29 CFR Part 1910 Subpart S. The specific lockout and tagout provisions for electrical shock and burn hazards can be found in 29 CFR Part 1910.333. Controlling hazardous energy in installations for the exclusive purpose of power generation, transmission, and distribution, including related equipment for communication or metering, is covered by 29 CFR 1910.269.

The standard also does not cover the agriculture, construction, and maritime industries or oil and gas well drilling and servicing. Other standards concerning the control of hazardous energy, however, apply in many of these industries and situations.

==== Exceptions ====
The standard does not apply to general industry service and maintenance activities in the following situations, when:

- Exposure to hazardous energy is controlled completely by unplugging the equipment from an electric outlet and where the employee doing the service or maintenance has exclusive control of the plug. This applies only if electricity is the only form of hazardous energy to which employees may be exposed. This exception encompasses many portable hand tools and some cord and plug connected machinery and equipment.
- An employee performs hot-tap operations on pressurized pipelines that distribute gas, steam, water, or petroleum products, for which the employer shows the following:
  - Continuity of service is essential;
  - Shutdown of the system is impractical; and
  - The employee follows documented procedures and uses special equipment that provides proven, effective employee protection.
- The employee is performing minor tool changes or other minor servicing activities that are routine, repetitive, and integral to production, and that occur during normal production operations. In these cases, employees must have effective, alternative protection.
