= Physical hazard =

Hazard due to a physical agent

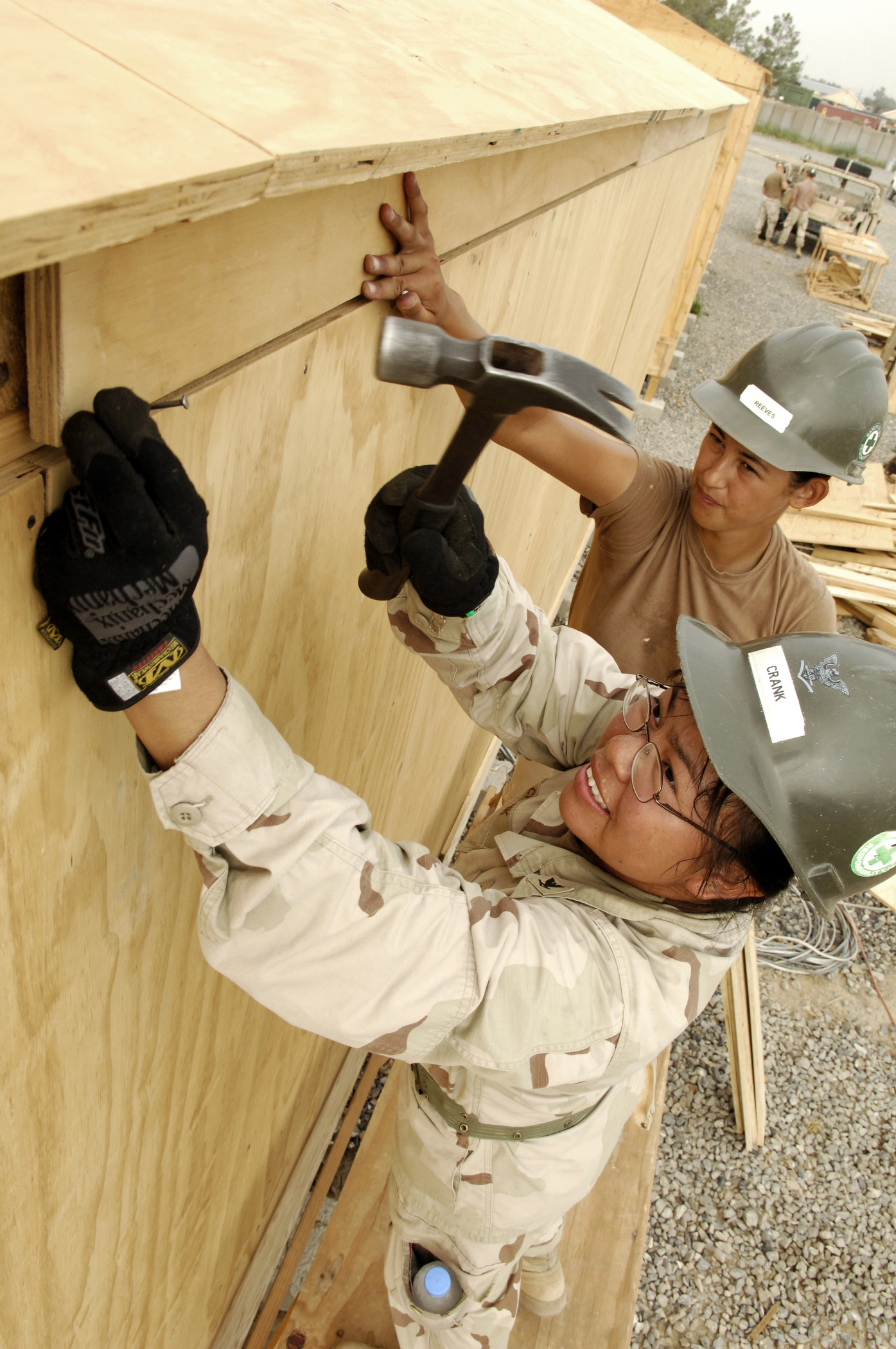
Hard hats, an example of personal protective equipment, can protect against physical hazards

A physical hazard is an agent, factor or circumstance that can cause harm with contact. They can be classified as type of occupational hazard or environmental hazard. Physical hazards include ergonomic hazards, radiation, heat and cold stress, vibration hazards, and noise hazards. Engineering controls are often used to mitigate physical hazards.

Physical hazards are a common source of injuries in many industries. They are perhaps unavoidable in certain industries, such as construction and mining, but over time people have developed safety methods and procedures to manage the risks of physical danger in the workplace. Employment of children may pose special problems.

A physical hazard is also a naturally occurring process that has the potential to create loss or damage. Physical hazards include earthquakes, floods, fires, and tornadoes. Physical hazards often have both human and natural elements. For example, flood problems can be affected by the natural elements of climate fluctuations and storm frequency, and by land drainage and building in a flood plain, human elements. Geomagnetic storms can disrupt or damage technological infrastructure, and disorient species with magnetoception. Another physical hazard, X-rays, naturally occur from solar radiation, but have also been utilized by humans for medical purposes; however, overexposure can lead to cancer, skin burns, and tissue damage.

== Falls ==
Falls are a common cause of occupational injuries and fatalities, especially in construction, extraction, transportation, healthcare, and building cleaning and maintenance. Circumstances like floor holes and wall opening, misused fall protection, slippery, cluttered, or unstable walking surfaces, unprotected edges and unsafely situated ladders are associated with occupational fall injuries.

According to 2014 published data from the Bureau of Labor Statistics, 261,930 private industry and government workers lost one or more days of work and around 798 workers died as a result of fall injuries in the workplace. There was a general upward trend in fatal fall injuries which increased 25 percent overall from 2011 to 2016. For carpenters, heavy and tractor-trailer truck drivers, tree trimmers and pruners, and roofers, fall injuries increased by more than 25 percent in 2016. The highest rate of nonfatal fall injuries experienced in the health services, and the wholesale and retail industries, while the highest counts for fall-related deaths associated with the construction industry. According to Bureau of Labor Statistics, there were total 991 construction-related fall incidents in 2016. In the United States, fall-related fatalities result in a significant financial burden of estimated $70 billion annually in the form of worker's compensation and occupational fall incident related medical costs. The international public health community works to reduce fall injuries at work settings by developing strategies because many other countries face similar problems in the workplace as in the United States.

== Machines ==
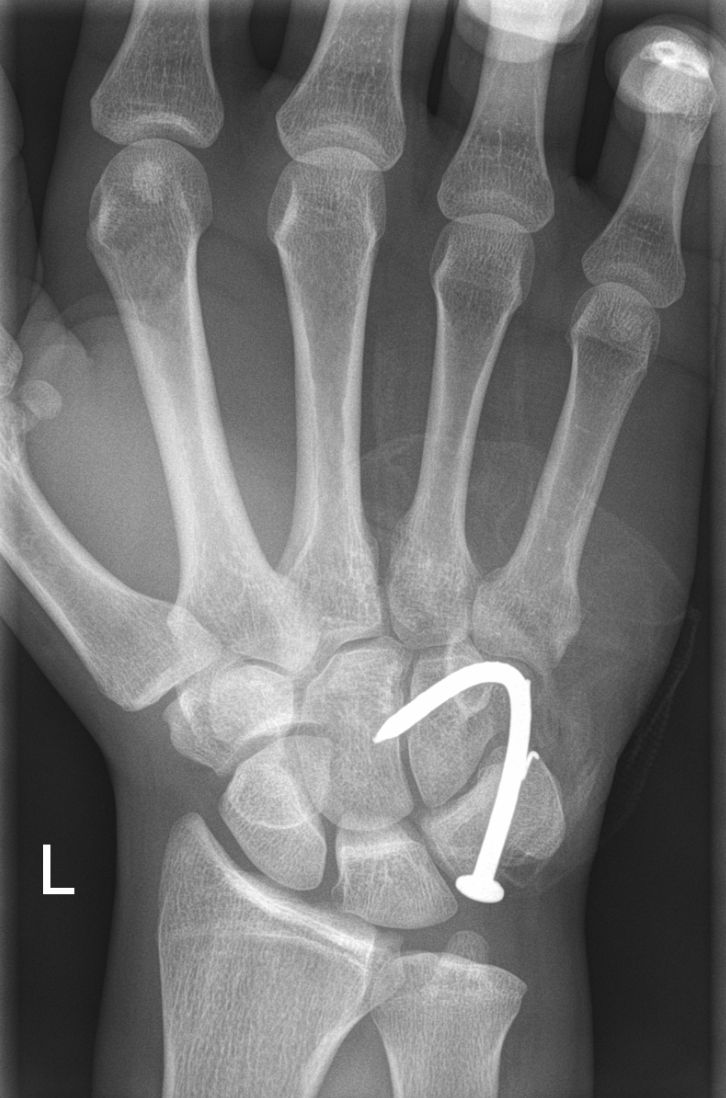
A nail gun-related injury

Machines are commonplace in many industries, including manufacturing, mining, construction and agriculture, and can be dangerous to workers. Many machines involve moving parts, sharp edges, hot surfaces and other hazards with the potential to crush, burn, cut, shear, stab or otherwise strike or wound workers if used unsafely. Various safety measures exist to minimize these hazards, including lockout-tagout procedures for machine maintenance and roll over protection systems for vehicles. According to the United States Bureau of Labor Statistics, machine-related injuries were responsible for 64,170 cases that required days away from work in 2008. More than a quarter of these cases required more than 31 days spent away from work. That same year, machines were the primary or secondary source of over 600 work-related fatalities. Machines are also often involved indirectly in worker deaths and injuries, such as in cases in which a worker slips and falls, possibly upon a sharp or pointed object. Power tools, used in many industries, present a number of hazards due to sharp moving parts, vibrations, or noise. The transportation sector bears many risks for the health of commercial drivers, for example from vibration, long periods of sitting, work stress and exhaustion. These problems occur in Europe but in other parts of the world the situation is even worse. More drivers die in accidents due to security defects in vehicles. Long waiting times at borders cause that drivers are away from home and family much longer and even increase the risk of HIV infections.

== Confined spaces ==
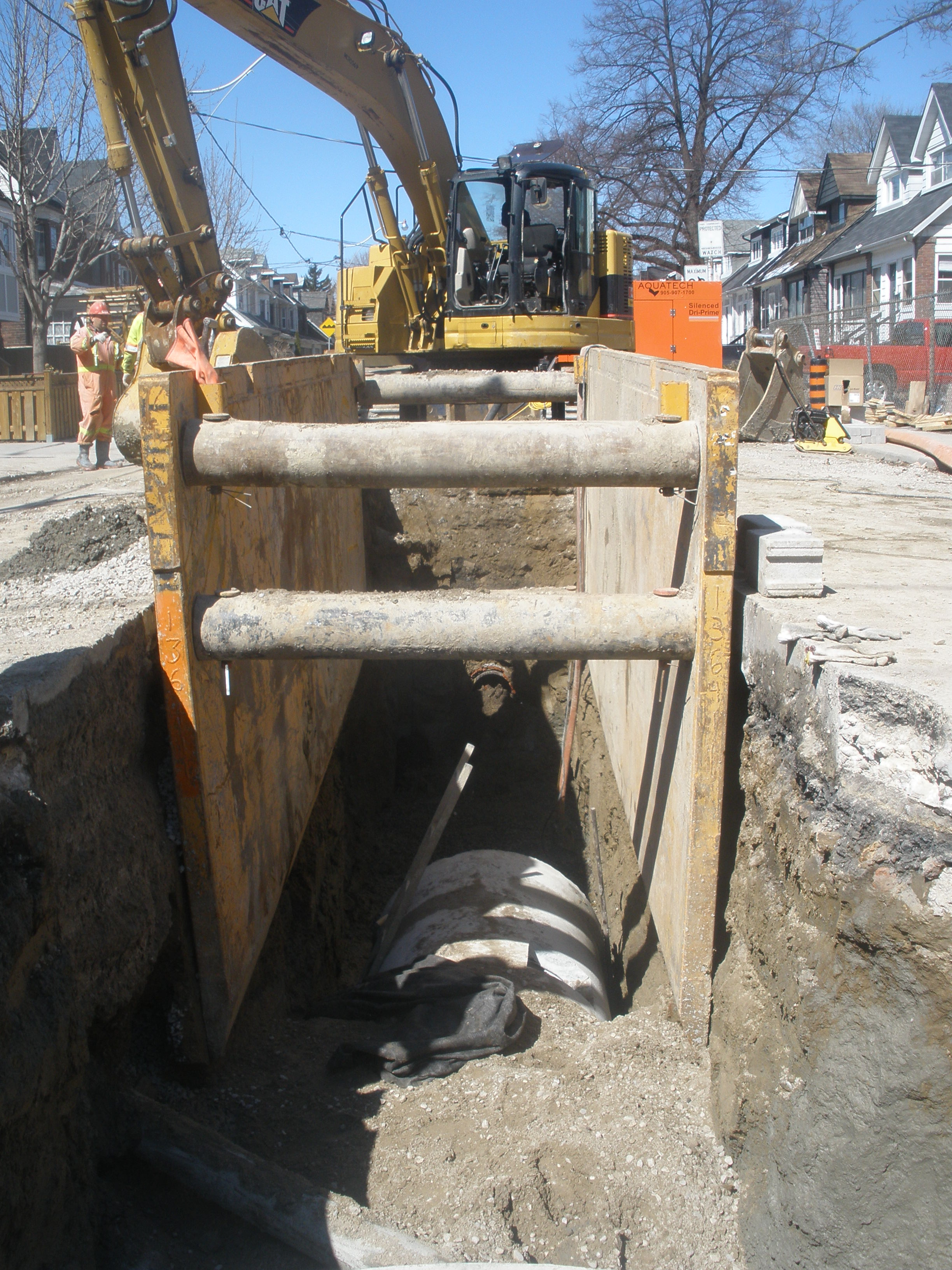
Sewer trench with device to protect workers from failure of the sidewalls

Confined spaces also present a work hazard. The National Institute for Occupational Safety and Health (NIOSH) defines "confined space" as having limited openings for entry and exit and unfavorable natural ventilation, and which is not intended for continuous employee occupancy. Spaces of this kind can include storage tanks, ship compartments, sewers, and pipelines. Confined spaces can pose a hazard not just to workers, but also to people who try to rescue them. In 2015, around 136 U.S. workers died in fatalities related to confined spaces according to the data collected in response to the annual Census of Fatal Occupational Injuries (CFOI) program of the Bureau of Labor Statistics. Hazards like entrapment and drowning to asphyxiation and toxic chemical exposure results in the deaths and injuries that occur in these confined spaces. Physical and atmospheric hazards due to confined spaces can be avoided by addressing and recognizing these hazards before entering in the confined spaces to perform work.

== Noise ==
Noise presents a fairly common workplace hazard: occupational hearing loss is the most common work-related injury in the United States, with 22 million workers exposed to hazardous noise levels at work and an estimated $242 million spent annually on worker's compensation for hearing loss disability. Noise is not the only source of occupational hearing loss; exposure to chemicals such as aromatic solvents and metals including lead, arsenic, and mercury can also cause hearing loss. Naturally, noise is more of concern for certain occupations than others; musicians, mine workers, and construction workers are exposed to higher and more constant levels of noise and therefore are at a higher risk of developing hearing loss. Since noise-induced hearing loss, while entirely preventable, is permanent and irreversible, it is vital that companies and their employees are aware of limits and prevention methods available.

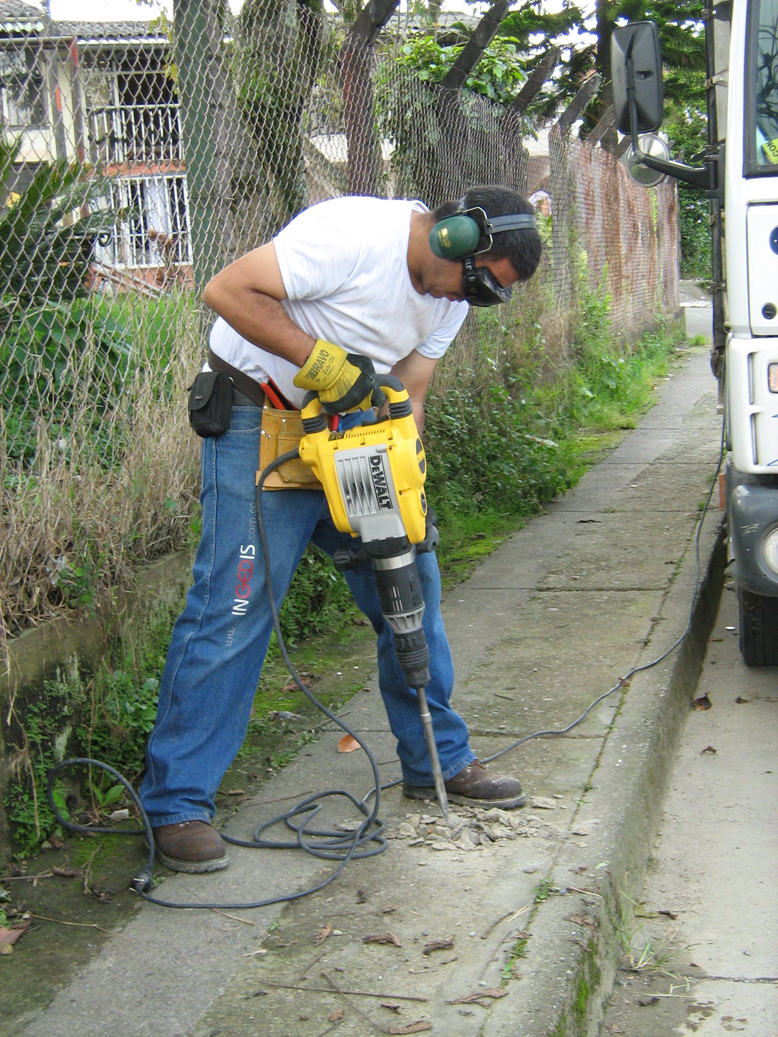
A man wearing ear and eye protection while using a jackhammer

In the United States, noise is recognized as a hazard in the workplace by the National Institute for Occupational Safety and Health (NIOSH) and the Occupational Safety and Health Administration (OSHA). Both organizations work to set and enforce standards for occupational noise exposure and ultimately prevent hearing loss. Examples of initiatives made by NIOSH to prevent the negative effects of noise exposure include the Buy Quiet program, which encourages employers to purchase machinery that produces lower noise levels, and the Safe-In-Sound Award, which was created to recognize organizations that excel in noise control.

== Temperature ==
Temperature extremes can cause a danger to workers.

=== Cold stress ===
Overexposure to freezing conditions or extreme cold can result in a risk to many workers. Employees who work outdoors in the winter months such as fishers, hunters, divers, hydro and telecommunications linemen, construction workers, transportation workers, military personnel, emergency response workers, and those work in the refrigerated warehouse are especially vulnerable to cold. Effects of extreme cold working conditions include:

- Nonfreezing injuries – chilblains, trench foot
- Freezing injuries – frostbite and frostnip
- Hypothermia
- Lower work efficiency
- Higher accident rates
- Impaired performance of complex mental tasks
- Reduced muscular strength and stiffened joints
- Reduced mental alertness
- Impaired manual tasks because of sensitivity and dexterity of fingers

Use of personal protective equipment such as insulating clothes, gloves, boots, and masks, engineering controls such as radiant heaters, and safe work practices are used to minimize the risk of cold injuries.

=== Heat stress ===
Workers who are working in laundries, bakeries, restaurant kitchens, steel foundries, glass factories, brick-firing and ceramic plants, electrical utilities, smelters, and outdoor workers such as construction workers, firefighters, farmers, and mining workers are more vulnerable to exposure to extreme heat. Effects of heat stress include:

- Increased irritability
- Dehydration
- Heat stroke
- Chronic heat exhaustion
- Cramps, rashes, and burns
- Sweaty palms and dizziness
- Increased risk of other accidents
- Loss of concentration and ability to do mental tasks and heavy manual work
- Sleep disturbances, sickness, and susceptibility to minor injuries

Engineering controls such as air conditioning and ventilation, training to build up a level of tolerance to work in extreme heat conditions and use of cooled protective clothing can help to reduce heat-related illnesses.

== Electricity ==
Electricity poses a danger to many workers. Electrical injuries can be divided into four types: fatal electrocution, electric shock, burns, and falls caused by contact with electric energy. Electrocution is one of the major hazards on construction sites. It can be fatal and can result in serious and permanent burn injuries to the skin, internal tissues and damage to the heart depending on the length and severity of the shock. When electric current flows through tissues or bone, it produces heat that causes electrical burns. Electrical burns cause tissue damage and need immediate medical attention. Electric shocks can result in injuries such as muscle spasms, palpitations, nausea, vomiting, collapse, and unconsciousness. Faulty electrical connections and damaged electrical equipment can lead to an electric shock to workers and to others at or near the workplace.

According to the Bureau of Labor Statistics, a total 1,738 accidents occurred due to contact with electric current between 2003 and 2010, and out of that, the highest number of electrical fatalities, 849, occurred in the construction industry. Five occupations from the construction industry—electricians, roofers, painters, carpenters, and construction laborers—account for more than 32% of all electrical fatalities. Improper grounding, wet conditions, damaged tools and equipment, inadequate wiring, exposed electrical parts, overhead power lines and overloaded circuits are the common electrical hazards which are found on construction sites.

Electrical injuries are preventable through safe work practices like keeping electrical tools properly maintained, de-energizing electrical appliances before inspection or repair, and exercising caution when working near energized lines. Personal protective equipment such as hard hats, hoods, sleeves, rubber or insulating gloves and insulating clothing can be useful to reduce any electrical accidents.

== Sunlight ==
Sunlight is the most commonly known physical hazard which affects people who work outside. Outdoor workers get highest sunlight exposure during high-intensity hours between 10:00 a.m. to 4:00 p.m. and during the summertime. The risk of getting sunburned is higher throughout these times. Some commonly used medicines such as nonsteroidal anti-inflammatory drugs (NSAIDs), antihistamines, tetracyclines, thiazides, sulfa antibiotics, and diuretics increase sensitivity to sunlight and result in skin rashes and sunburn. Moreover, sunlight is a source of ultraviolet (UV) rays which are a form of non-ionizing radiation. UV rays directly from sunlight and indirect sun exposure, such as light reflected by snow and light-shaded sand can penetrate workers' uncovered skin. Long time, continuous exposure to ultraviolet radiation results in suppression of the immune system, eye damage, skin aging, and skin cancer. Some non-solar sources of UV radiation, for example, projection lamps, the curing of paints and inks, germicidal lamps used in hospitals, fluorescent tubes, sunlamps, and welding arcs, can also cause adverse health effects in other workers.

Personal protective equipment, engineering, and administrative controls such as the provision of shade cover, and rotating job shifts can minimize the risk of sun exposure for outdoor workers. In case of non-solar sources of UV radiation, suitable engineering controls and administrative controls such as safety signs and training of employees can be useful.

== Vibration ==
Vibration has long been recognized as a serious occupational hazard. Continuously repeated exposure to high levels of vibration results in injuries or illnesses. Vibration exposure is classified into two general types: hand-arm and whole-body vibration. Hand arm vibration causes direct injury to the fingers and hand and affects feeling, dexterity, and grip of the hand. It is a known causative factor for other ergonomic-related fatalities. Hand-arm vibration injury associated with use of appliances or equipment with vibration such as grinders, impact drills, chipping hammers, pavement breakers, dental tools, sanders, air-powered wrenches, and saws of all types. Repeated long time use of vibrating machinery results in long-term effects—independent vascular, neurosensory and musculoskeletal disorders of the hand and arm which is known as hand-arm vibration syndrome (HAVS). Whole-body vibration is one of the most common causes of lost time and production output and causes low back pain and injury due to higher than expected levels of vibration. Whole-body vibration injuries associated with off-road vehicles in industries such as agriculture, forestry, mining, quarrying and with small-fast boats used off-shore.

A combination of control measures such as redesigning the appliances to reduce vibration exposure, using machines that are designed to decrease the vibration transmitted to the operator, implementing speed limits, scheduling regular work breaks, posture changes or job rotation to reduce exposure time, providing training, information and supervision on adjusting and operating equipment can be used for successful vibration exposure reduction.

== Other hazards ==
Lighting, and air pressure (high or low) can also cause work-related illness and injury. Asphyxiation is a potential work hazard in certain situations. Musculoskeletal disorders are avoided by the employment of good ergonomic design and the reduction of repeated strenuous movements or lifts. Ionizing (alpha, beta, gamma, X-ray, neutron), and non-ionizing radiation (microwave, intense infrared, radio frequency, ultraviolet, laser at visible and non-visible wavelengths), can also be a potent hazard.

== See also ==
- Occupational Safety and Health Administration – United States federal regulatory agency
- Occupational hazard – Hazard experienced in the workplaces
- Occupational injury – Bodily damage resulting from working
- Occupational disease – Any chronic disorder that occurs as a result of work or occupational activity
