= Robert Williams =

Robert, Rob, Robbie, Bob or Bobby Williams may refer to:

== Architecture ==
- Robert Edmund Williams (1874–1960), Canadian-American architect
- Robert Williams (architect) (1848–1918), Welsh architect and social campaigner

== Arts ==
=== Film ===
- R. J. Williams (born 1978), American former child actor and later internet entrepreneur
- Rob Williams (filmmaker), American film director
- Robert B. Williams (actor) (1904–1978), American film actor
- Robert Guillaume (1927–2017), American film actor whose birth name is Robert Williams
- Robert Williams (actor, born 1894) (1894–1931), American stage and film actor

=== Music ===
- Bob Williams (singer) (1918–2003), American singer and one of the Williams Brothers
- Chocolate Williams (Robert Williams Jr., 1916–1984), American jazz bassist and blues vocalist
- Meek Mill (Robert Rihmeek Williams, born 1987), American rapper
- Rob Williams (1979–2009), partner of business Dolphin Music
- Robbie Williams (born 1974), British pop singer and former member of Take That
- Robert Pete Williams (1914–1980), American blues guitarist
- Robert S. Williams (born 1949), American bassoon player of the Detroit Symphony Orchestra
- Robert Williams (drummer) (born 1955), American drummer with Captain Beefheart, Hugh Cornwell, and solo
- Robert Williams (singer) (1949–2022), Greek singer and composer

=== Writing ===
- Rob Williams (comics), British comic writer
- Robert Moore Williams (1907–1977), American science fiction novelist
- Robert Williams (artist) (born 1943), American cartoonist and painter
- Robert Williams (poet) (1744–1815), Welsh poet
- Robert Williams (Robert ap Gwilym Ddu) (1767–1850), Welsh-language poet
- Robert Williams (Trebor Mai) (1830–1877), Welsh-language poet
- Robert Folkestone Williams (1809–1870), English novelist, poet, journalist and professor
- Tad Williams (Robert Williams, born 1957), American fantasy and science fiction writer

== Killings ==
- Robert E. Williams (murderer) (1936–1997), American murderer executed in Nebraska
- Robert W. Williams (murderer) (1952–1983), American murderer executed in Louisiana
- Robert Williams (robot fatality) (1953–1979), the first person to be killed by a robot

== Military ==
- Robert B. Williams (general) (1901–1977), World War II major general in the US Army Air Forces
- Robert H. Williams (soldier) (1908–1983), American Marine brigadier general
- Robert Williams (adjutant general) (1829–1901), American brigadier general and Adjutant General of the US Army
- Robert Williams (Medal of Honor) (1837–unknown), American sailor and Medal of Honor recipient
- Robert Williams (Royal Navy officer) (1765–1827) English rear-admiral in the Royal Navy

== Politics ==
=== Australia ===
- Robbie Williams (politician) (1962–2007), Australian politician
- Robert Williams (Victorian politician) (1870–1938), Australian politician
- Robert Wynn Williams (1864–1929), member of the Queensland Legislative Assembly

=== UK ===
- Robert Williams (1735–1814), MP for Dorchester, 1807–1812
- Robert Williams (1767–1847), MP for Dorchester, 1812–1835
- Robert Williams (1811–1890), MP for Dorchester, 1835–1841
- Robert Williams (died 1763) (1695–1763), MP for Montgomeryshire, 1740–1741 and 1742–1747
- Sir Robert Williams, 1st Baronet, of Bridehead (1848–1943), Conservative MP for West Dorset, 1895–1922
- Sir Robert Williams, 2nd Baronet (c. 1627–1678), MP for Carnarvonshire, 1656–1658, and for Carnarvon Boroughs, 1659
- Sir Robert Williams, 9th Baronet (1764–1830) of Penryn, MP for Carnarvonshire, 1790–1826, and for Beaumaris, 1826–1831

=== US ===
- Bob Williams (Washington politician) (1942–2022), member of the Washington House of Representatives
- Bob Williams (West Virginia politician) (born 1951), American politician and state senator
- Robert Williams (Florida politician), state legislator and headed Florida Board of Archives and History
- Robert F. Williams (1925–1996), American political and civil rights activist
- Robert L. Williams (1868–1948), American politician, governor of Oklahoma
- Robert P. Williams (1841–1910), state treasurer of Missouri, 1901–1905
- Robert Q. Williams (born 1964), member of the South Carolina House of Representatives
- Robert R. Williams (philosopher) (1939–2018), American philosopher
- Robert R. Williams (politician) (died 1966), mayor of Miami, 1937–1939
- Robert Williams (Mississippi politician) (1773–1836), governor of the Mississippi Territory
- Robert Williams (Virginia politician) (c. 1740–c. 1793), American lawyer, patriot, planter and politician

=== Other uses in politics ===
- Robert Arthur Williams (1933–2024), consultant and political figure in British Columbia, Canada

== Religion ==
- Robert Dewi Williams (1870–1955), Welsh schoolteacher, Presbyterian minister, and author
- Robert Williams (American priest) (1955–1992), first openly gay male priest in the American Episcopal Church
- Robert Williams (antiquary) (1810–1881), Welsh Anglican clergyman and Celtic scholar
- Robert Williams (archdeacon of Carmarthen) (1863–1938), Welsh historian and Anglican priest
- Robert Williams (archdeacon of Gower) (born 1951), Welsh Anglican priest

== Science ==
- Bobby G. Williams (born 1951), Jet Propulsion Laboratory engineer; namesake of asteroid 5642 Bobbywilliams
- Robert H. Williams (physicist), environmental scientist at the Princeton Environmental Institute
- Robert Hardin Williams (1909–1979), American endocrinologist and diabetologist
- Robert R. Williams (1886–1965), American chemist who first synthesized vitamin B_{1}
- Robert Statham Williams (1859–1945), American bryologist
- Robert Williams (astronomer) (born 1940), director of STScI 1993–98; president of IAU, 2009–2012
- Robert Williams (English chemist) (1926–2015), professor of Oxford University
- Robert Williams (geometer) (born 1942), American designer, mathematician, and architect
- Robert Williams (pathologist) (1916–2003), Welsh pathologist
- Robert Williams (physician, died 1845) (1787?– 1845), English physician
- Robert Williams (psychologist) (1930–2020), president of the Association of Black Psychologists
- Robin Williams (mathematician) (1919–2013), New Zealand mathematician, university administrator and civil servant
- Robin Williams (physicist) (Robert Hughes Williams, born 1941), Welsh physicist and academic
- Sir Robert Williams, 1st Baronet, of Park (1860–1938), Scottish mining engineer, explorer, and railway developer
- Robert W. Williams (professor), American professor of genetics, genomics and informatics

== Sports ==
=== American football ===
- Bob Williams (1950s American football coach), at Livingston State Teachers College, now University of West Alabama, 1952
- Bob Williams (coach, born 1877) (1877–1957), American college football coach
- Bob Williams (quarterback) (1930–2016), football player for Notre Dame
- Bobbie Williams (born 1976), guard
- Bobby Williams (born 1958), tight end, coach
- Bobby Williams (defensive back) (1942–2012), American pro football player, St. Louis Cardinals and the Detroit Lions
- Robert Williams (defensive back, born 1962), former American football cornerback
- Robert Williams (defensive back, born 1977), former American football cornerback
- Robert Williams (quarterback) (c. 1938–1990), football player for Notre Dame, 1956–1958

=== Baseball ===
- Bob Williams (baseball) (1884–1962), baseball player for the New York Highlanders/Yankees
- Bobby Williams (baseball) (1895–1978), American baseball shortstop and manager in the Negro leagues
- Robert Williams (baseball) (1917–2000), American baseball pitcher and infielder in the Negro leagues
- Robert Fulton Williams (1917–1999), American baseball pitcher

=== Basketball ===
- Bob Williams (basketball, born 1931) (1931–2021), American basketball player, played collegiately at Florida A&M
- Bob Williams (basketball, born 1953), American basketball coach, most recently with UC Santa Barbara
- Rob Williams (basketball) (1961–2014), American basketball player, played collegiately for Houston
- Robert Williams (Grambling State basketball), American college basketball player for Grambling State
- Robert Williams III (born 1997), American basketball player for the Portland Trail Blazers, played collegiately for Texas A&M

=== Cricket ===
- Robbie Williams (cricketer) (born 1987), English cricketer for Middlesex
- Robert Williams (English cricketer) (born 1970), English former cricketer
- Robert Williams (South African cricketer) (1912–1984)

=== Football and rugby ===
- Bobbie Williams (rugby union) (1865–1967), Welsh international rugby union player
- Bobby Williams (Scottish footballer) (died 1916)
- Bob Williams (rugby) (1886–1969), Australian rugby league footballer
- Bob Williams (Australian rules footballer) (1913–2004), Australian rules footballer with Hawthorn
- Bobby Williams (footballer, born 1932), English footballer for Chester City
- Bobby Williams (footballer, born 1940), English footballer
- Robbie Williams (footballer, born 1979), English footballer for Warrington Town
- Robbie Williams (footballer, born 1984), English footballer for Limerick
- Robert Williams (footballer, born 1927), English footballer for Wrexham and Shrewsbury Town
- Robert Williams (footballer, born 1932) (1932–2003), English footballer for Mansfield Town

=== Other sports ===
- Bob Williams (pole vaulter), American pole vaulter, 1965 All-American for the Maryland Terrapins track and field team
- Bob Williams (rower) (1931–2017), Canadian rower
- Rob Williams (rower, born 1960), British rower
- Rob Williams (rower, born 1985), British Olympian
- Robbie Williams (snooker player) (born 1986), English snooker player
- Robert Williams (archer) (1841–1914), American archer
- Robert Rhyne Williams (born 1991), American tennis player

== Other ==
- Robert A. Williams Jr. (born 1955), American lawyer and professor
- Robert C. Williams, the namesake of the Robert C. Williams Museum of Papermaking
- Robert S. C. Williams, community service worker in Ontario, Canada
- R. Sanders Williams (born 1948), American academic
- Robert Williams (trade union leader) (1881–1936), British trade union organizer
- Vila Robert Williams, former name of Caála, Angola

== See also ==
- 5642 Bobbywilliams, Mars-crossing asteroid
- Bert Williams (disambiguation)
- Robin Williams (disambiguation)
- William Roberts (disambiguation)
- Williams (surname)
