= Robert W. Williams =

Robert W. Williams may refer to:

- Robert W. Williams (murderer)
- Robert W. Williams (professor)

== See also ==
- Robert Williams (disambiguation)
