= William Roberts =

William, Will or Bill Roberts may refer to:

== Entertainment ==
- William Roberts (biographer) (1767–1849), English barrister and legal writer
- William Harris Lloyd Roberts (1884–1955), Canadian writer, poet, and playwright
- William Roberts (painter) (1895–1980), British painter and war artist
- Will Roberts (1907–2000), British painter
- William Roberts (screenwriter) (1913–1997), American screenwriter
- Billy Roberts (1936–2017), American songwriter and musician
- William Owen Roberts (born 1960), Welsh language novelist and playwright
- Rick Ross (born 1976), American rapper, born William Leonard Roberts II
- Will Roberts (fiction), fictional character in the TV soap opera Days of Our Lives

== Politics ==
- William Roberts (Parliamentarian) (1605–1662), British MP and father of Sir William Roberts, 1st Baronet
- William Roberts (Australian politician) (1821–1900), New South Wales politician
- William R. Roberts (1830–1897), U.S. representative from New York
- W. F. Roberts (William Francis Roberts, 1869–1938), Canadian politician and minister of health, New Brunswick
- William Roberts (Alberta politician) (born 1954), Canadian politician, Alberta, 1986–1993
- William Y. Roberts, state representative in Pennsylvania
- Bill Roberts (Alabama politician) (born 1946), member of the Alabama House of Representatives
- William E. Roberts (1926–2025), member of the New Hampshire House of Representatives

== Religion ==
- William Roberts (priest) (16th century), Welsh priest
- William Roberts (bishop of Bangor) (1585–1665), Anglican bishop
- William C. Roberts (pastor) (1832–1903), American pastor and academic administrator
- William Page Roberts (1836–1928), Church of England clergyman, dean of Salisbury, 1907–1919
- William Henry Roberts (1847–1919), American Baptist missionary in Burma
- William P. Roberts (bishop) (fl. 1909–1950), American Episcopal bishop of Shanghai
- William A. Roberts (born 1946), chief of the staff of the Salvation Army

== Sports ==
=== American football ===
- William Roberts (American football) (born 1962), former NFL offensive lineman
- Bill Roberts (American football) (1929–2007), American football player
- Willie Roberts (American football, born 1931) (William S. Roberts, 1931–2015)

=== Association football ===
- William Roberts (footballer, born 1859) (1859–?), Llangollen F.C., Berwyn Rangers F.C. and Wales international footballer
- Bill Roberts (footballer, born 1859) (1859–1945), Wrexham A.F.C. and Wales international footballer
- William Roberts (footballer, born 1863) (1863–?), Rhyl F.C. and Wales international footballer
- Billy Roberts (footballer, born 1880) (1880–?), English footballer
- William Roberts (footballer, born 1907) (1907–?), Cardiff City F.C. footballer
- Bill Roberts (footballer, born 1908) (1908–1976), Welsh footballer
- Bill Roberts (footballer, born 1918), (1918–1994), Welsh footballer, see List of Rochdale A.F.C. players (25–99 appearances)
- Will Roberts (footballer) (born 1994), Welsh footballer

=== Australian rules football ===
- Bill Roberts (footballer, born 1897) (1897–1960), Australian rules footballer for South Melbourne
- Billy Roberts (Australian footballer) (1908–1998), Australian rules footballer for St Kilda
- Bill Roberts (footballer, born 1910) (1910–1973), Australian rules footballer for Essendon

=== Cricket ===
- William Roberts (MCC cricketer) (1795–1843), English cricketer
- William Roberts (Australian cricketer), Australian cricketer, played in the 1880s
- William Roberts (Lancashire cricketer) (1914–1951), English cricketer

=== Rugby union ===
- William Roberts (rugby union) (1871–1937), New Zealand rugby union player
- Bill Roberts (rugby union) (1906–1965), Welsh rugby international

=== Other sports ===
- William Roberts (athlete) (1912–2001), British runner, gold medal winner in 4 × 100 m relay at the 1936 Olympics
- Bill Roberts (basketball) (1925–2016), American basketball player
- William Roberts (cyclist) (born 1998), British and Welsh cyclist

== Other ==
- Sir William Roberts, 1st Baronet (1638–1688), British landowner
- William Hayward Roberts (baptised 1734–died 1791), English schoolmaster and poet
- William Prowting Roberts (1806–1871), Chartist who became known as "attorney-general" of the coal miners in the 1840s
- William Milnor Roberts (1810–1881), American civil engineer
- William Roberts (physician) (1830–1899), British scientist
- William Paul Roberts (1841–1910), brigadier general in the Confederate Army
- William Roberts (engineer) (1848–1918), engineer in chief of the Highland Railway
- Bill Roberts (businessman) (1898–1962), British founder of the JET brand of petrol
- William Roberts (veteran) (1900–2006), British veteran of the First World War
- William C. Roberts (1932–2023), cardiovascular physician and pathologist
- William Clare Roberts, Canadian political theorist
- William Roberts & Co of Nelson, English steam engine manufacturer
- Sir William Roberts (agriculturist) (1884–1971), Welsh agricultural scientist, academic, and businessman

== See also ==
- Robert Williams (disambiguation)
- Billy Roberts (disambiguation)
