= Workplace robotics safety =

Aspect of occupational safety

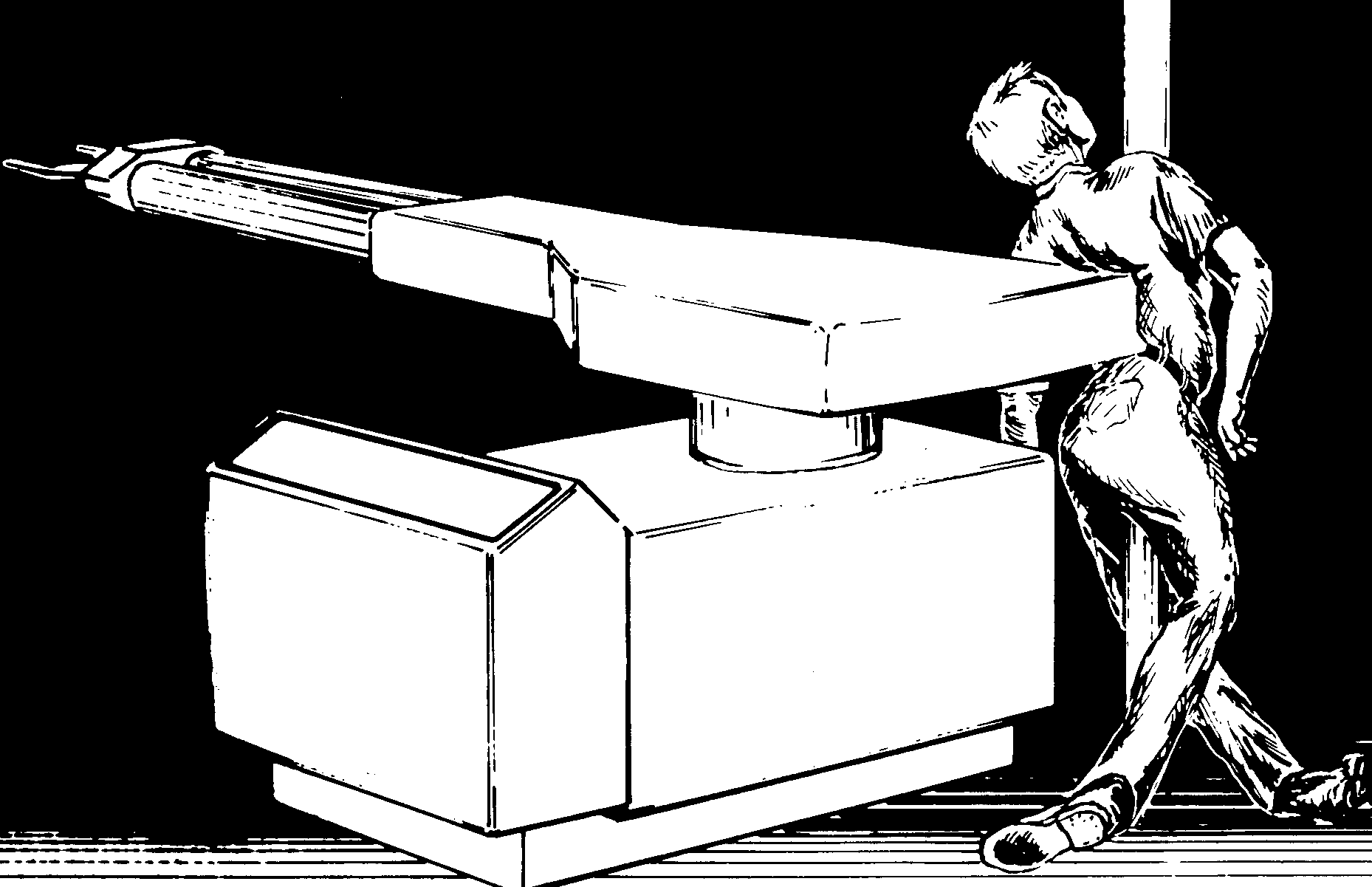
An artist's representation of an industrial robot accident that occurred in 1984

Workplace robotics safety is an aspect of occupational safety and health when robots are used in the workplace. This includes traditional industrial robots as well as emerging technologies such as drone aircraft and wearable robotic exoskeletons. Types of accidents include collisions, crushing, and injuries from mechanical parts. Hazard controls include physical barriers, good work practices, and proper maintenance.

== Background ==
Many workplace robots are industrial robots used in manufacturing. According to the International Federation of Robotics, 1.7 million new robots are expected to be used in factories between 2017 and 2020. Emerging robot technologies include collaborative robots, personal care robots, construction robots, exoskeletons, autonomous vehicles, and drone aircraft (also known as unmanned aerial vehicles or UAVs).

Advances in automation technologies (e.g. fixed robots, collaborative and mobile robots, and exoskeletons) have the potential to improve work conditions but also to introduce workplace hazards in manufacturing workplaces. Fifty-six percent of robot injuries are classified as pinch injuries and 44% of injuries are classified as impact injuries. A 1987 study found that line workers are at the greatest risk, followed by maintenance workers, and programmers. Poor workplace design and human error caused most injuries. Despite the lack of occupational surveillance data on injuries associated specifically with robots, researchers from the US National Institute for Occupational Safety and Health (NIOSH) identified 61 robot-related deaths between 1992 and 2015 using keyword searches of the Bureau of Labor Statistics (BLS) Census of Fatal Occupational Injuries research database (see info from Center for Occupational Robotics Research). Using data from the Bureau of Labor Statistics, NIOSH and its state partners have investigated 4 robot-related fatalities under the Fatality Assessment and Control Evaluation Program. In addition the Occupational Safety and Health Administration (OSHA) has investigated robot-related deaths and injuries, which can be reviewed at OSHA Accident Search page. Injuries and fatalities could increase over time because of the increasing number of collaborative and co-existing robots, powered exoskeletons, and autonomous vehicles into the work environment.

Safety standards are being developed by the Robotic Industries Association (RIA) in conjunction with the American National Standards Institute (ANSI). On 5 October 2017, OSHA, NIOSH and RIA signed an alliance to work together to enhance technical expertise, identify and help address potential workplace hazards associated with traditional industrial robots and the emerging technology of human-robot collaboration installations and systems, and help identify needed research to reduce workplace hazards. On 16 October NIOSH launched the Center for Occupational Robotics Research to "provide scientific leadership to guide the development and use of occupational robots that enhance worker safety, health, and well being". So far, the research needs identified by NIOSH and its partners include: tracking and preventing injuries and fatalities, intervention and dissemination strategies to promote safe machine control and maintenance procedures, and on translating effective evidence-based interventions into workplace practice.

== Hazards ==
Warning sign: Industrial robot

Many hazards and injuries can result from the use of robots in the workplace. Some robots, notably those in a traditional industrial environment, are fast and powerful. This increases the potential for injury as one swing from a robotic arm, for example, could cause serious bodily harm. There are additional risks when a robot malfunctions or is in need of maintenance. A worker who is working on the robot may be injured because a malfunctioning robot is typically unpredictable. For example, a robotic arm that is part of a car assembly line may experience a jammed motor. A worker who is working to fix the jam may suddenly get hit by the arm the moment it becomes unjammed. Additionally, if a worker is standing in a zone that is overlapping with nearby robotic arms, he or she may get injured by other moving equipment.

There are four types of accidents that can occur with robots: impact or collision accidents, crushing and trapping accidents, mechanical part accidents, and other accidents. Impact or collision accidents occur generally from malfunctions and unpredicted changes. Crushing and trapping accidents occur when a part of a worker's body becomes trapped or caught on robotic equipment. Mechanical part accidents can occur when a robot malfunctions and starts to "break down", where the ejection of parts or exposed wire can cause serious injury. Other accidents at just general accidents that occur from working with robots.

There are seven sources of hazards that are associated with human interaction with robots and machines: human errors, control errors, unauthorized access, mechanical failures, environmental sources, power systems, and improper installation. Human errors could be anything from one line of incorrect code to a loose bolt on a robotic arm. Many hazards can stem from human-based error. Control errors are intrinsic and are usually not controllable nor predictable. Unauthorized access hazards occur when a person who is not familiar with the area enters the domain of a robot. Mechanical failures can happen at any time, and a faulty unit is usually unpredictable. Environmental sources are things such as electromagnetic or radio interference in the environment that can cause a robot to malfunction. Power systems are pneumatic, hydraulic, or electrical power sources; these power sources can malfunction and cause fires, leaks, or electrical shocks. Improper installation is fairly self-explanatory; a loose bolt or an exposed wire can lead to inherent hazards.

=== Emerging technologies ===
Emerging robotic technologies can reduce hazards to workers, but can also introduce new hazards. For example, robotic exoskeletons can be used in construction to reduce load to the spine, improve posture, and reduce fatigue; however, they can also increase chest pressure, limit mobility when moving out of the way of a falling object, and cause balance problems. Unmanned aerial vehicles are being used in the construction industry to do monitoring and inspections of buildings under construction. This reduces the need for humans to be in hazardous locations, but the risk of a UAV collision presents a hazard to workers. For collaborative robots, isolation is not possible. Possible hazard controls include collision avoidance systems, and making the robot less stiff to lessen the impact force. Robotic tech vest is a wearable device for humans, worn in Amazon warehouses.

== Hazard controls ==
There are a few ways to prevent injuries by implementing hazard controls. There can be risk assessments at each of the various stages of a robot's development. Risk assessments can help gather information about a robot's status, how well it is being maintained, and if repairs are needed soon. By being aware of the status of a robot, injuries can be prevented and hazards reduced.

Safeguarding devices can be implemented to reduce the risk of injuries. These can include engineering controls such as physical barriers, guard rails, presence-sensing safeguarding devices, etc. Awareness devices are usually used in conjunction with safeguarding devices. They are usually a system of rope or chain barriers with lights, signs, whistles, and horns. Their purpose it to be able to alert workers or personnel of certain dangers.

Operator safeguards can also be in place. These usually utilize safeguarding devices to protect the operator and reduce risk of injury. Additionally, when an operator is within close proximity of a robot, the working speed of the robot can be reduced to ensure that the operator is in full control. This can be done by placing the robot in the manual or teach mode. It is also crucial to inform the programmer of the robot of what type of work the robot will be doing, how it will interact with other robots, and how it will work in relation to an operator.

Proper maintenance of robotic equipment is also critical in order to reduce hazards. Maintaining a robot ensures that it continues to function properly, thereby reducing the risks associated with a malfunction.

One common safeguard used in industrial settings is the installation of robot safety fencing. These barriers, often made from durable materials such as mesh or polycarbonate, prevent accidental interactions between workers and robotic systems, reducing the risk of injury. Robot safety fencing is particularly important in environments where high-speed or powerful robots are used.

== Regulations ==
Some existing regulations regarding robots and robotic systems include:

- ANSI/RIA R15.06
- OSHA 29 CFR 1910.333
- OSHA 29 CFR 1910.147
- ISO 10218
- ISO/TS 15066
- ISO/DIS 13482
