= Billy Roberts (disambiguation) =

Billy Roberts (1936–2017) was an American songwriter and musician.

Billy Roberts may also refer to:

- Billy Roberts (footballer, born 1880), John William Roberts, footballer
- Billy Roberts (Australian footballer) (1908–1998), Australian rules footballer

== See also ==
- William Roberts (disambiguation)
