= Robin Williams (disambiguation) =

Robin Williams (1951–2014) was an American actor and stand-up comedian.

Robin Williams may also refer to:

== People ==
- Robin Williams (golfer) (born 2001), English-South African professional golfer
- Robin Murphy Williams (1914–2006), American sociology professor at Cornell University
- Robin Williams (academic) (born 1952), British professor at University of Edinburgh
- Robin Williams (canoeist), British slalom canoeist
- Robin Williams (rowing coach) (born 1959), British rowing coach
- Robin Williams (folk musician) (born 1947), American folk musician
- Robin Williams (physicist) (born 1941), Welsh physicist and academic
- Robin Williams (writer) (born 1953), computers and graphic design
- Robin Williams (mathematician) (1919–2013), New Zealand mathematician, university administrator and public servant
- Robin L. Williams (born 1961), member of the Georgia House of Representatives
- Robin F. Williams (born 1984), American painter

== Other uses ==
- 12820 Robinwilliams, an asteroid
- "Robin Williams", a song by CeeLo Green from his 2015 album Heart Blanche

== See also ==
- Robyn Williams (born 1944), Australian scientist, journalist and educator
- Robyn Williams (cricketer) (born 1986), Australian cricketer
- Robyn Clay-Williams, one of the first two female Australian military pilots (as Robyn Williams) and an academic
- Robbie Williams (disambiguation)
