= Robotic tech vest =

Wearable safety device

Robotic tech vest (RTV) is a wearable safety device designed to protect workers operating near industrial robots. It functions similar to a high-visibility jacket, but it communicates wirelessly with robotic systems to create a safety zone around the wearer. Robots can sense an RTV from a distance and can slow, stop, or reroute its path to avoid collisions.

== History ==
The Occupational Safety and Health Administration (OSHA) has studied the topic of workers' safety in the areas of operating robots and concluded: "Studies indicate that many robot accidents occur during non-routine operating conditions, such as programming, maintenance, testing, setup, or adjustment. During many of these operations the worker may temporarily be within the robot's working envelope where unintended operations could result in injuries." Before employing RTVs, workers marked out the area where they would be working to enable the robotic route planner to smartly route around that area.

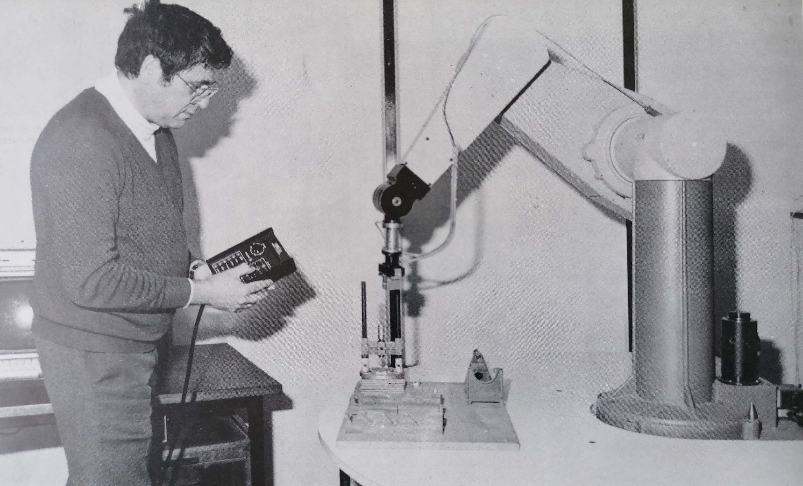
Professor Yoram Koren operates a robotic arm at the Robotics lab in the faculty of Mechanical Engineering Israeli Institute of Technology

== Operation in warehouse ==
In 2018, Amazon introduced robotic tech vests in 25 warehouses to protect workers from robot collisions. This kind of equipment is needed in the warehouse, especially at a company as big as Amazon, which amounts to nearly 750,000 robots that work collaboratively with human employees. The RTV emits radio signals which slow or stop drive units. This allows the drive units to detect a human as an obstacle and reroute accordingly while still maintaining a safe distance. A robotic tech vest is a combo of a belt and suspenders. As according to Amazon in 2019, RTV has been introduced to more than 25 sites and more than 1 million activations were completed. The workers are safe with RTVs when they enter the area to fix a robotic system or retrieve fallen items. Amazon claimed RTVs to be successful in 2019.

== Safety Impact ==
RTVs are intended to reduce collisions between workers and robots, especially during non-routine operations when workers enter active robotic zones. This is the time that most robot accidents in the workplace occur. RTVs provide real-time worker detection without requiring full shutdown of robotic systems, improving productivity while prioritizing worker safety. Although they have proven effective, RTVs are generally considered a secondary safety measure rather than a primary solution. They are most effective when combined with other established safety practices.

== Comparison with collaborative robots ==
The technology of robotic tech vests differs from the collaborative robots (cobots) approach. Collaborative robots are designed with built-in safety features such as force limitation and proximity sensing that allow direct interaction with humans without the need for external devices.

In contrast, RTVs modify the behavior of existing robotic systems externally, meaning there are no fundamental changes to robot hardware required. This makes them suitable for fitting into environments where robots were not originally designed in conjunction with close human proximity.

== See also ==
- Amazon Robotics
- Automatic track warning system
- Kenji Urada
- Robert Williams (robot fatality)
- Workplace robotics safety
