= Sir Robert Williams =

Sir Robert Williams may refer to:

- Sir Robert Williams, 2nd Baronet (c. 1627–1678), MP for Carnarvonshire, 1656–1658, and for Carnarvon Boroughs, 1659
- Sir Robert Williams, 9th Baronet (1764–1830) of Penryn, MP for Carnarvonshire, 1790–1826, and for Beaumaris, 1826–1831
- Sir Robert Williams, 1st Baronet, of Bridehead (1848–1943), Conservative Member of Parliament for West Dorset, 1895–1922
- Sir Robert Williams, 1st Baronet, of Park (1860–1938), Scottish mining engineer, explorer of Africa, and railway developer

== See also ==
- Robert Williams (disambiguation)
