= Automatic track warning system =

Occupational safety device

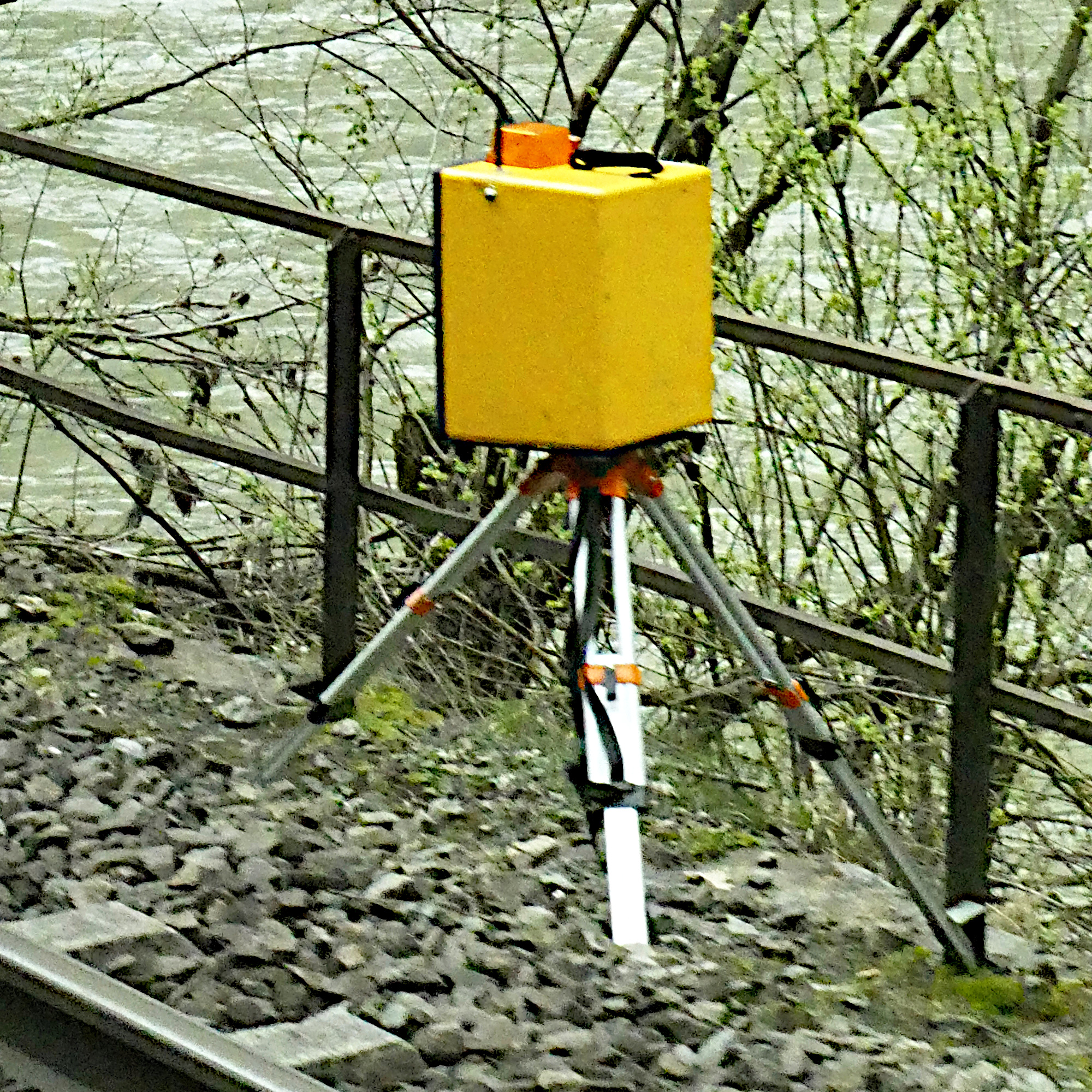
Automatic track warning system on a tripod in Salzburg

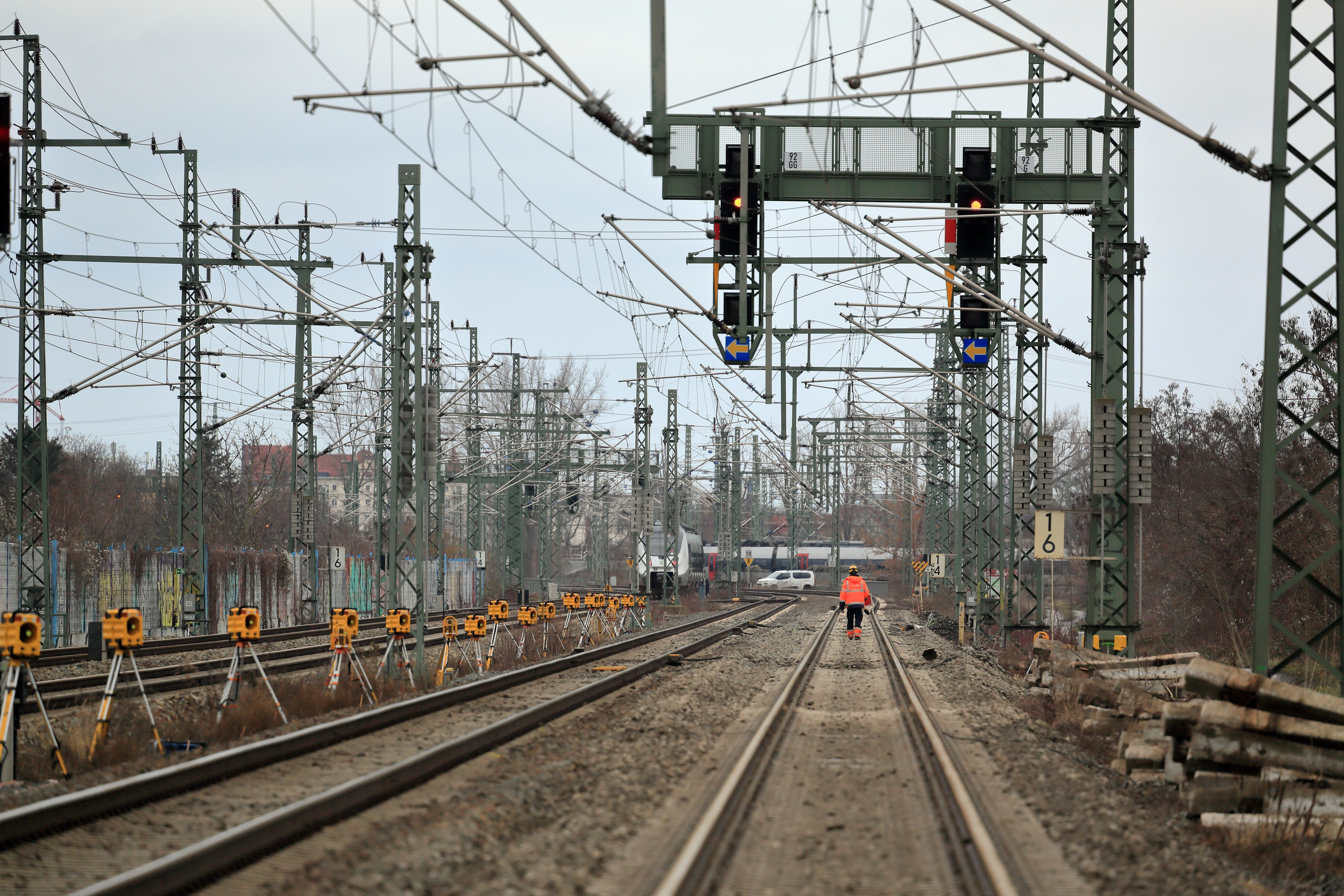
Multiple ATWS near the main train station of Halle (Saale)

Automatic track warning system (ATWS, German: Rottenwarnanlage) is a technical device used during track construction for occupational safety. It warns the construction site workers of an approaching train. In Germany, it usually consists of a series of signal lights and acoustic warning devices, which are mounted on steel poles or tripods at the edge of the track bed every 30 meters. There are wired and wireless systems that are automatically activated when a train approaches, for example by a wheel contact in the track bed. As long as the ATWS is generating warning signals, the construction site personnel must stay away from the track in question and allow the train to pass. ATWS is considered safer than the non-automated solution, where one worker constantly watches for approaching trains and alerts his colleagues.

== Types ==
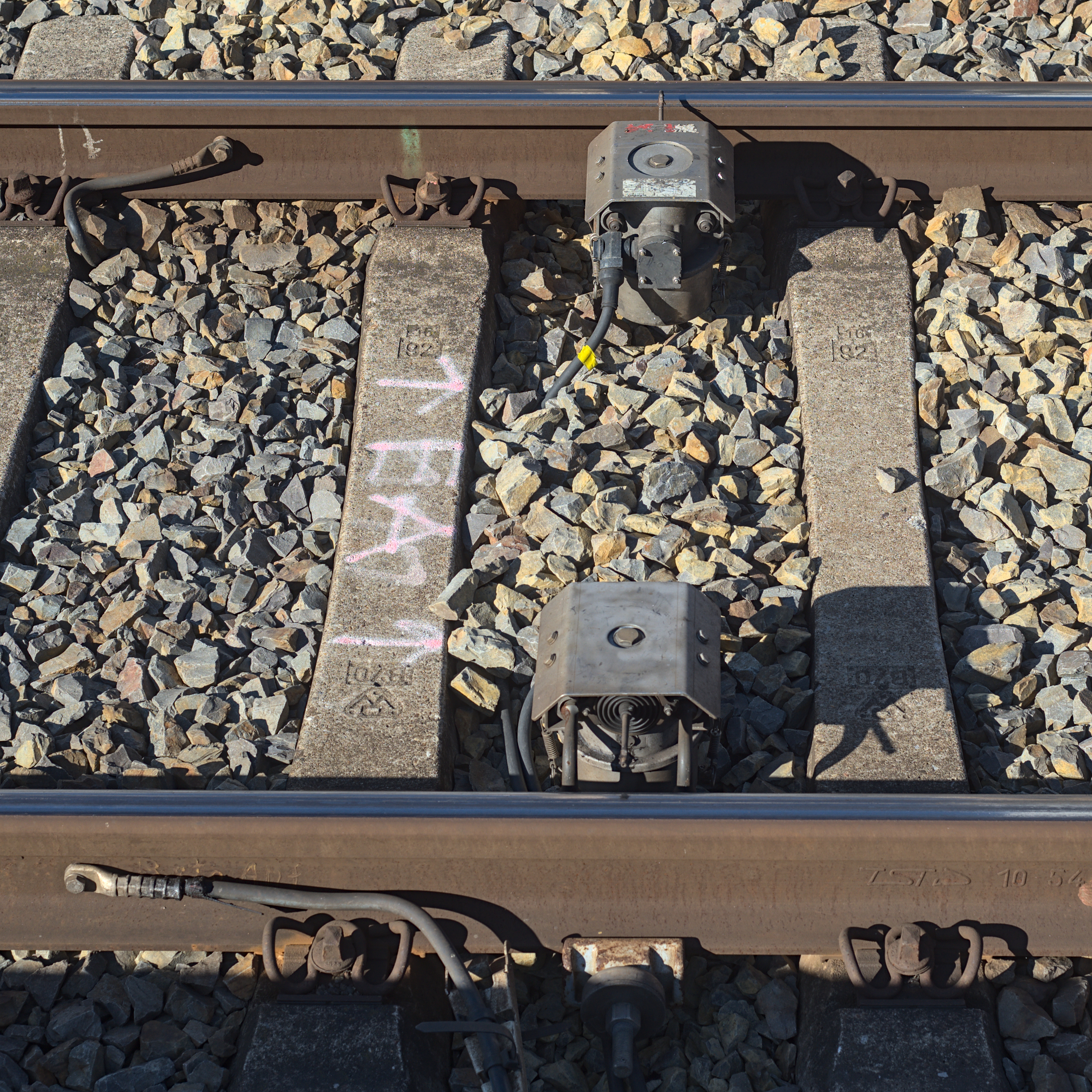
Electromechanical track contacts for automatic activation and deactivation

There are collective ATWS and individual ATWS. The collective ATWS generates an acoustic signal for a group of workers. The individual ATWS is a wearable device warning every worker individually.

=== Acoustic warning signals in Germany ===
Acoustic signals generated by collective ATWS in Germany are defined in the railway signalling regulations:

- A long continuous tone (mixed sound of different high tones) means "Caution! Vehicles are approaching on the neighbouring track"
- Two long tones in succession at different pitches signal "Clear the working track!"
- At least five times two short tones at different pitches signalling "Clear working tracks as quickly as possible!"

After the acoustic signal, the railway workers have 25 seconds to escape from the track.

== Noise pollution controversy for collective ATWS ==
Due to the nature of the system, ATWS is very loud (97 up to 126 dB) so that it can be heard by the track workers to be warned, even in the vicinity of loud working machines and with hearing protection in place. This is a burden for people living near railway tracks during work. Modern systems adapt to the ambient volume (mandatory from 2019) and only warn at full sound pressure in very loud environments. Even at reduced volume, this is still perceived as noise pollution. In 2014 in Stuttgart-Sommerrain, an ATWS was sabotaged by unidentified persons.

== Research on wearable devices for personal warning ==
EU Commission funded the project ALARP (A railway automatic track warning system based on distributed personal mobile terminals) in the years 2010–2013 by the total amount of €3,941,877.20. The aim of the project was to improve the safety of track workers through the development of an innovative ATWS using low-cost, rugged, wireless wearable devices.

== See also ==
- Automatic warning system
- Robotic tech vest
