= ISO 10218 =

International standard for industrial robot safety

ISO 10218 is an international standard for industrial robot safety, developed by ISO/TC 184/SC 2 "Robots and robotic devices" in parallel with the European Committee for Standardization in 2011. It consists of two parts:

- Part 1: Industrial robots
- Part 2: Industrial robot applications and robot cells

As a European standard it has the designation EN ISO 10218-1 and -2 (not to be mixed with EN 10218).

ISO/TS 15066 was published in 2016 to address the new field of safety requirements for cobots.

The 2025 editions consist of two parts and were published in February 2025. Part 1:2025 is the third edition. Part 1:2025 cancels and replaces Part 1:2011. Part 2:2025 is the second edition. ISO/TC 299 "Robotics" maintains the 2025 editions.
