= Kenji Urada =

Second man killed by a robot

- Born: 1943 or 1944
- Died: July 4, 1981 (aged 37); Akashi, Japan
- Occupation: Factory worker
- Known for: First human killed by a robot in Japan

Kenji Urada (c. 1944 – July 4, 1981) was a Japanese factory worker who was killed by a robot. Urada is often incorrectly reported to be the first person killed by a robot, but Robert Williams, a worker at the Ford Motor Company's Michigan Casting Center in the United States, had been killed by a robot over two years earlier, on January 25, 1979.

Urada was a maintenance worker at the Kawasaki Heavy Industries plant in Akashi. He died while checking a malfunctioning robot; after jumping over a safety barrier, which was designed to shut down power to the machine when open, he apparently started the robot inadvertently. The robot, built by Kawasaki under a license from Unimation, pinned him against an adjacent machine and either crushed him or stabbed him in the back. Other workers in the factory were unable to stop the machine as they were unfamiliar with its operation.

International newswire service UPI reported Urada was the first human killed by a robot on December 8, 1981. The circumstances of his death were not made public until after an investigation by the Hyōgo labor standards bureau was completed. The investigation concluded that workers were not sufficiently familiar with the machines and the machines were not sufficiently regulated. The robot that killed Urada was removed from the Akashi plant, and man-high fences were erected around the other two robots in the plant in the wake of the accident.

== See also ==
- List of unusual deaths in the 20th century
