= Robert Williams (Royal Navy officer) =

British naval officer (1765–1827)

- Born: 1765
- Died: 1 March 1827 (aged 61–62) Queen's Square, Bath
- Allegiance: Great Britain; United Kingdom
- Branch: Royal Navy
- Rank: Rear-Admiral of the Blue
- Conflicts: American Revolutionary War; Battle of Ushant; Battle of Cape Henry; Battle of the Saintes; War of the First Coalition; Battle of Martinique; Battle of Cape St. Vincent

Robert Williams (1765–1827) was a rear-admiral in the Royal Navy.

== Life ==
Robert Williams, born in 1765, entered the navy in January 1777 on board the Ardent, then commanded by Lord Mulgrave. Early in 1778 he was moved to the America of 64 guns, with Lord Longford, and in her was present in the action off Ushant on 27 July 1778. In 1780 he went out to North America in the London, flagship of Rear-admiral Thomas Graves (afterwards Lord Graves), and in her was present in the action off the Chesapeake on 16 March 1781. In August he was appointed to the Royal Oak as acting-lieutenant; on 5 September took part in the action off the Chesapeake, and on 12 April 1782 in the action near Dominica. On 12 April 1783 he was promoted to be lieutenant of the Argo, in which he returned to England in 1784.

In 1790 he was with Captain (afterwards Sir Charles) Thompson in the Elephant; in 1793 in the Centurion in the Channel, and in 1794 again with Thompson in the Vengeance in the West Indies. After the capture of Martinique he followed Thompson to the Vanguard. In 1796 he came home in the Minotaur, and was immediately appointed first lieutenant of the Prince George, the flagship of Rear-admiral (Sir William) Parker in the Battle of Cape St. Vincent. For his service on this occasion Williams was promoted to the rank of commander and appointed acting captain of the Blenheim, in which Parker had hoisted his flag. He afterwards commanded the Dolphin storeship, and the San Ysidro as acting-captain. On bringing this ship to England his promotion was confirmed, to date 10 November 1797, and for a few months he was flag-captain to Thompson in the Formidable, but in January 1798 he was put on half-pay.

In 1803 he went out to the East Indies in the Russell. He returned in 1805 in the Ruby, his health having broken down. In 1810–12 he commanded the Dictator in the Baltic with Sir James (Lord de) Saumarez; and from 1812 to 1814 the Gloucester in the North Sea, Baltic, and West Indies. He had no further service, but became a rear-admiral on 9 April 1823, and died at his house in Queen's Square, Bath, on 1 March 1827. His wife predeceased him in 1825.

== Sources ==
- Laughton, J. K.; Lambert, Andrew (2004). "Williams, Robert (1765–1827)". Oxford Dictionary of National Biography (online ed.). Oxford University Press. doi:10.1093/ref:odnb/29539. (Subscription, Wikipedia Library access or UK public library membership required.)
- Marshall, John (1823). "Williams, Robert" . Royal Naval Biography. Vol. 1, part 2. London: Longman and Company. pp. 856–861.
- "Obituary.—Rear Adm. Williams". The Gentleman's Magazine. Vol. 97, Part 1. London: J. B. Nichols, 1827. p. 465.

Attribution:

- This article incorporates text from a publication now in the public domain: Laughton, John Knox (1900). "Williams, Robert (1765-1827)". In Lee, Sidney (ed.). Dictionary of National Biography. Vol. 61. London: Smith, Elder & Co. pp. 439–440.
