= Flat Rock Assembly Plant =

American auto assembly plant in Michigan

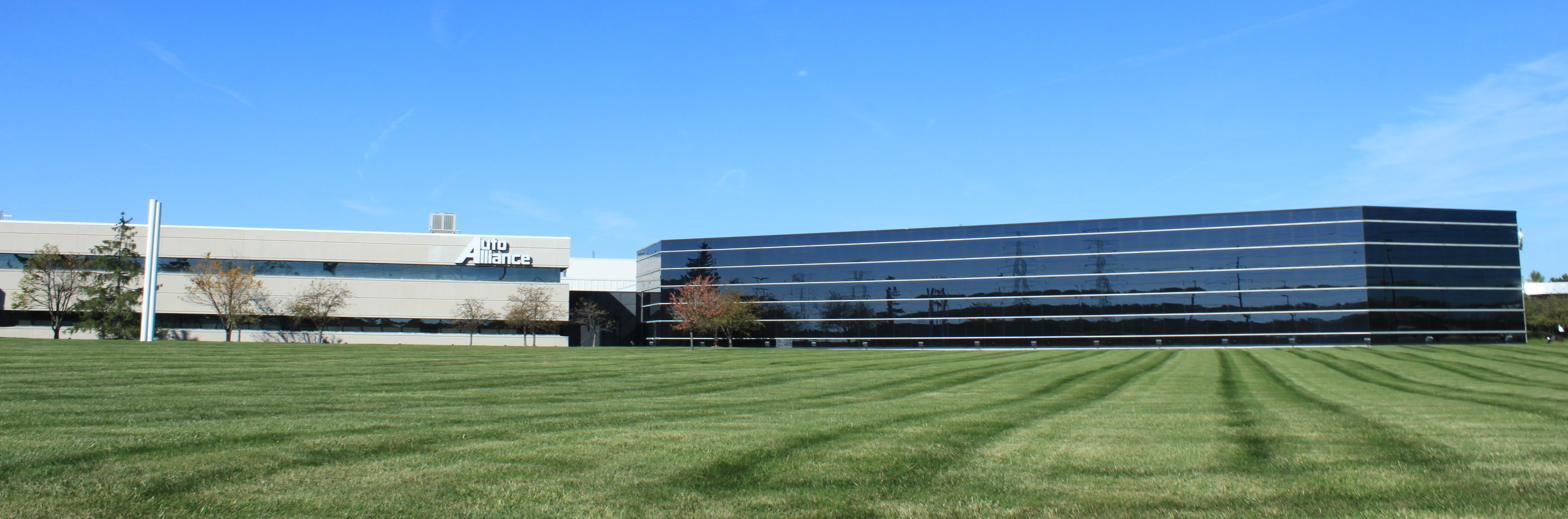
- The plant in 2010
- Former names: Michigan Casting Center (1972–1981); Mazda Motor Manufacturing USA (1987–1992); AutoAlliance International (1992–2012)

General information
- Classification: Factory
- Location: 1 International Drive, Flat Rock, Michigan, United States
- Coordinates: 42°06′25″N 83°14′52″W
- Opened: January 1972
- Owner: Ford Motor Company

The Flat Rock Assembly Plant is a Ford Motor Company automobile assembly plant located at 1 International Drive in Flat Rock, Michigan, United States, within Metro Detroit. The facility covers 2,900,000 square feet (270,000 m²) of production space and employs approximately 3,510 hourly workers and 140 salaried workers. It currently manufactures the Ford Mustang.

The plant was originally built by Ford as the Michigan Casting Center in 1972, but it closed in 1981. In 1987, Mazda took over the site and established its first U.S. manufacturing facility, Mazda Motor Manufacturing USA. In 1992, Ford purchased a stake in the plant, and it was reorganized as the joint venture AutoAlliance International. Mazda ended production there in 2012, after which the facility returned to full Ford ownership.

== History ==
=== Michigan Casting Center (1972–1981) ===
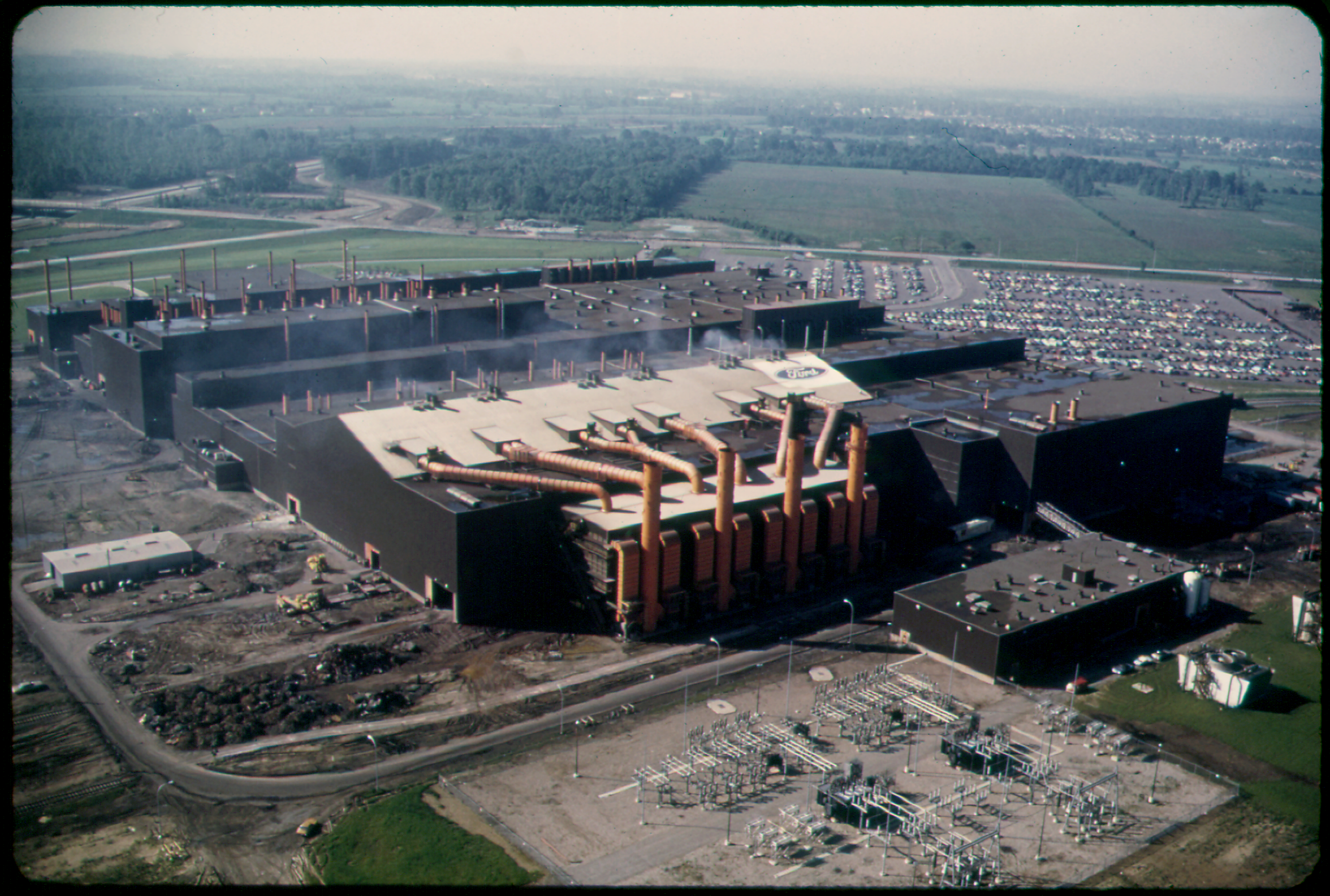
Casting plant, 1973.

The Michigan Casting Center (MCC) opened in January 1972 following three years of construction and Ford's largest single capital investment at the time. It was considered one of the most technologically advanced casting facilities in the world. Despite the investment, the facility was plagued by labor disputes, workplace injuries, and declining demand for the V8 engine blocks it produced. Ford closed the plant in 1981.

On January 25, 1979, a worker, Robert Williams, was killed by an industrial robot arm. He was the first known person to be killed by a robot.

=== Mazda Motor Manufacturing USA (1987–1992) ===
In 1985, Mazda began constructing a new assembly plant on the site of the former MCC. Production at Mazda Motor Manufacturing USA (MMUSA) began in September 1987 with the Mazda MX-6 and Ford Probe coupes. By 1991, the plant employed about 3,600 workers, including 250 Japanese employees.

=== AutoAlliance International (1992–2012) ===
On April 15, 1992, Ford repurchased a 50% stake in the facility, creating a joint venture with Mazda. The plant was renamed AutoAlliance International on July 1, 1992. The factory began producing all U.S. models of the Mazda 626 in 1993. The Mercury Cougar (1998–2002) and the North American Mazda6 (2003–2012) were also assembled there. Ford Mustang production was added in 2005.

During this period, Deepak Ahuja served as Chief Financial Officer of the joint venture.

The last Mazda6 rolled off the line on August 24, 2012, ending Mazda production in the United States and concluding the 20-year joint venture. Mazda shifted Mazda6 production back to its Hofu factory in Japan and opened a new factory in Salamanca, Mexico.

=== Flat Rock Assembly Plant (since 2012) ===
On September 10, 2012, Ford assumed full control of the facility, renaming it the Flat Rock Assembly Plant. The company spent $555 million to retool the plant for production of the 2013 Ford Fusion.

In July 2015, Ford confirmed that the 2017 Lincoln Continental would be built at Flat Rock starting in 2016. In January 2017, Ford announced plans to build an electric SUV by 2020 and an autonomous vehicle for commercial ride-hailing by 2021, both to be produced at the facility.

Declining sales of the Mustang and especially the Continental led Ford to cut the plant’s output from two shifts to one in late 2018. More than 1,000 workers were laid off in early 2019, including nearly 500 temporary employees.

In March 2019, Ford revised its plans, delaying production of a battery-electric vehicle at Flat Rock.

== Products ==
=== Current ===
- Ford Mustang (2005–present)

=== Past ===
- Lincoln Continental (2017–2020)
- Ford Fusion (2013–2016)
- Mazda 6 (2003–2012)
- Mercury Cougar (1999–2002)
- Mazda 626 (1990–2002)
- Ford Probe (1989–1997)
- Mazda MX-6 (1988–1997)
