= Robyn Williams (cricketer) =

Australian cricketer (born 1986)

Personal information
- Born: 31 August 1986 (age 40); Australia
- Batting: Right-handed
- Bowling: Right-arm medium

Domestic team information
- Years: Team
- 2004/05–2006/07: Western Australia

Career statistics
Competition	WLA
Matches	6
Runs scored	8
Batting average	8.00
100s/50s	0/0
Top score	5
Balls bowled	12
Wickets	0
Bowling average	–
5 wickets in innings	–
10 wickets in match	–
Best bowling	–
Catches/stumpings	1/–
- Source: CricketArchive, 29 June 2021

Robyn Williams (born 31 August 1986) is a former Australian cricketer who is a right-handed batter and right-arm medium bowler. During the mid-2000s, she played six List A matches for Western Australia in the Women's National Cricket League (WNCL).
