= Robert Williams (physician, died 1845) =

English physician

- Born: 1787? London
- Died: 24 November 1845
- Occupation: Physician

Robert Williams (1787? – 24 November 1845) was an English physician.

== Biography ==
Williams born in London about 1787, was admitted a pensioner of Trinity College, Cambridge, on 27 June 1804, graduating in 1810 as M.B. and in 1816 as M.D. At the Royal College of Physicians he was admitted an inceptor candidate on 12 July 1816, a candidate on 23 December 1816, and a fellow on 22 December 1817. He served the office of censor in 1831, and he was declared an elect on 20 March 1844. He was elected assistant-physician to St. Thomas's Hospital on 11 December 1816, and on 1 October 1817 he was elected physician to the charity in the room of William Lister, an office he retained until his death.

Williams died at his house in Lower Bedford Place on 24 November 1845. He occupied himself for many years in an attempt to ascertain the virtues and properties of the drugs then in common use, for he was engaged throughout his life in seeking for specific remedies to cure disease. In the course of these inquiries he discovered the curative power of iodide of potassium in the later stages of syphilis. He also introduced bromide of potassium into English practice, though he did not employ it in the treatment of epilepsy. He was the author of ‘Elements of Medicine,’ London, 1836–41, 2 vols. 8vo.
