= 5642 Bobbywilliams =

Stony asteroid and Mars-crosser

Discovery
- Discovered by: H. E. Holt
- Discovery site: Palomar Obs.
- Discovery date: 27 July 1990

Designations
- Named after: Bobby G. Williams (JPL engineer)
- Alternative designations: 1990 OK_{1}
- Minor planet category: Mars-crosser

Orbital characteristics
- Epoch 4 September 2017 (JD 2458000.5)
- Uncertainty parameter 0
- Observation arc: 41.97 yr (15,330 days)
- Aphelion: 3.0867 AU
- Perihelion: 1.5454 AU
- Semi-major axis: 2.3161 AU
- Eccentricity: 0.3327
- Orbital period (sidereal): 3.52 yr (1,287 days)
- Mean anomaly: 235.13°
- Mean motion: 0° 16^{m} 46.56^{s} / day
- Inclination: 24.956°
- Longitude of ascending node: 310.12°
- Argument of perihelion: 39.038°

Physical characteristics
- Dimensions: 4.71 km (calculated)
- Synodic rotation period: 4.8341±0.0003 h
- Geometric albedo: 0.20 (assumed)
- Spectral type: S
- Absolute magnitude (H): 14.0 · 14.24±0.23

5642 Bobbywilliams, provisional designation 1990 OK_{1}, is an eccentric, stony asteroid and Mars-crosser from the inner regions of the asteroid belt, approximately 4.7 kilometers in diameter.

It was discovered on 27 July 1990, by American astronomer Henry E. Holt at Palomar Observatory in California, United States. The asteroid was named for JPL engineer Bobby Williams.

== Orbit and classification ==
Bobbywilliams orbits the Sun in the inner main-belt at a distance of 1.5–3.1 AU once every 3 years and 6 months (1,287 days). Its orbit has an eccentricity of 0.33 and an inclination of 25° with respect to the ecliptic. A first precovery was taken at the Australian Siding Spring Observatory in 1975, extending the body's observation arc by 15 years prior to its official discovery at Palomar.

== Physical characteristics ==
=== Rotation period ===
In July 2011, a rotational lightcurve of Bobbywilliams was obtained from photometric observations by astronomer Julian Oey at both the Australian Kingsgrove (E19) and Leura (E17) observatories. Lightcurve analysis gave a well-defined rotation period of 4.8341 hours with a brightness variation of 0.05 magnitude (U=3).

=== Diameter and albedo ===
The Collaborative Asteroid Lightcurve Link assumes a standard albedo for stony asteroids of 0.20 and calculates a diameter of 4.71 kilometers with an absolute magnitude of 14.0.

== Naming ==
This minor planet was named for Jet Propulsion Laboratory engineer Bobby G. Williams (born 1951), specialized in celestial mechanics and the navigation of space probes. He has been a leading navigation manager when NEAR Shoemaker had its rendezvous with the asteroids 253 Mathilde and 433 Eros, The official naming citation was published by the Minor Planet Center on 28 July 1999 (M.P.C. 35483).
