= Robert Williams (footballer, born 1927) =

English footballer (born 1927)

Personal information
- Full name: Raymond Robert Williams
- Date of birth: 25 October 1927
- Place of birth: Liverpool, England
- Position: Inside forward

Youth career
- Liverpool

Senior career*
Years	Team	Apps	(Gls)
1945–1951	Liverpool	0	(0)
1951	Wrexham	7	(0)
1951–1952	Shrewsbury Town	5	(0)
- * Club domestic league appearances and goals

Raymond Robert Williams (born 25 October 1927) is an English former professional footballer who played as an inside forward. He made appearances in the English Football League for Wrexham and Shrewsbury Town.
