= William Roberts (priest) =

16th-century Welsh priest

William Roberts was a Welsh priest in the 16th Century.

Newcombe was born in Castellmarch and educated at the University of Oxford. He held incumbencies at Shrivenham, Ruthin and Llandudno. He held Livings at Caerwys, Llanfachraeth, Festiniog, Llanddeniolen-juxta-Bangor, Llanfihangel-y-traethau and Llanbedroc-in-Llyn.

He was Archdeacon of Merioneth from 1524 until his death in 1561
