= Robert Williams (robot fatality) =

First person killed by a robot

- Born: Robert Nicholas Williams; May 2, 1953
- Died: January 25, 1979 (aged 25); Flat Rock, Michigan, U.S.
- Occupation: Factory worker
- Known for: First human killed by a robot

Robert Nicholas Williams (May 2, 1953 – January 25, 1979) was an American factory worker who was the first known human to be killed by a robot. While working at the Ford Motor Company's Michigan Casting Center, Williams was struck and killed by the arm of a robotic transfer vehicle.

== Death and litigation ==
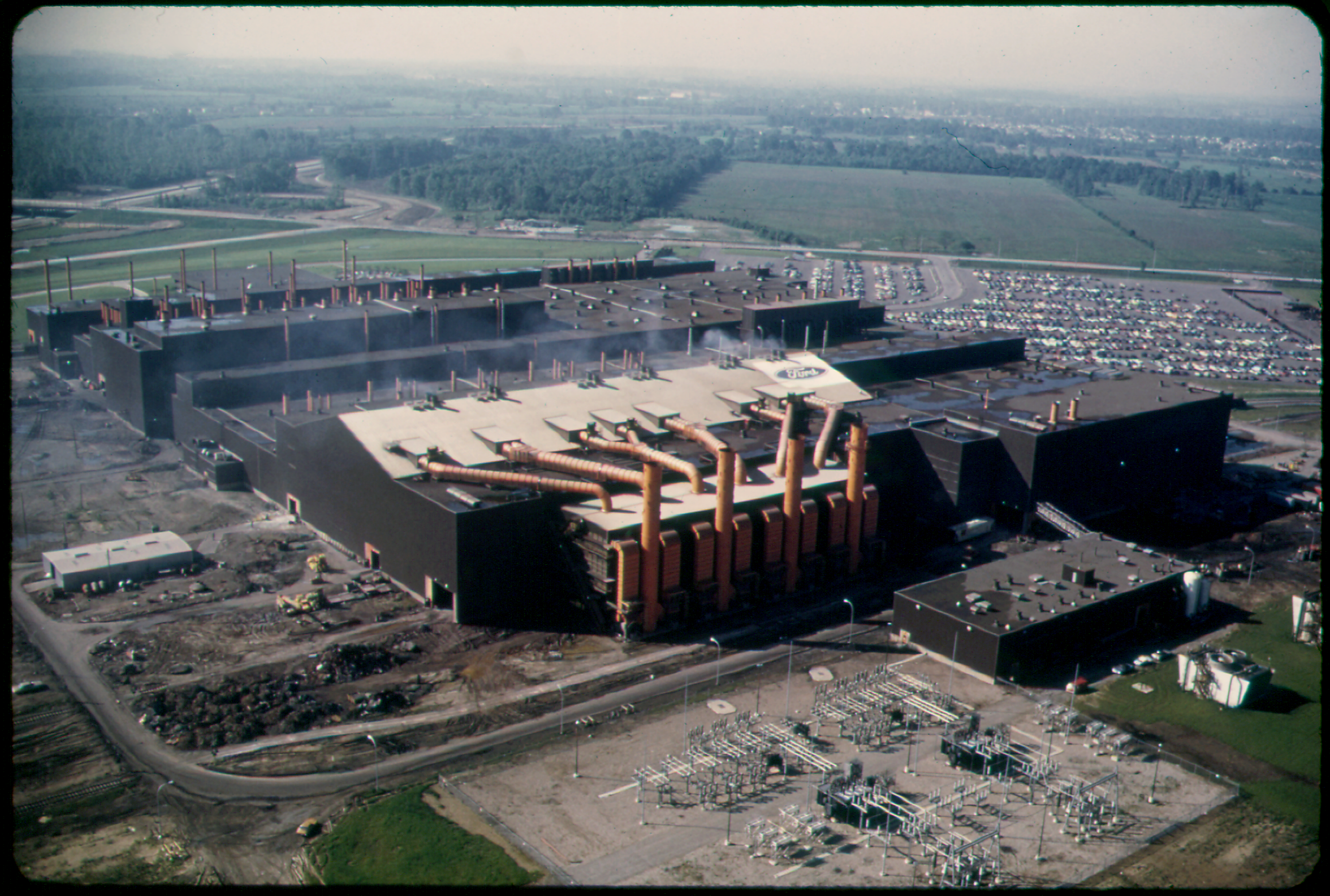
Joe Clark (June 1973), Ford Motor Company's New Casting Plant at Flat Rock. Photographed for DOCUMERICA.

Williams was one of three operators of the parts retrieval system, a five-story robotic system built by the Unit Handling Systems division of Litton Industries. The robot was designed to retrieve castings from high density storage shelves at the Flat Rock plant. Part of the machine included one-ton transfer vehicles, which were carts on rubber wheels equipped with mechanical arms to move castings to and from the shelves. When the robot gave erroneous inventory readings, Williams was asked to climb into the racks to retrieve parts manually. Another news account states the robot was not retrieving parts quickly enough.

He climbed into the third level of the storage rack, where he was struck from behind and crushed by one of the one-ton transfer vehicles, killing him instantly. His body remained in the shelf for 30 minutes until he was discovered by workers who were concerned about his disappearance.

His family sued the manufacturers of the robot, Litton Industries, alleging "that Litton was negligent in designing, manufacturing and supplying the storage system and in failing to warn [system operators] of foreseeable dangers in working within the storage area." In a 1983 jury decision, the court awarded his estate $10 million — the largest personal injury in Michigan at the time — and concluded that there simply were not enough safety measures in place to prevent such an accident from happening. The award was raised to $15 million in January 1984. Litton settled with the estate of Williams for an undisclosed amount in exchange for Litton not admitting negligence.

Litton had sought indemnification and recovery of judgment costs from Ford because Ford had not sent Williams to Litton-provided training and allowed Williams to enter the rack without engaging the lockout–tagout system, which shuts down the machine. Since Litton had already settled with the estate of Williams, the Michigan Court of Appeals denied the action, and that decision was later upheld by the Supreme Court of Michigan.

== See also ==
- Kenji Urada (1943/1944–1981), a Japanese man killed by a robot in 1981
- List of unusual deaths in the 20th century
- Robotic tech vest
