= Robert W. Williams (professor) =

American professor

Robert W. Williams is an American professor of genetics, genomics and informatics at the University of Tennessee Health Science Center.

== Life and works ==
=== Selected publications ===
- Churchill, G. A.; et al. (2004). "The Collaborative Cross, a community resource for the genetic analysis of complex traits". Nature Genetics. 36 (11): 1133–1137. doi:10.1038/ng1104-1133. hdl:10568/35319. PMID 15514660.
