= Cobot =

Robot that physically interacts with humans

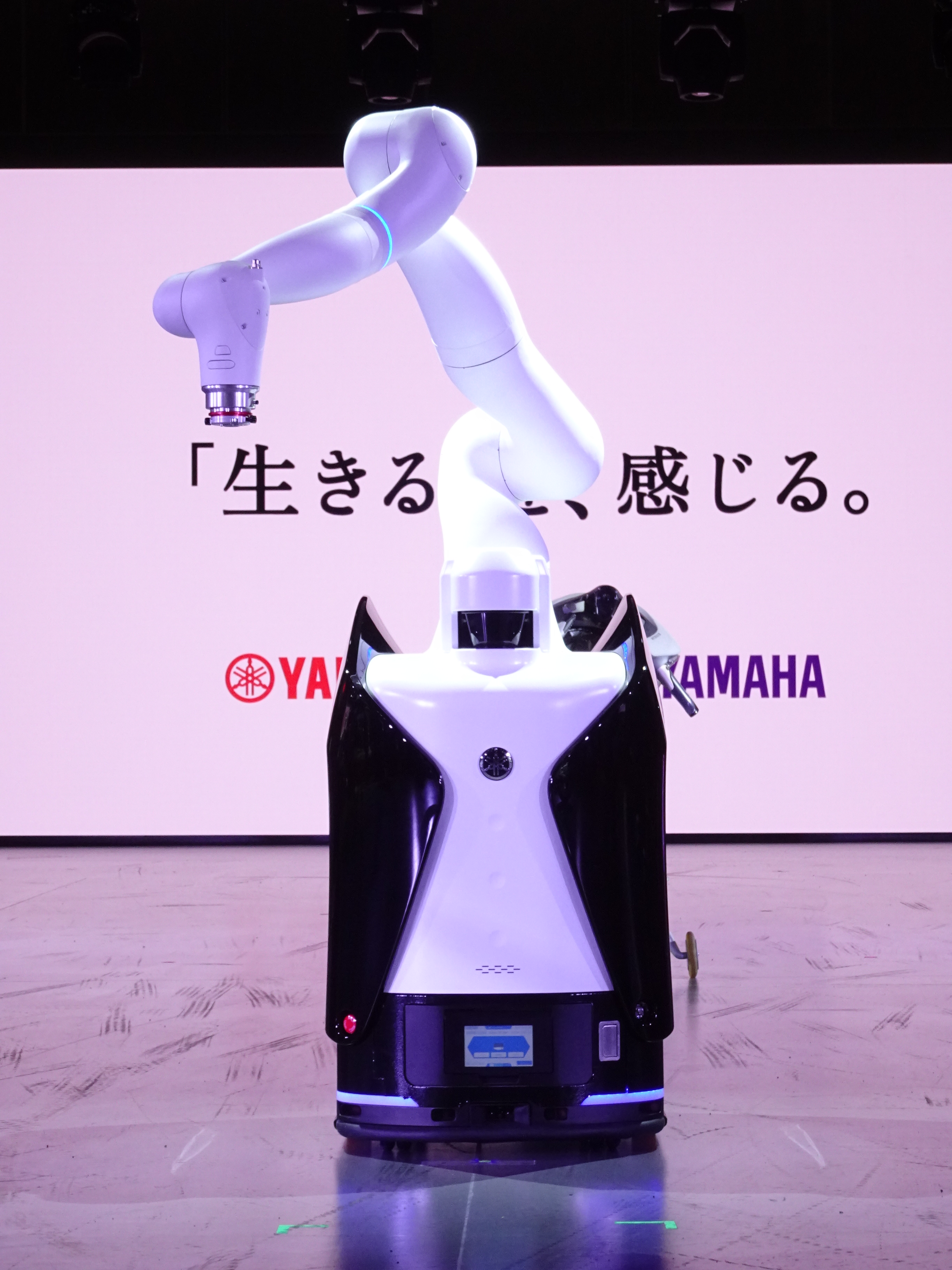
Yamaha Motor's cobot for industrial use. Self-propelled robot with a 7-axis arm.

A cobot, or collaborative robot, also known as a companion robot, is a robot intended for direct, close-range human–robot interaction. Cobot applications contrast with traditional industrial robot applications in which robots are isolated from human contact or the humans are protected by robotic tech vests. Cobot safety may rely on lightweight construction materials, rounded edges, and inherent limitation of speed and force, or on sensors and software that ensure safe behavior.

== Uses ==
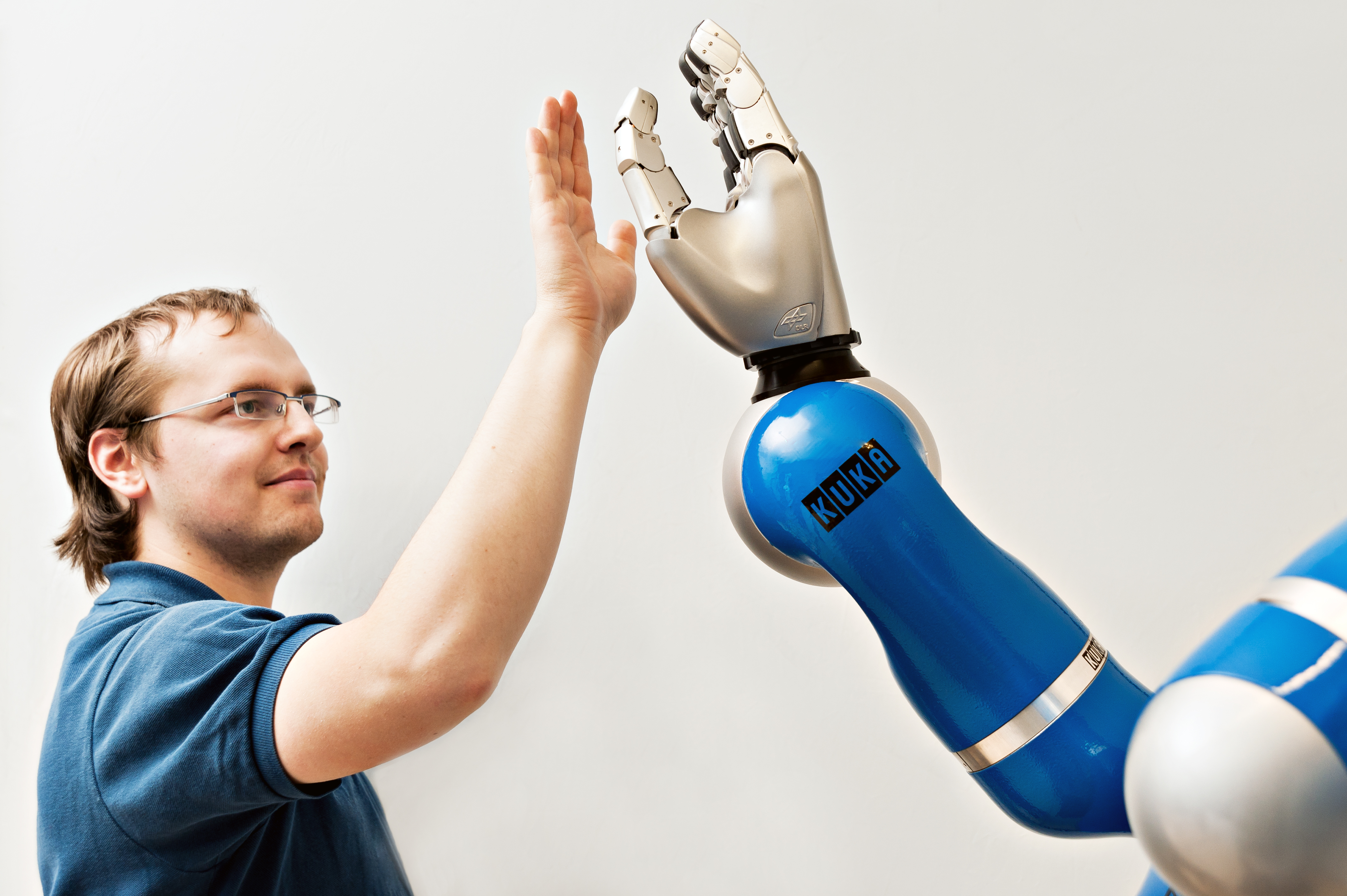
Thanks to sensors and other design features such as lightweight materials and rounded edges, collaborative robots (cobots) are able to interact directly and safely with humans.

The International Federation of Robotics (IFR), a global industry association of robot manufacturers and national robot associations, recognizes two main groups of robots: industrial robots used in automation and service robots for domestic and professional use. Service robots could be considered to be cobots as they are intended to work alongside humans. Industrial robots have traditionally worked separately from humans behind fences or other protective barriers, but cobots remove that separation.

As COBOTS operates safely and efficiently in a shared environment with humans, their versatility allows them to support a wide range of tasks in different settings, and their applications have also expanded rapidly in both public and industrial fields. Cobots can have many uses, from information robots in public spaces (an example of service robots), logistics robots that transport materials within a building, to industrial robots that help automate unergonomic tasks such as helping people moving heavy parts, or machine feeding or assembly operations.

The IFR defines four levels of collaboration between industrial robots and human workers:

- Coexistence: Human and robot work alongside each other without a fence, but with no shared workspace.
- Sequential collaboration: Humans and robots actively share a workspace but their motions work on the same part sequentially, not at the same time.
- Cooperation: Robot and human work on the same part at the same time, with both in motion.
- Responsive collaboration: The robot responds in real-time to movement of the human worker.

For safety, most industrial robots are isolated from human workers. Humanoid robots are now on the market and can tentatively share a space with humans, but are mostly capable of predictable, repetitive work. They are still primarily research models and have a high failure rate in their general interactions. As such, potential integration in homes with infants or pets is still being researched by companies.

In most industrial applications of cobots, the cobot and human worker share the same space but complete tasks independently or in sequential collaboration. Cooperation and responsive collaboration are less commonly seen and remain goals of the future.

== History ==
Cobots were invented in 1996 by J. Edward Colgate and Michael Peshkin, professors at Northwestern University. Their United States patent entitled, "Cobots" describes "an apparatus and method for direct physical interaction between a person and a general purpose manipulator controlled by a computer." Brent Gillespie, a postdoctoral researcher with Peshkin and Colgate who is now a professor at the University of Michigan, coined the word cobot for which he won fifty dollars in a naming contest.

The invention resulted from a 1994 General Motors initiative led by Prasad Akella of the GM Robotics Center and a 1995 General Motors Foundation research grant intended to find a way to make robots or robot-like equipment safe enough to team with people. The theoretical foundations for compliant robots which can monitor and detect forces applied to their kinematic structure and hence can detect collisions or be hand-guided by humans, have been laid in the mid-1980s by Oussama Khatib at Stanford University and further refined by Gerd Hirzinger and his team at German Aerospace Center.

Two target areas for Peshkin and Colgate were manufacturing and surgery. In manufacturing, their research culminated in a company called Cobotics, acquired by Stanley Assembly Technologies. They also applied their research to orthopedic surgery after a medical student approached them with the idea.

The first cobots assured human safety by having no internal source of motive power. Instead, motive power was provided by the human worker. The cobot's function was to allow computer control of motion, by redirecting or steering a payload, in a cooperative way with the human worker. Later, cobots provided limited amounts of motive power as well. General Motors and an industry working group used the term Intelligent Assist Device (IAD) as an alternative to cobot, which was viewed as too closely associated with the company Cobotics. At the time, the market demand for Intelligent Assist Devices and the safety standard "T15.1 Intelligent Assist Devices - Personnel Safety Requirements" was to improve industrial material handling and automotive assembly operations.

== Standards and guidelines ==
RIA BSR/T15.1, a draft safety standard for Intelligent Assist Devices, was published by the Robotic Industries Association, an industry working group in March 2002.

The robot safety standard (ANSI/RIA R15.06) was first published in 1986, after 4 years of development. It was updated with newer editions in 1992 and 1999. In 2011, ANSI/RIA R15.06 was updated again and is now a national adoption of the combined ISO 10218-1 and ISO 10218-2 safety standards. The ISO standards are based on ANSI/RIA R15.06-1999. A companion document was developed by ISO TC299 WG3 and published as an ISO Technical Specification, ISO/TS 15066:2016, which covers collaborative robotics, including their requirements and integrated applications. ISO 10218-1 contains the requirements for robots – including those with optional capabilities to enable collaborative applications. ISO 10218-2:2011 and ISO/TS 15066 contain the safety requirements for both collaborative and non-collaborative robot applications. Technically, the collaborative robot application includes the robot, end effector (mounted to the robot arm or manipulator to perform tasks which can include manipulating or handling objects) and the workpiece (if an object is handled).

The safety of a collaborative robot application is an issue, since there is no official definition of cobot within robot standardization. It is considered to be a sales or marketing term because "collaborative" is determined by the application. For example, a robot wielding a cutting tool or a sharp workpiece would be hazardous to people. However the same robot sorting foam chips would likely be safe. Consequently, the risk assessment accomplished by the robot integrator addresses the intended application (use). ISO 10218 Parts 1 and 2 rely on risk assessment (according to ISO 12100). In Europe, the Machinery Directive is applicable, however the robot by itself is a partial machine. The robot system (robot with end effector) and the robot application are considered complete machines.

== See also ==
- Air-Cobot, a collaborative mobile robot to inspect aircraft
- Automated guided vehicle
