= Billy Roberts (footballer, born 1880) =

English footballer

Personal information
- Full name: William Henry Roberts
- Date of birth: 1880
- Place of birth: Bromley, England
- Height: 5 ft 8 in (1.73 m)
- Position: Inside left

Senior career*
Years	Team	Apps	(Gls)
- White Star Wanderers
–	Tottenham Hotspur		
1901–1902	Stockport County	0	(0)
–	Grays United		
1903–1905	Brighton & Hove Albion	67	(15)
1905–1906	Queens Park Rangers	22	(1)
1906–1907	Preston North End	2	(0)
- * Club domestic league appearances and goals

William Henry Roberts (born 1880 in Bromley, deceased) was an English professional footballer who made two appearances in the Football League for Preston North End. He also played for Southern League clubs Tottenham Hotspur, Grays United, Brighton & Hove Albion, where he was top scorer in the 1903–04 season with nine goals in all competitions, and Queens Park Rangers. He played as an inside left.
