= List of cardiovascular clinical trials =

This is a list of cardiovascular clinical trials, categorized and alphabetized.

== Acute coronary syndrome ==
- International Studies of Infarct Survival (ISIS) - four randomized controlled trials of several drugs for treating suspected acute myocardial infarction.

== Arrhythmias ==
- Cardiac Arrhythmia Suppression Trial (CAST) - randomized controlled trial designed to test the hypothesis that suppression of premature ventricular complexes (PVC) with class I antiarrhythmic agents after a myocardial infarction (MI) would reduce mortality.

== Epidemiology ==
- Busselton Health Study - a prospective cohort study of residents of the Western Australian city of Busselton regarding cardiovascular disease, pulmonary function, diabetes, and cancer.
- Caerphilly Heart Disease Study - prospective cohort study of the residents from Caerphilly, South Wales, to examine relationships between a wide range of social, lifestyle, dietary, and other factors with incident vascular disease.
- Framingham Heart Study - long-term, ongoing cardiovascular cohort study of residents of the city of Framingham, Massachusetts.
- Nurses' Health Study - series of prospective studies that examine epidemiology and the long-term effects of nutrition, hormones, environment, and nurses' work-life on health and disease development.
- Seven Countries Study - a prospective cohort study that examined the relationships between lifestyle, diet, coronary heart disease, and stroke in different populations.
- Strong Heart Study - cohort study of cardiovascular disease (CVD) and its risk factors among American Indian men and women.

== Heart failure ==
- Multicenter Automatic Defibrillator Implantation Trial (MADIT) - a series of randomized controlled trials designed to test the hypothesis that implantable cardioverter defibrillator (ICD) therapy in moderately high-risk coronary patients would significantly reduce death.
- RALES (trial) - randomized controlled trial comparing spironolactone to placebo when added to standard care in patients with advanced heart failure.

== Hypertension ==
- Antihypertensive and Lipid Lowering Treatment to Prevent Heart Attack Trial (ALLHAT) - a randomized controlled trial of calcium channel blocker, ACE inhibitor, and thiazide diuretic therapy in lowering the incidence of CV events.
- Systolic Blood Pressure Intervention Trial (SPRINT) - a randomized controlled trial of intensive BP control

== Lipids ==
- AIM-HIGH (trial) - a randomized controlled trial of niacin for increasing HDL levels.
- HDL-Atherosclerosis Treatment Study (HATS) - a randomized controlled trial that studied people with coronary heart disease and compared a combination of simvastatin and niacin with antioxidant vitamin therapy.
- Heart Protection Study - a randomized controlled trial that studied the cholesterol-lowering drug simvastatin and vitamin supplementation in people at risk of cardiovascular disease.
- JUPITER trial - a randomized controlled trial to evaluate whether statins reduce heart attacks and strokes in people with normal cholesterol levels.
- PROVE-IT TIMI 22 - a randomized controlled trial that compared intensive vs. moderate-dose statin therapy immediately after a heart attack.
- Scandinavian Simvastatin Survival Study (4S) - a randomized controlled trial that studied the use of the cholesterol-lowering drug simvastatin in people with moderately raised cholesterol and coronary heart disease.
- West of Scotland Coronary Prevention Study (WOSCOPS) - a randomized controlled trial that compared the cholesterol-lowering drug pravastatin in patients with no previous history of a heart attack.
