= Clinical trial naming conventions =

Clinical trials are often assigned contrived acronyms. Some common themes include acronyms excluding words from the acronym and including letters taken from the middle of words. It is suggested that the use of acronyms in titles is associated with a higher citation rate of research publications.

== Background ==
Acronyms were first used to identify clinical trials in the 1970s. The first identified instance was "UGDP", an initialism for University Group Diabetes Program. The first trial title commonly pronounced as an English-language word or words came in 1982 with the publication of "MRFIT", referring to the Multiple Risk Factor Intervention Trial, and spoken as "Mr. Fit" or "the Mr. Fit trial".

The term "acronymophilia" was coined in 1994 to refer to the overuse of acronyms in medicine.

An article in the Annals of Internal Medicine classified clinical trial titles into five broad groups: un-abbreviated titles; initialisms that are not pronounced as English words; homonyms pronounced as a recognizable English word but spelled in a novel way; descriptive medical words relating to the study topic, such as CARDIAC and RALES; medical or health words that are not related to the topic of the study, such as ALIVE or RESCUE; and other English words not related to the topic, with a wide variety of subjects, including myths, places, musical terms, animals, and space, such as ISIS, CASANOVA, and APRICOT.

== Examples ==
A scientific study ranking acronyms was published in the British Medical Journal. Some of the negatively graded criteria include using letters that do not begin a word, and including letters in the acronym that are not found in the title. According to their metric, some of the worst names included "METGO: A 48-week, randomized, double-blind, double-observer, placebo-controlled multicenter trial of combination METhotrexate and intramuscular GOld therapy in rheumatoid arthritis", "PERFORM: Prevention of cerebrovascular and cardiovascular Events of ischaemic origin with teRutroban in patients with a history oF ischaemic strOke or tRansient ischaeMic attack", and "TYPHOON: Trial to assess the use of the cYPHer sirolimus-eluting coronary stent in acute myocardial infarction treated with BallOON angioplasty". Their ranking of acronyms shows a decrease in measured quality between 2000 and 2012.

In a letter to the International Journal of Cardiology, Tsung O. Cheng called out his own field as prone to overuse of contrived acronyms, calling it a "persistent problem". He was spurred to write the letter after he reviewed nine articles about a study named "ZAHARA" without finding any explanation of what the acronym meant.

Other clinical trials that have been noted in publications for their acronyms include: TORPEDO (Thrombus Obliteration by Rapid Percutaneous Endovenous Intervention (PEVI) in Deep Venous Occlusion) and BATMAN (Bisphosphonate and Anastrozole Trial – Bone Maintenance Algorithm Assessment).

== See also ==
- CALERIE
- ALMANAC
- PARAMOUNT trial
- JUPITER trial
- PROVE-IT TIMI 22
- RECOVERY trial
