= Acronyms in healthcare =

Acronyms are very commonly used in healthcare settings. They are formed from the lead letters of words relating to medications, organisations, procedures and diagnoses. They come from both English and Latin roots. Acronyms have been described as jargon. and their use has been shown to impact the safety of patients in hospitals, owing to ambiguity and legibility.

== Formulation ==
Acronyms in healthcare are formed from the lead letters of words relating to medications, organisations, procedures and diagnoses. They come from both English and Latin roots. The use of acronyms and abbreviations is expanding rapidly.

== Criticism ==
Acronyms have been described as jargon. Studies have been conducted investigating the effect of acronyms on communication and, in some studies, even healthcare professionals are unclear as to the meaning of many acronyms. The use of acronyms to describe medical trials has been criticised as potentially leading to incorrect assumptions based on similar acronyms, difficulty accessing trial results when common words are used, and causing a cognitive bias when positive acronyms are used to portray trials (e.g. "HOPE" or "SMART").

Use of abbreviations, such as those relating to the route of administration or dose of a medication, can be confusing and is the most common source of medication errors. Use of some acronyms has been shown to impact the safety of patients in hospitals, and "do not use lists" have been published at a national level in the US.

== Examples ==
A number of sources provide lists of initialisms and acronyms commonly used in health care. The terms listed are used in the English language within the healthcare systems and by healthcare professionals of various countries. Examples of terms include BP, COPD, TIMI score, and SOAP. There is no standardised list.

== See also ==
- List of medical mnemonics
- Clinical trial naming conventions
