= Jane Armitage =

British academic

Jane Armitage OBE FRCP FFPH
- Born: Jane Margaret Armitage
- Scientific career
- Fields: Cardiovascular disease Clinical trials
- Workplaces: University of Oxford; Clinical Trial Service Unit
- Website: www.ndph.ox.ac.uk/team/jane-armitage

Jane Margaret Armitage is a professor of clinical trials and epidemiology in the Clinical Trial Service Unit at the University of Oxford. She works on the epidemiology of cardiovascular disease and has led large-scale randomized controlled trials.

== Early life and education ==
Armitage qualified in medicine in 1979. She worked in respiratory medicine, geriatrics and diabetes.

== Research and career ==
In 1990 Armitage joined the Clinical Trial Service Unit. She has served as Director of Training & Career Development as well as leading the Medical Research Council Population Health Research Unit. She is best known for her work on the safety of statins.

Armitage led the 1999 Medical Research Council and British Heart Foundation Heart Protection Study, which included 20,000 participants. The study is the largest that investigates the use of statins to prevent cardiovascular disease. She was also the lead for the Study of the Effectiveness of Additional Reductions in Cholesterol and Homocysteine (SEARCH) study and the Heart Protection Study 2 (HPS2) Treatment of HDL to Reduce the Incidence of Vascular Events (THRIVE) study. She demonstrated that statins are also safe for patients with rheumatoid arthritis.

Armitage was Chief Investigator for the ASCEND aspirin trial, which studied cardiovascular disease in 15,480 patients with diabetes. ASCEND was the largest ever study that had every been performed to investigate whether aspirin should be used to prevent cardiovascular disease in diabetic patients. The trial found that whilst aspirin reduces the risk of cardiovascular events by 12%, it increases the risk of major bleeding. As an addition to the ASCEND study, Armitage was supported by Alzheimer's Research UK to study the impact of aspirin and fish oil on memory and cognition in patients with diabetes and Alzheimer's disease. They also studied whether aspirin changes the risk of developing dementia and Alzheimer's disease. She also investigated whether fish oil and vitamin D supplements reduced cardiovascular disease in diabetic patients, but found they had no impact.

She is an editor for the journal Atherosclerosis.

=== Awards and honours ===
In 2019, Armitage was appointed as an Officer of the Order of the British Empire for services to medical research
