= EPharmaSolutions =

Contract Research Organization and Clinical Research Software Provider

ePharmaSolutions (ePS), as a contract research organization, is an American clinical research provider. The solutions include proprietary software applications and global clinical services that focus on the major areas of clinical study delays.

ePS was founded in 2001 by Lance Converse and is headquartered in Plymouth Meeting, Pennsylvania, employing 60+ clinical researchers and technologists. ePharmaSolutions' Clinical Trial Portal technology won the 2009 and 2013 Bio-IT World for “Best in Class Clinical Trial Technology” and the 2013 Microsoft Lifesciences Innovation Award making it the most widely used Clinical Trial Portal and Electronic Trial Master File solution in the pharmaceutical industry with over 350,000 users in 130 countries.

== Clinical trial software ==
- Clinical Trial Portal Clinical Trial Portal- Single-sign-on application used by more than 300,000 clinical researchers in 130 countries.
- User Management Application & Vendor Integration Manager - Single sign-on and user provisioning applications for clinical trial technologies
- Investigator Database - over 300,000 investigators in 120 countries
- Site Feasibility Application - secure online site feasibility and ranking application
- Secure Document Exchange - online completion of study documents and contracts with digital signature
- Safety Letter Distribution - safety letter distribution and tracking system
- Learning Management System - delivery and tracking of on and offline training and certification programs
- Patient Recruitment Manager - develop and track global patient recruitment and retention programs
- Electronic Monitor Visit Report Application - track all monitor visits using the on or offline capabilities (with electronic signature)
- Electronic Trial Master File - tracks the completion and filing of clinical trial documents via configurable workflow and reference models.

== Global clinical research services ==
- Site Feasibility and Selection - Access to over 300,000 investigators profiled by experience and patient populations
- Site Activation - Secure document exchange technology with site support services
- Study/Site/Systems Training - Training of clinical research professionals
- Inter-rater Reliability Services and Data Monitoring - Custom tailored solutions for most every scale, delivered in over 50 countries
- Patient Recruitment and Retention - Full service solutions supporting programs in over 60 countries
