= West of Scotland Coronary Prevention Study =

Pharmaceutical clinical trial

- Study type: randomized controlled trial
- Dates: enrollment February 1989 through September 1991 with 4.9 years follow-up
- Locations: West of Scotland, Glasgow
- Published: 1995
- Article: Shepherd, James; et al. (16 November 1995). "Prevention of Coronary Heart Disease with Pravastatin in Men with Hypercholesterolemia". New England Journal of Medicine. 333 (20): 1301–1308. doi:10.1056/NEJM199511163332001. PMID 7566020.

The West of Scotland Coronary Prevention Study (also known as WOSCOPS) was a landmark randomized controlled trial, published in 1995, that investigated the effects of pravastatin, a cholesterol-lowering drug, on primary prevention of coronary heart disease (CHD) in men with hypercholesterolemia. Conducted in the early 1990s, this study provided critical evidence on the benefits of statins in reducing cardiovascular events in individuals without a history of CHD. It concluded that statin treatment reduced CHD events by 31% after nearly five years of treatment.

== Background ==
Cardiovascular disease, particularly CHD, is a leading cause of death globally. High low-density lipoprotein (LDL) cholesterol levels are a well-established risk factor for developing CHD. While previous studies had demonstrated the benefits of lipid-lowering agents in patients with existing CHD, the WOSCOPS was one of the first large-scale trials to evaluate the efficacy of statins for primary prevention in individuals without a prior history of cardiovascular events.

== Study design ==
WOSCOPS was a multicenter, randomized, double-blind, placebo-controlled trial conducted in Scotland. The study enrolled 6,595 men aged 45 to 64 years (average 55 years) with elevated total cholesterol levels (average 272 mg/dl) and LDL cholesterol levels (average 192 mg/dL) and no previous history of myocardial infarction. The enrollment period was from February 1989 through September 1991. Participants were randomly assigned to receive either pravastatin (40 mg daily) or a placebo. The primary endpoint was the incidence of nonfatal myocardial infarction and death from CHD. Secondary endpoints included all-cause mortality, coronary revascularization procedures, and stroke. The patients were followed an average of 4.9 years after enrollment. Patient medical records and the national death registry were used to determine clinical results.

== Key findings ==
The results of the WOSCOPS, published in 1995, demonstrated several significant benefits of pravastatin therapy for the primary prevention of CHD:

- Reduction in CHD events: Men treated with pravastatin had a 31% reduction in the risk of nonfatal myocardial infarction or death from CHD compared to those receiving the placebo.
- Decreased all-cause mortality: There was a 22% reduction in all-cause mortality in the pravastatin group.
- Fewer revascularization procedures: In the pravastatin group, the need for coronary artery bypass grafting (CABG) or percutaneous coronary intervention (PCI) was reduced by 37%.
- Lower incidence of stroke: Pravastatin therapy was associated with a trend towards a reduction in the incidence of stroke but was not considered statistically significant.

== Clinical implications ==
The findings of the WOSCOPS had substantial implications for the prevention of CHD. This trial added to the evidence that the incidence of CHD can be reduced with statin therapy. Long-term follow-up demonstrated a sustained reduction in death and coronary events.

== Long-term impact ==
The WOSCOPS was a pivotal trial that contributed to the broader acceptance and use of statins in the primary prevention of cardiovascular disease. Its findings have been corroborated by subsequent studies and meta-analyses, reinforcing the role of statins in reducing the risk of CHD in various populations.

== See also ==
- HDL-Atherosclerosis Treatment Study
- Heart Protection Study
- JUPITER trial
- PROVE-IT TIMI 22
- Scandinavian Simvastatin Survival Study
