= Decentralized Trials & Research Alliance =

Non-governmental, not-for-profit association

Decentralized Trials & Research Alliance (DTRA) is a 501(c)(3) nonprofit organization in the United States that works to make research participation accessible for all. DTRA works to accelerate the adoption of innovative research methods, including decentralized elements, by collaborating with a community of global stakeholders.

== Launch of DTRA ==
Dr. Amir Kalali, M.D. and Craig Lipset are the organization's co-chairs and launched the DTRA on December 10, 2020. They discussed the challenges that decentralized research can address in a piece published in STAT on January 29, 2021, where they confirmed that membership in the organization had reached over 100 collaborating organizations that share the mission of DTRA.

== The importance of decentralized research ==
Disadvantaged communities have traditionally been largely underrepresented in clinical trials. Decentralized research that leverages available communications, telemedicine, artificial intelligence and other technologies has been proposed as a way to help recruit a more broadly representative patient population by gender, ethnicity, age, geography, income and more.

MedCity News highlighted decentralized trials as one of the strategies that would make 2021 a "banner year" for life science industries, and cited the DTRA as uniting "industry stakeholders with a singular mission to make clinical trial participation widely accessible by advancing policies, research practices and new technologies in decentralized clinical research".

== Impact of COVID-19 ==
As a result of travel restrictions and the social distancing required to mitigate against the COVID-19 pandemic, clinical trials were affected worldwide. According to a study published in June 2020 by researchers at the University of Texas MD Anderson Cancer Center, of the 1,052 clinical trials that were suspended during the period from March 1 to April 26, 2020, at least 905 were suspended because of COVID-19.

It has been noted that the impacts of COVID-19 may have set back clinical trial research several years because of prospective patients' reluctance or inability to schedule physical visits at research locations. Decentralized clinical trials have emerged as an answer to that problem, as outlined in a report from Oracle Health Sciences.

Kalali told MobiHealth News in December 2021, "The benefits of decentralized research methodologies have been apparent for some time, but adoption has been slow due to many factors including culture and the lack of a forum for stakeholders to collaborate. The COVID-19 pandemic has forced organizations to adopt decentralized methodologies, which have the potential to broadly accelerate drug development."
