= Decentralised clinical trial =

Operational model for clinical trials

A decentralised clinical trial (DCT) is an operational model for clinical trials that takes place at a location of convenience for the participant rather than at a clinic or hospital. This is accomplished through digital health technologies, home nursing visits, wearable devices, at-home blood sample collection, and other technological and operational innovations.

== Hybrid and full DCT approaches ==
Participants never visit a site physically in a fully decentralised clinical trial. Contact with the investigational team is instead conducted remotely. There are also many clinical trials which merely involve elements of DCTs without being fully decentralised. These approaches can include, but are not limited to:

- Digital methods to recruit participants (e.g., social media or digital advertising media)
- Prescreening and screening online
- Telehealth visits with a healthcare provider
- Electronic consent or mailing of the informed consent form
- Postal delivery of the drug under investigation
- Patient supported administration where needed
- Monitoring of adherence to the treatment
- Home health nursing
- Patient electronic diaries for reporting events (Electronic patient-reported outcomes)
- At-home sample collection
- Wearable technology or smart devices to collect vitals and other data

A hybrid DCT would be any clinical trial which incorporates one or more of these approaches while including on-site trial activities.

== Frequency of DCT approaches in randomised clinical trials ==
Although full DCTs are uncommon, decentralised approaches for data collection are frequently implemented in clinical trials already, often alongside on-site data collection. A systematic review found that strategies like telemedicine visits, patient-reported outcomes, wearable devices and home health visits were reported in over two-thirds of clinical trial protocols from 2019 to 2020. It is worth noting, however, that this review took place during the COVID-19 lockdowns. This proportion could have been artificially inflated during this period due to social distancing requirements. Decentralised conduct including other types of trial activities was reported in less than 25.6% of the 254 protocols in this review.

== Possible advantages and disadvantages ==
Randomised controlled clinical trials are vital for studying the safety and efficacy of new medical therapies. They have been a critical part of medical innovation since the first half of the 20th century, when governments around the world began to require that drug manufacturers ensure product safety before doctors can prescribe medications. Regulatory agencies require that the benefits of research involving humans outweigh the risk of harm to a participant, which is evaluated by an ethics committee before the research starts.

In site-based clinical trials, participants are required to visit a clinic or hospital for blood draws, physical exams, vital sign checks and other procedures. This can require significant traveling, as the site is not always going to be located nearby. Some researchers have found that participants living in lower-income neighborhoods or rural areas tend to travel more for clinical trials. Indeed, geographical location is one of the most cited barriers to participation, particularly for people living in medically under-served areas. Moving activities to a setting closer to the patient, such as in their home or immediate surroundings, may reduce the burden incurred by frequent visits to a clinic. In turn, this may improve participant recruitment and retention.

The use of technology is not spread evenly across different age groups, levels of education, socio-economic statuses, and regions; a phenomenon broadly referred to as the digital divide. Although DCTs have the promise of recruiting more diverse populations due to the lack of travel required, participating in them requires a base level of digital literacy. As such, DCTs or DCT approaches may end up excluding some people for whom this would be a barrier, leading to less diversity in some regards. In addition, some activities integral to the DCT approach may shift burden to the participant, while in a traditional trial, these tasks would be offloaded to others. There are also concerns about the lack of in-person visits with healthcare providers. Speaking with a healthcare provider in person is important in building and maintaining a therapeutic relationship. While digital and telephonic communication can still lead to relationship-building, the capacity for this is reduced, especially among those who are not accustomed to communicating solely by these means.

== History ==
In 1988, researchers at the University of Oxford conducted the first randomised clinical trial with no interaction in person. The entire study took place by post. The aim was to test daily aspirin intake as a preventive measure against mortality from cardiovascular disease. The researchers randomised participants to take either 500 mg aspirin daily or no treatment. Participants were sent a short survey every six months where they were asked about their adherence to the treatment plan, as well as any signs or symptoms of cardiovascular disease.

The first DCT to involve digital technology was conducted in 2003. Dubbed the International Verapamil SR/Trandolapril Study (INVEST), the aim was to compare calcium antagonist strategies with non-calcium antagonist strategies in management of hypertension. INVEST utilised a "novel, electronic, 'paper-less' system for direct on-screen data entry, randomization and drug distribution from a mail pharmacy linked to the coordination center via the Internet," and is considered the first internet-based clinical trial.

Interest in DCTs has only increased throughout the 21st century so far, with advancements in technology and increasing digital literacy. The social distancing requirements implemented during the COVID-19 lockdowns meant that clinical trials had to leverage more DCT elements, which revitalised interest in DCTs. In a 2021 article about the diverse strategies employed in the life sciences industry during the lockdowns, a science writer listed DCTs as one that would stand the test of time. They describe how Clinical Research Organisations (CROs) have implemented DCT approaches quickly with the need to cut back on face-to-face interaction, and how clinical trial management software has emerged to fill this need and help them conduct these trials. The Innovative Medicines Initiative (IMI), a partnership between the European Union and the European Federation of Pharmaceutical Industries and Associations, launched a call in 2018 to develop a "center of excellence" in DCTs, exploring the concept to its fullest extent to address the challenges of recruitment and retention inherent in clinical trial conduct. The Trials@Home consortium was established in 2019 in response to this call. In addition to studying ethical, legal and regulatory aspects of DCTs, the project kicked off a pan-European, proof-of-concept clinical trial to test whether the quality of the data from a fully decentralised clinical trial would be the same as a conventional one. Results from the trial are expected in 2025, along with an official recommendation.

In 2022, the European Commission, the Heads of Medicines Agencies, and the European Medicines Initiative released a joint paper titled, "Recommendation paper on decentralized elements in clinical trials."

In September 2024, the U.S. Food & Drug Administration finalised guidelines for the conduct of clinical trials using DCT approaches, a "guidance for industry, investigators, and other interested parties."

That same year, the World Health Organization released guidance for best practices for clinical trials, which included a component on decentralised clinical trials. Additionally, the International Council for Harmonisation of Technical Requirements for Pharmaceuticals for Human Use (ICH) released guidelines on Good Clinical Practice for considerations on DCTs.

== See also ==
- Decentralized Trials & Research Alliance
