= Site management organization =

Organization that provides clinical trial-related services

A Site Management Organization (SMO) is an organization that provides clinical trial-related services to a contract research organization (CRO), a pharmaceutical company, a biotechnology company, a medical device company, or a clinical site. The site is usually a hospital or a similar health care institution that has adequate infrastructure and staff to meet the requirements of the clinical trial protocol. The scope of an SMO's responsibility is limited to the site and hence the eponymous title. Some (but not all) of the responsibilities include:

- Contract
- Submission for Institutional Review Board or Independent Ethics Committee (IRB/IEC) approval. In Europe, submission to Ethics Committee is often done by sponsor or by CRO, i.e. not by SMO
- Patient counseling
- Patient recruitment
- Patient follow-up
- Informed consent form (ICF) translation into vernacular languages . In Europe, this is often done by the Sponsor or CRO
- Site initiation and trial close-out operations
- Trial-related documents archival and maintenance
- Reporting serious adverse events to the Sponsor or CRO and the IRB/IEC
- Ensuring protocol compliance
- Advising & alerting investigators of potential protocol violations
- Advising & alerting investigators of potential ICH-GCP violations

== Origin ==
SMOs are relatively new entrants into the field of clinical research and have since grown at an explosive rate in the U.S. and other countries like India, China and Brazil where clinical trial outsourcing has been at its peak. The fledgling SMO industry is currently valued at about $3 billion and is expected to grow further according to recent estimates from R&D Directions - a market research firm.
