= Independent clinical trials =

Trials promoted by scientific organizations

An independent clinical trial is a clinical trial promoted by scientific organizations and funded by public or charitable money, research centres or voluntary groups.

A large number of clinical research questions that are of little or no interest to commercial sponsors but still need to be addressed, given their importance to public health and to improving diagnosis and therapy for groups of patients of varying size, such as questions about the best treatment options for a particular illness. This is contrast with most clinican studies, which are funded by pharmaceutical companies on drugs and devices. These are product-oriented, aiming to test the benefits of a particular treatment.

Independent clinical studies are of key importance for improving the effectiveness, safety and cost/benefit balance, such as the long-term risks and rare adverse reactions to treatments, comparing the available treatment options, evaluating improvements in quality of life or in follow-up of procedures and rehabilitation strategies. Investing in independent clinical research brings dividends for society in terms of reducing the impact of diseases, improving care strategies, and containing costs of health systems.
