= Paul Ridker =

American epidemiologist and academic

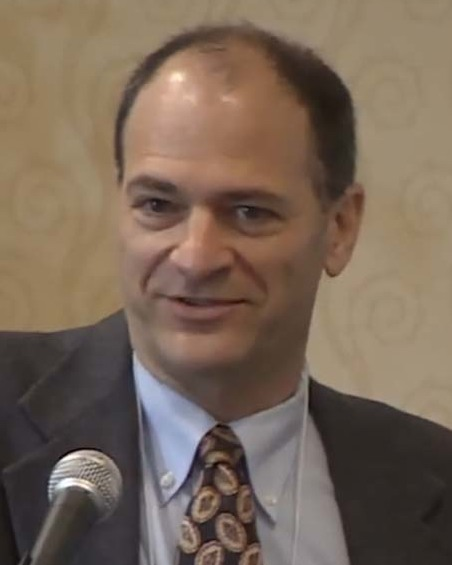
- Born: 1959 (age 66–67); St. Louis, Missouri
- Education: Brown University; Harvard Medical School; Harvard School of Public Health
- Scientific career
- Workplaces: Harvard Medical School; Harvard School of Public Health

Paul M. Ridker (born 1959) is a cardiovascular epidemiologist and biomedical researcher. He is currently the Eugene Braunwald Professor of Medicine at Harvard University and Brigham and Women's Hospital, where he directs the Center for Cardiovascular Disease Prevention. Ridker also holds an appointment as Professor in the Department of Epidemiology at the Harvard T.H. Chan School of Public Health.

Ridker's research has provided proof-of-principle for the inflammation hypothesis of atherosclerosis, the first FDA approved diagnostic test for vascular inflammation, and the first proven anti-inflammatory treatment for coronary artery disease. He is among the most cited researchers in cardiovascular medicine in the world and has an H-index above 220.

== Early life ==
Ridker was born in St. Louis, Missouri in 1959. He attended Brown University for his undergraduate studies, graduating with a Bachelor of Science in 1981. He attended Harvard Medical School, where he received his MD in 1986; Ridker completed his residency at Brigham and Women’s Hospital and West Roxbury VA Medical Center in Boston, Massachusetts. In 1992, Ridker earned a Master of Public Health degree at the Harvard T.H. Chan School of Public Health.

== Career ==
Ridker’s translational research combines the tools of epidemiology, vascular biology, and randomized clinical trials to determine the root causes of heart disease, stroke, and diabetes. He is responsible for the clinical development of high sensitivity C-reactive protein (hsCRP), a marker of inflammation, that is used to evaluate the risk of heart attack and stroke, and coined the term “residual inflammatory risk” to describe patients who are at risk due to vascular inflammation rather than high cholesterol levels. Early in his career, Ridker recognized that elevated cholesterol levels were absent in almost half of all heart attack victims and that the pro-inflammatory response detected by hsCRP and the central signaling cytokine Interleukin 6 were responsible for a large proportion of “unexplained risk”.

Ridker is best known for his work developing inflammatory biomarkers and his clinical trials defining anti-inflammatory treatments for cardiovascular disease. In 1997, Ridker showed that elevated levels of hsCRP and interleukin-6 in healthy individuals were a major risk marker for future heart attack, stroke, diabetes, and cardiovascular death, independent of traditional risk factors. Between 1998 and 2005, Ridker showed that individuals with elevated hsCRP but low levels of cholesterol were at substantial risk and that statin drugs used to lower cholesterol also lowered hsCRP and thus had important anti-inflammatory properties. This work, largely funded by the National Institutes of Health, eventually led to the design and conduct of the multi-national JUPITER primary prevention trial which in 2008 demonstrated that individuals with elevated hsCRP levels could reduce by half their risk of future heart attack or stroke by taking statin therapy, even if cholesterol levels were already low.

Critical proof of the inflammation hypothesis of atherosclerosis came when Ridker and his international collaborators focused on the NLRP3 to Interleukin-1b to Interleukin-6 pathway of innate immunity and its role in coronary disease. Toward this end, in 2010, Ridker obtained parallel funding from the National Heart Lung and Blood Institute and from the pharmaceutical industry to design and conduct two multi-national cardiovascular inflammation reduction trials known as CANTOS and CIRT. The CANTOS (Canakinumab Anti-inflammatory Thrombosis Outcomes Study) reported in late 2017 that inflammation inhibition with Canakinumab, a monoclonal antibody targeting interleukin-1-beta, can significantly reduce future risks of heart attack, need for expensive coronary revascularization procedures, and cardiovascular deaths among high-risk heart disease patients with residual inflammatory risk. Canakinumab had no effects on either cholesterol or blood pressure, and thus these data provided the fundamental first proof-of-concept for the inflammation hypothesis of atherosclerosis. CANTOS also demonstrated that the magnitude of inflammation reduction, as measured by on-treatment levels of Interleukin-6, drives the cardiovascular benefit with 36% decreases in cardiovascular death and all-cause mortality among robust Canakinumab responders. In contrast, the federally funded CIRT (Cardiovascular Inflammation Reduction Trial) showed no benefit to low-dose Methotrexate but also no evidence of lowering Interleukin-1b, Interleukin-6 nor CRP. Thus, the positive CANTOS trial and the informative null CIRT trial defined the need to reduce signaling from the NLRP3 to Interleukin-1 to Interleukin-6 in order to lower vascular event rates. These findings were replicated with low-dose Colchicine in the 2019 COLCOT and 2020 LoDoCo2 trials. Ongoing work from Ridker’s group is testing whether direct targeting of Interleukin-6 itself can improve cardiovascular outcomes.

Ridker’s work has had wide biologic implications beyond atherosclerosis and heart disease. By reducing inflammation in the tumor microenvironment, CANTOS also demonstrated highly significant reductions in lung cancer and lung cancer fatality. These data have generated broad interest within the academic and pharmacologic communities resulting in multiple trials studying Interleukin-1 inhibition with or without adjunctive checkpoint inhibition as a novel therapy for non small cell lung cancers. Work from CANTOS has also demonstrated the potential human benefits of targeted Interleukin-1 therapy on anemia, renal failure, and large joint osteoarthritis.

In his work as a clinical trialist, Ridker has designed, conducted, and served as Trial Chair of the Steering Committee of PRINCE, VAL-MARC, PREVENT, LANCET, JUPITER, SPIRE-1, SPIRE-2, CANTOS and CIRT, as well as the ongoing PROMINENT, ACTIV-4B, and ZEUS trials.

== Honors and awards ==
- 2020, Elected Member, National Academy of Medicine
- 2013, Distinguished Scientist Award, American Heart Association
- 2012, Elected Member, American Clinical and Climatological Association
- 2009, Doctorem Honoris Causa, Utrecht University, The Netherlands
- 2009, Doctorem Honoris Causa, Interamerican Open University
- 2007, Distinguished Fellow, International Atherosclerosis Society
- 2005, NIH Director’s Astute Clinician Award, National Institutes of Health
- 2004, TIME 100 Most Influential: Scientists & Thinkers
- 2001, TIME, America's Ten Best Researchers in Science and Medicine
- 2002, Elected Fellow, Association of American Physicians
- 2000, Elected Member, American Epidemiological Society
- 1999, Elected Member, American Society for Clinical Investigation
- 1993, Elected Fellow, American College of Cardiology

== See also ==
- JUPITER trial
