= British Doctors Study =

Study (1951 to 2001) into smoking and lung cancer

Survival from age 35 of non-smokers, cigarette smokers and ex-smokers who stopped smoking between 25 and 34 years old

Survival from age 40 of non-smokers, cigarette smokers and ex-smokers who stopped smoking between 35 and 44 years old

Survival from age 50 of non-smokers, cigarette smokers and ex-smokers who stopped smoking between 45 and 54 years old

Survival from age 60 of non-smokers, cigarette smokers and ex-smokers who stopped smoking between 55 and 64 years old

The British Doctors' Study was a prospective cohort study which ran from 1951 to 2001, and in 1956 provided convincing statistical evidence that tobacco smoking increases risk of lung cancer.

== Context ==
Although there had been suspicions of a link between smoking and various diseases, the evidence for this link had been largely circumstantial. In fact, smoking had been advertised as "healthy" for many years, and there had been no clear explanation why rates of lung cancer had soared.

To further investigate the link, the Medical Research Council (MRC) instructed its Statistical Research Unit (later the Oxford-based Clinical Trial Service Unit) to conduct a prospective study into the link. This approach to medical questions was fairly new: in the 1954 "Preliminary report", the researchers felt it necessary to offer a definition of the prospective principle.

The study, when it was published in 1956, heralded a new type of scientific research, showed the relevance of epidemiology and medical statistics in questions of public health, and vitally linked tobacco smoking to a number of serious diseases.

== The study ==
In October 1951, the researchers wrote to all registered physicians in the United Kingdom, and obtained responses in two-thirds, 40,701 of them. No further cohorts were recruited. Because of the limited sample size females were excluded from most analyses and publications focused on the male physicians.

The respondents were stratified into decade of birth, sex and their cause-specific mortality, as well as general physical health and current smoking habits, followed up in further questionnaires in 1957, 1966, 1971, 1978, 1991 and finally in 2001.

An analysis of overall mortality over the course of 50 years included 34,439 male British doctors whose smoking habits were recorded in 1951 and periodically updated, with cause-specific mortality being monitored until 2001.

== Statistical analysis ==
Response rates were quite high, making appropriate statistical analyses possible. The result was, that both lung cancer and "coronary thrombosis" (the then-prevalent term for myocardial infarction, now commonly referred to as "heart attack") occurred markedly more often in smokers.

In the follow-up reports, published every ten years, more information became available.In 2005, an analysis of cancer mortality in the British Doctor cohort reported that deaths from 11 of the 13 cancer types in men classified as caused by smoking by the International Agency for Research on Cancer were significantly related to smoking, and that the limited number of deaths of the remaining two types were still associated with smoking. A major conclusion of the study is, for example, that smoking decreases life span up to 10 years, and that more than 50% of all smokers die of a disease known to be smoking-related, although the excess mortality depends on amount of smoking, specifically, on average, those who smoke until age 30 have no excess mortality, those who smoke until age 40 lose 1 year, those who smoke until 50 lose 4 years, and those who smoke until age 60 lose 7 years.

== Impact and personalities ==
The true impact of the study is difficult to gauge, as smoking was not considered a public health problem in the 1950s, and the appreciation of the problem would only grow in the ensuing decades. Nevertheless, the British Doctors' Study was to provide conclusive evidence of linkage between smoking and lung cancer, myocardial infarction, respiratory disease and other smoking-related illnesses.

The original study was run by Richard Doll and Austin Bradford Hill. Richard Peto joined the team in 1971 and would, with Doll, prepare all subsequent reports for publication. Doll and Peto are both celebrated epidemiologists, and their fame is largely based on their pioneering work in the study mentioned. They would continue their work on other cardiovascular studies, for example the more recent Heart Protection Study.

== See also ==
- Framingham Heart Study
- Scandinavian Simvastatin Survival Study
- Nurses' Health Study
- Smoking in the United Kingdom
- History of cancer
