= Independent safety officer =

An independent safety officer (ISO) is a clinician or researcher who is independent of the clinical study team and helps to monitor a clinical trial for research participant (patient) safety, adverse events, trial progress, and data quality. An ISO has relevant experience with clinical trials as well as with the patient population and intervention being studied. Clinical trials using an ISO are usually smaller, single-site trials with a moderate to minimal risk intervention.

== Need for an ISO ==
Safety surveillance of a clinical trial should be in proportion to the risk and complexity of the trial. Large, multi-site clinical trials are commonly overseen by a Data Monitoring Committee or Data and Safety Monitoring Board (DSMB) consisting of expert clinicians, biostatisticians, and ethicists or patient advocates. Small, minimal risk studies may be monitored by the principal investigator according to the data and safety monitoring plan (DSM plan) approved by the institutional review board (IRB).

For clinical trials with intermediate complexity or risk, the use of an ISO can be very helpful to monitor the trial for research participant safety, adherence to the protocol, and collection of good data. Examples of studies monitored by an ISO might include a trial involving Food and Drug Administration (FDA) approved drugs used in unapproved indications, non-significant risk medical devices, nutritional products used as a drug, research-only interventions such as an insulin clamp, or behavioral interventions with the possibility of psychological adverse events. Monitoring by an ISO may also be appropriate for higher risk single-site studies of short duration, such as pilot studies, for which convening a full DSMB is not feasible.

== Job characteristics ==
An ISO is usually a physician or investigator with experience and training in both the disease and the intervention being studied. This allows the ISO to assess the safety of the research participants throughout the course of the trial. In addition, an ISO has experience with clinical trials so that they can monitor the progress of the trial for adequate enrollment, appropriate follow-up, adherence to protocol, and good data collection. Finally, the ISO is independent of the clinical trial they are monitoring. They are not a part of the study team and have no financial or scientific conflicts of interest with the clinical trial or the principal investigator.

== Responsibilities ==
The DSM plan, which is approved by the IRB before a trial begins, will stipulate the use of an ISO for monitoring. In addition, the specific responsibilities of the ISO for that trial are defined by the ISO charter written by the principal investigator and the ISO. The charter typically sets out the aspects of the trial that will be reviewed, the frequency of data review and written reports, a plan for adverse event identification and reporting, a plan for monitoring of data quality and accuracy, and the criteria for decision-making regarding continuation, modification or termination of individual participants or the clinical trial.

An ISO meets regularly with the principal investigator and study team to review the progress of the trial. In these meetings, the ISO discusses: 1) a review of any adverse safety events; 2) protocol deviations and exclusions; 3) enrollment and follow-up of participants; 4) missing data and data quality controls; 5) any new medical advances that may require changes in the study protocol. The timing of the meetings depends on the risk to the participants as well as the degree of oversight needed for a particular trial.

If a clinical trial has regulatory lapses, excessive adverse events linked to the trial intervention, or fails to recruit adequate numbers of participants, the ISO may recommend that the clinical trial protocol be modified or the trial terminated.

Occasionally, additional expertise beyond the ISO is needed to accomplish a comprehensive review. With additional personnel, this is considered a Safety Committee. Most frequently a biostatistician will be the additional reviewer. Other additions can include a content expert for nonclinical issues, a methodology consultant, or another clinician that has additional specific expertise.
