= Clinical trial portal =

A clinical trial portal (also known as clinical portal or clinical study portal) is a web portal or enterprise portal that primarily serves sponsors and investigators in a clinical trial. Clinical portals can be developed for a particular study, however study-specific portals may be part of larger, clinical sponsor or Contract Research Organization (CRO) portals that cover multiple trials. A clinical portal is typically developed by a sponsor or CRO to facilitate centralized access to relevant information, documentation and online applications by investigational sites participating (or considering participation) in a trial, as well as for the monitors, study managers, data managers, medical, safety and regulatory staff that help plan, conduct, manage and review the trial.

== Clinical trial investigator portal ==
A clinical trial investigator portal (also known as clinical investigator portal) focuses on facilitating sponsors' recruitment and training of investigators and the ongoing exchange of information and completion of documentation with them during the life-cycle of a clinical study. Rather than using postal- or e-mail, documents such as confidentiality agreements, regulatory documents, safety documents, the study protocol and investigator brochure can be made centrally available in a suitably capable portal to all investigators being considered for a trial in an efficient and convenient manner. Several pharmaceutical companies have implemented enterprise-level Clinical Trial Portals and realized reductions study cost and cycle times. Portals have evolved from uni-dimensional communication, pushing information from Sponsor to Sites, to a more multi-directional communication center.

=== Site feasibility and selection ===
A typical Clinical Trial Portal includes a database of clinical research Investigators (doctors who are experienced in conducting clinical research trials). The Investigator Database profiles the experience and capabilities of each Investigator and includes an online survey and ranking application to help study teams select the best Investigator for a given study.

=== Study related documents ===
Sponsors and study sites are required to negotiate and complete a series of regulatory, business and financial documents prior to commencing a clinical trial. The Secure Document Exchange technology of a clinical trial portal facilitates this process online vs by paper and overnight carrier offering significant financial and environmental advantages.

=== Signatures and approvals ===
Electronic and digital signatures can be applied to most document and content types (including training) within a clinical trial portal to reduce cost, timelines, and paper processes.

=== Distribution of safety reports ===
Clinical Trial Portals can facilitate the distribution and tracking of safety reports (MedWatch, CIOMS, etc.) to study sites, IRBs and Ethics Committees in a secure environment. These applications use sophisticated algorithms to ensure the safety reports are distributed to the correct users.

=== Grant negotiation and payment tracking ===
Clinical researchers are paid in the form of "grants" which are processed when certain milestones are achieved. The grants are typically negotiated prior to study start up. Most clinical trial portals include a secure document exchange technology that facilitates the negotiation of these grants as well as an application that tracks the processing of each grant.

=== Study training ===
Training of study teams and site staff is becoming more important as the industry shifts to a more technology-driven environment. Clinical Trial Portals may include an LMS (Learning Management System) to deliver and track on and offline training and certification.

=== Access to EDC and other online applications ===
Clinical Trial Portals can provide a single-sign-on capability using a SAML (Security Assertion Mark-up Language) technology to reduce the number of websites and credentials that are typically required to conduct a clinical trial. Links to other clinical trial technologies being used for a study can be incorporated into the portal to provide users with a common technology platform for the studies they conduct.

=== Reporting ===
Reporting on study and site progress throughout a clinical trial is a critical component of a Clinical Trial Portal for Study Managers and Site Monitors. Reports should be available at the study, country, site and user level and should the assignment/completion of tasks, audit trails on all activity, recruitment/enrollment progress, and other milestone/timeline driven activities. In addition, portals can incorporate data from other clinical trial systems to provide meaningful dashboard and detail level reports that help manage the overall study progress.

=== Patient recruitment and retention ===
Global patient recruitment and retention campaigns are complicated to deploy and track due to the complex submission/approval process that IRBs and ethics committees require on a country-by-country basis. Clinical Trial Portals can include patient recruitment management applications that track actual vs projected enrollment, site recruitment plans, IRB/EC submission/approval dates, recruitment material management, outreach tactics and ROI. As most of the trials suffer by time delays by both patient recruitment issues and patient drop-outs, Trial Portals having the ability to interact with Patients can enhance the patient motivation to stay in a trial.
