= PARAMOUNT trial =

Clinical trial studying non-small-cell lung carcinoma

- text from a representative informed consent document
- other names: PARAMOUNT, NCT00789373
- sponsor: Eli Lilly and Company
- number of participants: 939
- start: November 2008
- end: September 2013
- primary completion: June 2010

The PARAMOUNT trial is a clinical trial studying non-small-cell lung carcinoma (NSCLC). The trial was sponsored by Eli Lilly and Company and was conducted in several European countries and Canada. It was registered in November 2008 and was projected to end in September 2013.

PARAMOUNT found that maintenance therapy with pemetrexed for patients with advanced non-squamous NSCLC was an effective and well-tolerated treatment option in those patients who had not had progress after initial therapy with pemetrexed plus cisplatin.

== Study design ==
=== Name ===
The full name of the trial is "A Phase 3, Double-Blind, Placebo-Controlled Study of Maintenance Pemetrexed plus Best Supportive Care versus Best Supportive Care Immediately Following Induction Treatment with Pemetrexed + Cisplatin for Advanced Non-Squamous Non-Small Cell Lung Cancer". Its common name is PARAMOUNT. Its ClinicalTrials.gov identifier is NCT00789373.

=== Purpose ===
The PARAMOUNT trial investigated whether treatment with a maintenance dose of pemetrexed would inhibit the growth of non-small-cell lung carcinoma and improve survival rates after first-line therapy with pemetrexed plus cisplatin.

For patients with advanced non-small cell lung carcinoma (NSCLC), maintenance therapy is sometimes used when the initial chemotherapy does not lead to improvement. An alternative would be administering a second chemotherapy if the disease progresses. A significant number of patients do not survive long enough for a second treatment if their disease progresses. When maintenance therapy is used it may or may not consist of a different drug than the initial chemotherapy.

Studies prior to PARAMOUNT had shown pemetrexed, an antifolate, had been an effective therapy for patients with NSCLC when used either as an initial chemotherapy with cisplatin or as a maintenance drug when not part of the initial therapy. The PARAMOUNT study was designed to measure the extent of the efficacy when a patient received pemetrexed maintenance therapy after cisplatin/pemetrexed initial therapy. The study would measure progression-free survival of patients and survival irrespective of whether the cancer had progressed. An additional study goal would be to check the extent to which measurement of thymidylate synthase - the naturally produced enzyme on which pemetrexed acts - could predict the efficacy of pemetrexed in these cases.

=== Outcome ===
PARAMOUNT found that maintenance therapy with pemetrexed for patients with advanced non-squamous NSCLC was an effective and well tolerated treatment option in those patients who had not had progress after initial therapy with pemetrexed plus cisplatin. The average life of all participants receiving the experimental treatment increased more than 13 months as compared to the control group. The results of this trial should not be generalized beyond the scope of the research and the trial design must be considered to interpret these results.

The result of this trial did not change the fact that the concept of maintenance therapy remains controversial and complicated.

== Study participants ==
Illustration of the lungs

The study intended to enroll 939 people. The study started in November 2008 and was estimated to be completed in September 2013. The study was conducted at locations in Australia, Belgium, Finland, France, Germany, Greece, India, Italy, the Netherlands, Poland, Portugal, Romania, Spain, Turkey, and the United Kingdom.

Among other inclusion and exclusion criteria, participants must in the trial must have stage IIIB or IV nonsquamous non-small-cell lung carcinoma and have at least one measurable tumor lesion by Response Evaluation Criteria in Solid Tumors guidelines or disease which can be examined by a CT scan, but must not have non-superficial squamous-cell carcinoma or a mixture of both small-cell carcinoma and non-small-cell lung carcinoma or have had another form of cancer other than superficial basal-cell carcinoma and superficial squamous-cell carcinoma, or carcinoma in situ of the cervix within the last 5 years. Patients with a history of low-grade (Gleason Grading System score equal to or less than 6) localized prostate cancer are eligible.
