= AIM-HIGH (trial) =

Pharmaceutical clinical trial

AIM-HIGH trial
- Study type: randomized controlled trial
- Locations: 92 centers US and Canada
- Funding: NHLBI, Abbott Laboratories, Merck
- Published: 2011
- Article: AIM-HIGH Investigators; Boden, W. E.; Probstfield, J. L.; Anderson, T.; Chaitman, B. R.; Desvignes-Nickens, P.; Koprowicz, K.; McBride, R.; Teo, K.; Weintraub, W. (15 December 2011). "Niacin in Patients with Low HDL Cholesterol Levels Receiving Intensive Statin Therapy". New England Journal of Medicine. 365 (24): 2255–2267. doi:10.1056/NEJMoa1107579. PMID 22085343.

Atherothrombosis Intervention in Metabolic Syndrome with Low HDL/High Triglycerides: Impact on Global Health Outcomes (also known as AIM-HIGH) was a randomized control trial designed to assess the efficacy of niacin (extended-release) added to statin therapy in reducing cardiovascular events in patients with established atherosclerotic cardiovascular disease (ASCVD). These patients had well-controlled low-density lipoprotein (LDL) cholesterol but persistently low high-density lipoprotein (HDL) cholesterol and elevated triglycerides. 3,414 patients with established ASCVD were enrolled. The mean follow-up period was three years. The trial was stopped early due to a lack of efficacy and a trend towards an increase in the incidence of ischemic stroke.

== Background ==
Low HDL cholesterol and high triglycerides are recognized risk factors for cardiovascular disease, even in individuals with well-controlled LDL cholesterol. Niacin has been shown to increase HDL cholesterol and lower triglycerides, prompting an investigation into whether adding niacin to statin therapy could further reduce cardiovascular risk in this patient population.

== Study design ==
AIM-HIGH was a multicenter, randomized, double-blind, placebo-controlled trial sponsored by the National Heart, Lung, and Blood Institute (NHLBI). Additional funding and support was provided by Abbott Laboratories and Merck. The study enrolled 3,414 patients with established ASCVD and dyslipidemia, characterized by low HDL cholesterol (<40 mg/dL for men and <50 mg/dL for women) and elevated triglycerides (150–400 mg/dL). All participants were already on statin therapy to maintain LDL cholesterol levels between 40 and 80 mg/dL. Participants were randomly assigned to receive either extended-release niacin (1500–2000 mg daily) or a matching placebo. The primary endpoint was the time to first major cardiovascular event, including nonfatal myocardial infarction, ischemic stroke, hospitalization for acute coronary syndrome, or death from coronary heart disease. Secondary endpoints were death from coronary heart disease (CHD), nonfatal myocardial infarction, ischemic stroke, or hospitalization for acute coronary syndrome (ACS).

== Key findings ==
The results of the AIM-HIGH trial, published in 2011, showed that adding niacin to statin therapy did not significantly reduce the risk of cardiovascular events compared to statin therapy alone:

- Primary Endpoint: There was no significant difference in the incidence of major cardiovascular events between the niacin and placebo groups (16.4% vs. 16.2%).
- HDL and Triglyceride Levels: While niacin effectively increased HDL cholesterol levels and reduced triglycerides, these changes did not translate into a reduction in cardiovascular events.
- Safety Concerns: The study was halted prematurely due to lack of efficacy and a slight, non-significant increase in the incidence of ischemic stroke in the niacin group, raising concerns about the safety profile of niacin in this context.

== Clinical implications ==
The findings of the AIM-HIGH trial had significant implications for the treatment of dyslipidemia in patients with established ASCVD:

- Reevaluation of Niacin Therapy: The results led to a reevaluation of the role of niacin in combination with statins for cardiovascular risk reduction. Niacin is no longer routinely recommended for patients with well-controlled LDL cholesterol on statin therapy.
- Focus on LDL Cholesterol: The study reinforced the importance of targeting LDL cholesterol as the primary lipid-lowering strategy for reducing cardiovascular risk.

== Long-term impact ==
AIM-HIGH contributed to a shift in clinical practice guidelines, emphasizing the limited additional benefit of niacin in patients with low HDL cholesterol and high triglycerides already receiving effective statin therapy. Subsequent guidelines have focused on intensifying statin therapy or considering other agents for specific lipid abnormalities rather than adding niacin.
