= HDL-Atherosclerosis Treatment Study =

Pharmaceutical clinical trial

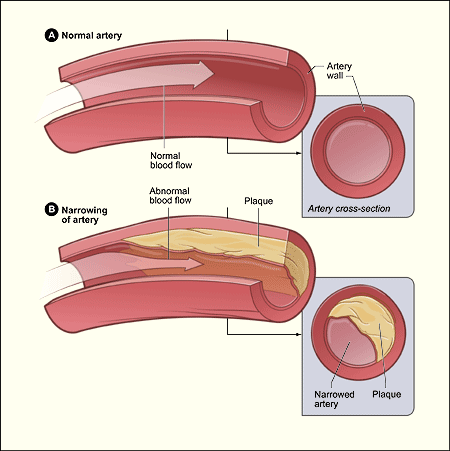
Atherosclerosis causes plaque buildup and eventual occlusion of vessels

The HDL-Atherosclerosis Treatment Study, also known as HATS, was a three-year double-blind trial involving 160 people with coronary heart disease (CHD) who had a low high density lipoprotein (HDL) and near normal low-density lipoprotein (LDL). The study compared a combination of simvastatin and niacin with antioxidant vitamin therapy. Using angiography, coronary artery stenosis progressed when using placebo or antioxidant alone, and regressed with the combination of simvastatin and niacin. The study demonstrated a 90% reduction in CHD death, nonfatal heart attacks, stroke, or revascularization for worsening angina. It was published in 2001.

== Objective ==
Cardiovascular death is one of the leading cause of death worldwide. Lipid modifying therapy and antioxidants are thought to improve patient outcomes in the treatment of this deadly disease.

The HATS study was an example of the efforts undertaken to analyze the impact of CHD, a placebo controlled double blind trial enrolled 160 patients with coronary disease, low HDL cholesterol levels, and normal low-density lipoprotein (LDL) cholesterol levels in order to assess the impact of simvastatin, niacin, and antioxidants in the prevention of coronary disease.

== Study details ==
The HATS study enrolled 160 patients with preexising coronary disease and with evidence of stenosis in the coronary vessels. Potential participants were excluded based on strict criteria such as previous history of coronary bypass surgery, severe hypertension, uncontrolled diabetes, and were stratified based on sex, triglyceride levels, and level of risk. The participants were then subsequently randomly assigned and enrolled to receive one of the following 4 treatment regimens: simvastatin plus niacin, antioxidants, simvastatin–niacin plus antioxidants, or placebos. The antioxidants included vitamin E, vitamin C, beta-carotene, and selenium.

During the treatment phase, clinic visits took place monthly for the first five visits and then bimonthly until angiography was performed at three years. During this time, patients were also counseled on exercise, smoking cessation, and healthy dietary habits to raise the HDL level. The data was measured by recording fasting plasma levels of triglycerides, and total HDL and LDL levels every four months. In practice, the study carried for a period of 3 years.

== Results ==
After 3 years, compared to the group that was given placebo, the simvastatin-niacin group demonstrated a 42% (p<0.001) reduction in LDL and a 26% (p<0.001) increase in HDL. Similar results were noted when antioxidants were added to this regimen. The average stenosis in the placebo group progressed by 3.9%, 1.8% in the antioxidant group, 0.7% in the simvastatin-niacin plus antioxidant, and regressed by 0.4% in the simvastatin-niacin alone group. Adverse cardiovascular events occurred in 24% in placebo group, 21% in the antioxidant group, 14% in the simvastatin-niacin plus antioxidant group, and 3% in the simvastatin-niacin alone group.

== Conclusion ==
The simvastatin-niacin alone group showed significant clinical and angiographic benefits in patients with CAD and low HDL levels. Proximal coronary stenosis also regressed slightly, and the rate of adverse cardiovascular events was 90 percent lower than that of the placebo group. Surprisingly, adding antioxidants did not add any additional benefit. Across all treatment groups, there was a reduction in average coronary stenosis and adverse cardiovascular events.

== See also ==
- Heart Protection Study
- Scandinavian Simvastatin Survival Study
