= RALES (trial) =

Pharmaceutical clinical trial

Randomized Aldactone Evaluation Study
- Study type: randomized controlled trial
- Published: 1999
- Article: Pitt, Bertram; et al. (2 September 1999). "The Effect of Spironolactone on Morbidity and Mortality in Patients with Severe Heart Failure". New England Journal of Medicine. 341 (10): 709–717. doi:10.1056/NEJM199909023411001. PMID 10471456.

The Randomized Aldactone Evaluation Study (RALES) trial was a landmark clinical study that assessed the impact of spironolactone, an aldosterone antagonist, on morbidity and mortality in patients with severe heart failure due to systolic dysfunction. The findings from this trial significantly influenced the treatment guidelines for heart failure.

== Background ==
Heart failure, particularly heart failure with reduced ejection fraction (HFrEF), is a major cause of morbidity and mortality worldwide. Aldosterone, a hormone that promotes sodium retention and potassium excretion, plays a significant role in the pathophysiology of heart failure by contributing to fluid overload, myocardial fibrosis, and vascular damage. Spironolactone, a potassium-sparing diuretic and aldosterone antagonist, was hypothesized to improve outcomes in patients with severe heart failure.

== Study design ==
RALES trial was a randomized, double-blind, placebo-controlled trial that enrolled 1663 patients from 195 centers in 15 countries from March 1995 to December 1996. The average age of the patients was 65 years. Patients were eligible for enrollment if they had recently been diagnosed with severe heart failure (NYHA class III or IV) and a left ventricular ejection fraction (LVEF) of 35% or less, who were already receiving standard therapy (ACE inhibitors, loop diuretics, and, if tolerated, digoxin). The objective of this trial was to assess the impact of spironolactone on morbidity and mortality in patients with severe heart failure. Patients were randomized to receive either spironolactone (25 to 50 mg) daily or placebo. Both groups were continued on standard therapy. The primary endpoint was all-cause mortality. Secondary endpoints included hospitalization for heart failure, changes in symptoms of heart failure, and serum potassium levels.

== Key findings ==
The trial was stopped early because the beneficial effect of spironolactone on all-cause death exceeded the prespecified discontinuation requirements. Spironolactone reduced the risk of death by 30% compared to placebo. Additionally, there was a 35% reduction in the risk of hospitalization for worsening heart failure in the spironolactone group. Finally, patients treated with spironolactone reported significant improvements in heart failure symptoms. Hyperkalemia (high blood potassium) was more common in the spironolactone group, but the incidence of severe hyperkalemia was relatively low. Gynecomastia or breast pain occurred in 10% of men treated with spironolactone vs 1% of men in the placebo group, otherwise there were no other differences in safety or adverse events.

== Clinical implications ==
The RALES trial had a profound impact on the management of heart failure. The results led to the inclusion of aldosterone antagonists, such as spironolactone, in treatment guidelines for patients with severe heart failure. Spironolactone has become a standard therapy for reducing mortality and morbidity in patients with severe heart failure with reduced ejection fraction. The RALES trial has then paved the way for further studies on the role of aldosterone antagonists in heart failure and other cardiovascular conditions.

== Conclusion ==
The RALES trial established spironolactone as a vital component of therapy for patients with severe heart failure, demonstrating significant reductions in mortality and hospitalization and improvements in symptoms. The trial's findings have been instrumental in shaping current heart failure treatment guidelines and improving patient outcomes.
