= PROVE-IT TIMI 22 =

Pharmaceutical clinical trial

Pravastatin or Atorvastatin Evaluation and Infection Therapy–Thrombolysis in Myocardial Infarction 22 trial (PROVE-IT TIMI 22)
- Study type: Double-blind randomised controlled trial
- Dates: November 2000 to December 2001
- Locations: Australia, Europe, and North America
- Published: 2004

The Pravastatin or Atorvastatin Evaluation and Infection Therapy–Thrombolysis in Myocardial Infarction 22 trial, also known as PROVE-IT TIMI 22, was a randomized, double-blind, clinical trial that recruited 4,162 people admitted within 10 days of an acute coronary event and randomised them to the lipid-lowering drugs pravastatin (40 mg) or atorvastatin (80 mg) and a 10-day course of the antibiotic gatifloxacin or placebo. The participants enrolled at 349 sites across Australia, Europe, and North America between November 2000 and December 2001, and the study concluded that statin treatment for secondary prevention reduced coronary heart disease (CHD) events and that atorvastatin had a more marked effect than pravastatin. The study was published in The New England Journal of Medicine and reported at the American College of Cardiology Annual Scientific Session in 2004.

== See also ==
- Heart Protection Study (HPS)
- Scandinavian Simvastatin Survival Study (4S)
- West of Scotland Coronary Prevention Study (WOSCOPS)
