= JUPITER trial =

Pharmaceutical clinical trial

Justification for the Use of Statins in Primary Prevention: An Intervention Trial Evaluating Rosuvastatin trial
- Study type: Randomized double-blind placebo-controlled study
- Dates: 2003-2008
- Locations: 1315 sites in 26 countries
- Lead researcher: Paul Ridker
- Funding: AstraZeneca
- Published: 2008
- Article: Ridker PM, Danielson E, Fonseca FA, et al.Ridker PM, Danielson E, Fonseca FA, et al. (November 2008). "Rosuvastatin to prevent vascular events in men and women with elevated C-reactive protein". N. Engl. J. Med. 359 (21): 2195–207. doi:10.1056/NEJMoa0807646. PMID 18997196.

The JUPITER trial (Justification for the Use of Statins in Primary Prevention: An Intervention Trial Evaluating Rosuvastatin) was a clinical trial aimed at evaluating whether statins reduce heart attacks and strokes in people with normal cholesterol levels.

== Study rationale ==
JUPITER was a randomized double-blind placebo-controlled study investigating the use of rosuvastatin in the primary prevention of cardiovascular disease. The trial focused on patients with normal low-density lipoprotein (LDL) cholesterol levels but increased levels of high-sensitivity C-reactive protein (hs-CRP). JUPITER was the first clinical trial to indicate that statin therapy may provide benefit to patients with low-to-normal LDL levels and no known cardiovascular disease. The trial, which began in 2003, was directed by Paul Ridker of Brigham and Women's Hospital.

Because half of all vascular events occur in patients with normal or low levels of LDL cholesterol, JUPITER was designed to determine whether hs-CRP testing could identify these patients, and whether statin therapy could prevent cardiovascular events among them. Elevated hs-CRP levels are thought to be a biomarker of inflammation, and have been associated with an increased risk of myocardial infarction, stroke, peripheral arterial disease, and sudden cardiac death.

== Study details ==
The trial analyzed 17,802 patients without evidence of heart disease but with high CRP levels. In 2008, results presented at the American Heart Association meeting and published in the New England Journal of Medicine (NEJM) found that patients with low-to-normal LDL cholesterol receiving rosuvastatin had a lower rate of major cardiovascular events. Compared to patients taking a placebo, patients given rosuvastatin had reductions in LDL and CRP levels, and a reduction of 0.2% to 0.6% in their absolute risk of heart attack, stroke, and death at one year. The study's authors estimated that the number needed to treat with rosuvastatin to prevent one cardiovascular event was 95 over two years, extrapolated to 25 over five years. The trial was stopped early, after just 1.9 years median duration, by the study's Independent Data Monitoring Board, because the interim results met the study's predefined stopping criteria (it had been predetermined that it would be unethical to continue the study once it became clear that the patients in one arm of the study had a significantly higher cardiovascular risk than the other arm's patients).

The trial was sponsored by AstraZeneca, the marketer of Crestor (rosuvastatin). The company saw an increase in its share of the U.S. statin drug market following the November 2008 NEJM publication.

=== Adverse events ===
Reports of serious adverse events within JUPITER were equally distributed between the study's rosuvastatin and placebo arms. There were no significant differences between the treatment groups with respect to muscle pain, muscle weakness, hepatic function, or renal function; however, the researchers noted small but statistically significant increases in the rate of physician-reported diabetes and glycated hemoglobin values in the rosuvastatin group, an effect that has also been seen in studies with other statins. Those latter findings, along with concerns over the safety of very low LDL levels, rosuvastatin's higher cost compared to generic statins, and the validity of biomarkers used in the diagnosis of cardiovascular disease, have been cited by those urging caution before expanding indications for statin treatment.

== Criticism of the trial ==
In 2010, Dr. Michel de Lorgeril, et al., published "a critical reappraisal" of the JUPITER Trial in the Archives of Internal Medicine. The article's authors critiqued what they saw as flaws in the trial, pointing out that the cardiovascular mortality rate and the case-fatality rate for myocardial infarction were much lower than they expected. They also raised concerns about conflict of interest in the trial design and leadership: nine of 14 authors of the main report had financial ties to the sponsor, AstraZeneca, and the lead investigator held the patent for the C-reactive protein test, whose use in screening would be promoted by the results as reported. They also argued that the trial's premature termination may have distorted the results, and raised concerns that AstraZeneca scientists had controlled and managed the raw data. They concluded that, "The results of the trial do not support the use of statin treatment for primary prevention of cardiovascular diseases and raise troubling questions concerning the role of commercial sponsors."

In addition, some prior and some subsequent studies have contrasted with the JUPITER trial results. On the role of C-reactive protein, a 2009 study employing Mendelian randomization, published in the Journal of the American Medical Association suggested that CRP does not play a causal role in cardiovascular disease; the results may argue against CRP's use as a marker of cardiovascular disease risk or for identifying subjects for statin therapy as in JUPITER, and more strongly argue against using CRP as a therapeutic target per se. The discordant results of this subsequent study provoked debate over the role and value of CRP as a biomarker and possible therapeutic target in heart disease.
