= Clinical trial =

Phase of clinical research in medicine

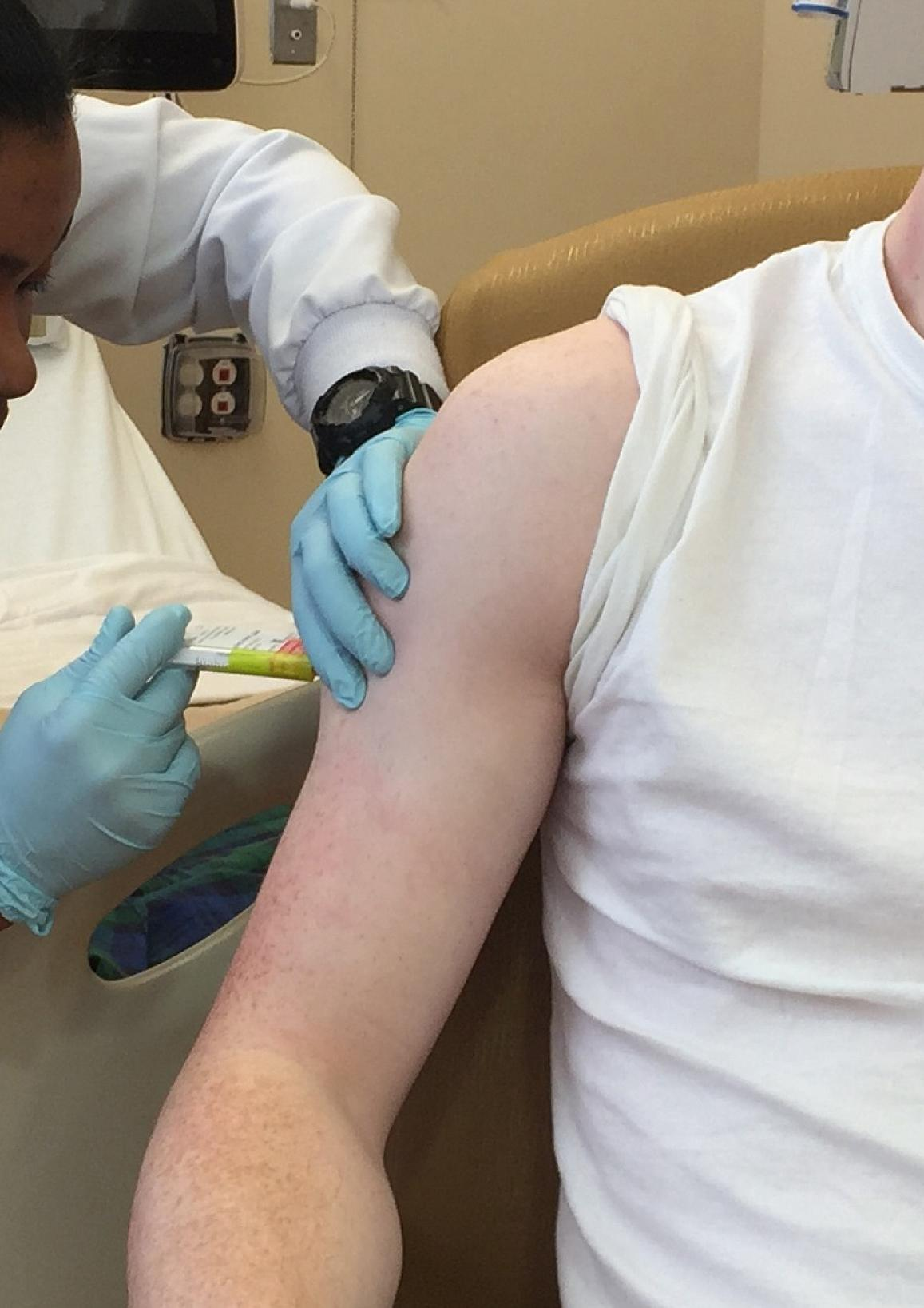
A clinical trial participant receives an injection.

Clinical trials are prospective biomedical or behavioral research studies on human participants designed to answer specific questions about biomedical or behavioral interventions, including new treatments (such as novel vaccines, drugs, dietary choices, dietary supplements, and medical devices) and known interventions that warrant further study and comparison. Clinical trials generate data on dosage, safety and efficacy. They are conducted only after they have received health authority/ethics committee approval in the country where approval of the therapy is sought. These authorities are responsible for vetting the risk/benefit ratio of the trial—their approval does not mean the therapy is "safe" or effective, only that the trial may be conducted.

Depending on product type and development stage, investigators initially enroll volunteers or patients into small pilot studies, and subsequently conduct progressively larger scale comparative studies. Clinical trials can vary in size and cost, and they can involve a single research center or multiple centers, in one country or in multiple countries. Clinical study design aims to ensure the scientific validity and reproducibility of the results.

Costs for clinical trials can range into the billions of dollars per approved drug, and the complete trial process to approval may require 7–15 years. The sponsor may be a governmental organization or a pharmaceutical, biotechnology or medical-device company. Certain functions necessary to the trial, such as monitoring and lab work, may be managed by an outsourced partner, such as a contract research organization or a central laboratory. Only 10 percent of all drugs started in human clinical trials become approved drugs. Data collection is a key activity within clinical trials and digital data collection tools can assist greatly in this effort.

== Overview ==
Number of clinical trials

=== Trials of drugs ===
Some clinical trials involve healthy subjects with no pre-existing medical conditions. Other clinical trials pertain to people with specific health conditions who are willing to try an experimental treatment. Pilot experiments are conducted to gain insights for design of the clinical trial to follow.

There are two goals to testing medical treatments: to learn whether they work well enough, called "efficacy", or "effectiveness"; and to learn whether they are safe enough, called "safety". Neither is an absolute criterion; both safety and efficacy are evaluated relative to how the treatment is intended to be used, what other treatments are available, and the severity of the disease or condition. The benefits must outweigh the risks. For example, many drugs to treat cancer have severe side effects that would not be acceptable for an over-the-counter pain medication, yet the cancer drugs have been approved since they are used under a physician's care and are used for a life-threatening condition.

In the US the elderly constitute 14% of the population, while they consume over one-third of drugs. People over 55 (or a similar cutoff age) are often excluded from trials because their greater health issues and drug use complicate data interpretation, and because they have different physiological capacity than younger people. Children and people with unrelated medical conditions are also frequently excluded. Pregnant women are often excluded due to potential risks to the fetus.

The sponsor designs the trial in coordination with a panel of expert clinical investigators, including what alternative or existing treatments to compare to the new drug and what type(s) of patients might benefit. If the sponsor cannot obtain enough test subjects at one location investigators at other locations are recruited to join the study.

During the trial, investigators recruit subjects with the predetermined characteristics, administer the treatment(s) and collect data on the subjects' health for a defined time period. Data include measurements such as vital signs, concentration of the study drug in the blood or tissues, changes to symptoms, and whether improvement or worsening of the condition targeted by the study drug occurs. The researchers send the data to the trial sponsor, who then analyzes the pooled data using statistical tests.

Examples of clinical trial goals include assessing the safety and relative effectiveness of a medication or device:

- On a specific kind of patient
- At varying dosages
- For a new indication
- Evaluation for improved efficacy in treating a condition as compared to the standard therapy for that condition
- Evaluation of the study drug or device relative to two or more already approved/common interventions for that condition

While most clinical trials test one alternative to the novel intervention, some expand to three or four and may include a placebo.

Except for small, single-location trials, the design and objectives are specified in a document called a clinical trial protocol. The protocol is the trial's "operating manual" and ensures all researchers perform the trial in the same way on similar subjects and that the data is comparable across all subjects. In 2025 the SPIRIT group released 'SPIRIT 2025', an updated guideline for trial protocols that provides a 34-item minimum checklist, adds a new open-science section, strengthens guidance on reporting harms and intervention/comparator descriptions, and includes a new item on patient and public involvement

As a trial is designed to test hypotheses and rigorously monitor and assess outcomes, it can be seen as an application of the scientific method, specifically the experimental step.

The most common clinical trials evaluate new pharmaceutical products, medical devices, biologics, diagnostic assays, psychological therapies, or other interventions. Clinical trials may be required before a national regulatory authority approves marketing of the innovation.

=== Trials of devices ===
Similarly to drugs, manufacturers of medical devices in the United States are required to conduct clinical trials for premarket approval. Device trials may compare a new device to an established therapy, or may compare similar devices to each other. An example of the former in the field of vascular surgery is the Open versus Endovascular Repair (OVER trial) for the treatment of abdominal aortic aneurysm, which compared the older open aortic repair technique to the newer endovascular aneurysm repair device. An example of the latter are clinical trials on mechanical devices used in the management of adult female urinary incontinence.

=== Trials of procedures ===
Similarly to drugs, medical or surgical procedures may be subjected to clinical trials, such as comparing different surgical approaches in treatment of fibroids for subfertility. However, when clinical trials are unethical or logistically impossible in the surgical setting, case-controlled studies will be replaced.

=== Patient and public involvement ===
Besides being participants in a clinical trial, members of the public can be actively collaborate with researchers in designing and conducting clinical research. This is known as patient and public involvement (PPI). Public involvement involves a working partnership between patients, caregivers, people with lived experience, and researchers to shape and influence what is researched and how. PPI can improve the quality of research and make it more relevant and accessible. People with current or past experience of illness can provide a different perspective than professionals and compliment their knowledge. Through their personal knowledge they can identify research topics that are relevant and important to those living with an illness or using a service. They can also help to make the research more grounded in the needs of the specific communities they are part of. Public contributors can also ensure that the research is presented in plain language that is clear to the wider society and the specific groups it is most relevant for.

== History ==
=== Development ===
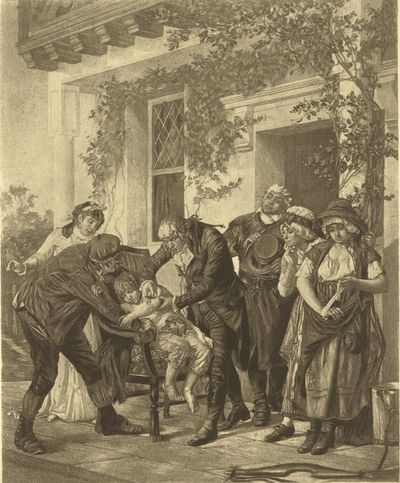
Edward Jenner vaccinating James Phipps, a boy of eight, on 14 May 1796. Jenner failed to use a control group.

Although early medical experimentation was performed often, the use of a control group to provide an accurate comparison for the demonstration of the intervention's efficacy was generally lacking. For instance, Lady Mary Wortley Montagu, who campaigned for the introduction of inoculation (then called variolation) to prevent smallpox, arranged for seven prisoners who had been sentenced to death to undergo variolation in exchange for their life. Although they survived and did not contract smallpox, there was no control group to assess whether this result was due to the inoculation or some other factor. Similar experiments performed by Edward Jenner over his smallpox vaccine were equally conceptually flawed.

The first proper clinical trial was conducted by the Scottish physician James Lind. The disease scurvy, now known to be caused by a Vitamin C deficiency, would often have terrible effects on the welfare of the crew of long-distance ocean voyages. In 1740, the catastrophic result of Anson's circumnavigation attracted much attention in Europe; out of 1900 men, 1400 had died, most of them allegedly from having contracted scurvy. John Woodall, an English military surgeon of the British East India Company, had recommended the consumption of citrus fruit from the 17th century, but their use did not become widespread.

Lind conducted the first systematic clinical trial in 1747. He included a dietary supplement of an acidic quality in the experiment after two months at sea, when the ship was already afflicted with scurvy. He divided twelve scorbutic sailors into six groups of two. They all received the same diet but, in addition, group one was given a quart of cider daily, group two twenty-five drops of elixir of vitriol (sulfuric acid), group three six spoonfuls of vinegar, group four half a pint of seawater, group five received two oranges and one lemon, and the last group a spicy paste plus a drink of barley water. The treatment of group five stopped after six days when they ran out of fruit, but by then one sailor was fit for duty while the other had almost recovered. Apart from that, only group one also showed some effect of its treatment. Each year, May 20 is celebrated as Clinical Trials Day in honor of Lind's research.

After 1750 the discipline began to take its modern shape. The English doctor John Haygarth demonstrated the importance of a control group for the correct identification of the placebo effect in his celebrated study of the ineffective remedy called Perkin's tractors. This was followed in 1843 by a proposal from Irish doctor James Henry for a controlled trial of cold-water therapy vs sulphur for scabies treatment. Further work on the placebo effect was carried out by the eminent physician Sir William Gull, 1st Baronet in the 1860s.

Frederick Akbar Mahomed (d. 1884), who worked at Guy's Hospital in London, made substantial contributions to the process of clinical trials, where "he separated chronic nephritis with secondary hypertension from what we now term essential hypertension. He also founded the Collective Investigation Record for the British Medical Association; this organization collected data from physicians practicing outside the hospital setting and was the precursor of modern collaborative clinical trials."

=== Modern trials ===
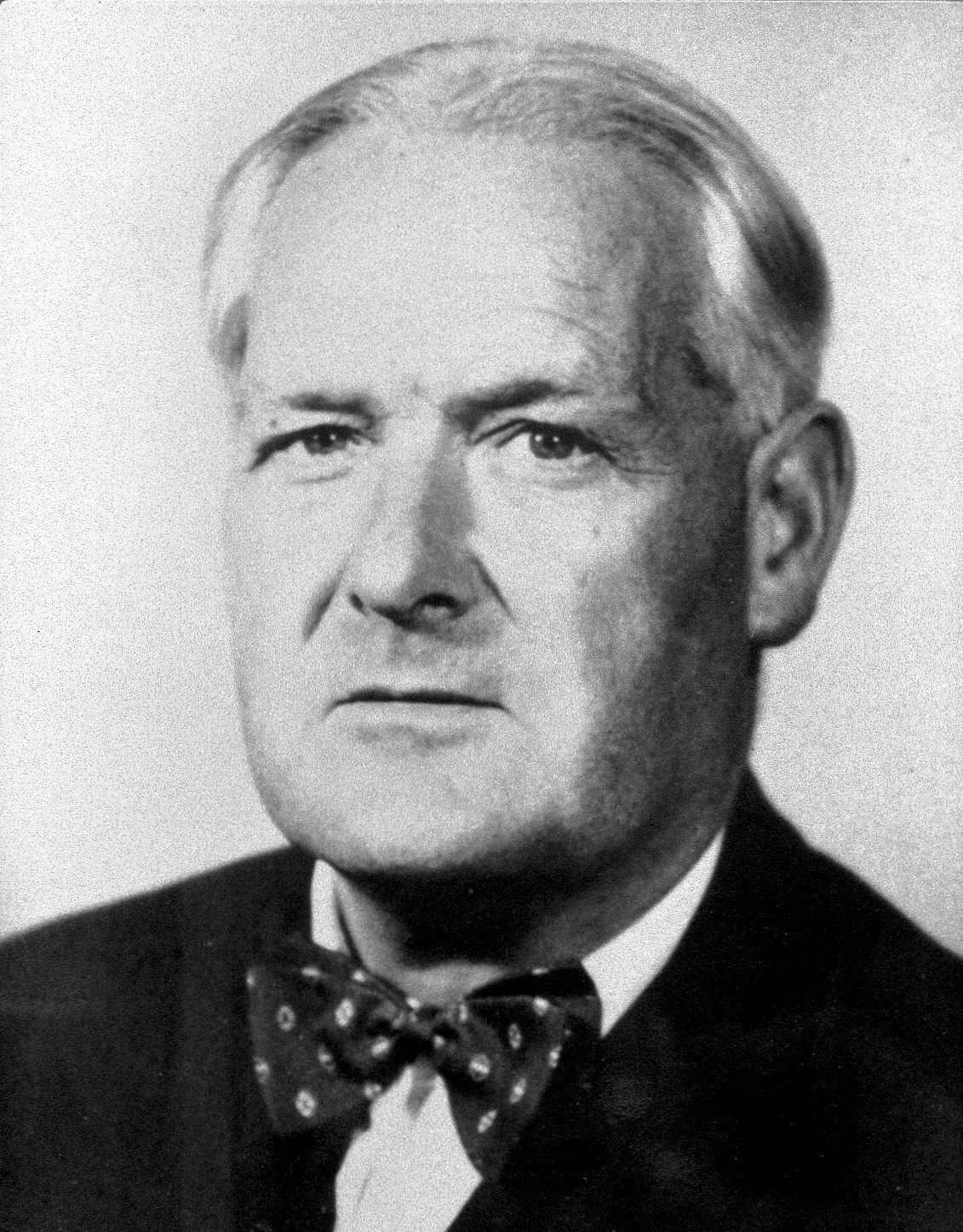
Austin Bradford Hill was a pivotal figure in the modern development of clinical trials.

Ideas of Sir Ronald A. Fisher still play a role in clinical trials. While working for the Rothamsted experimental station in the field of agriculture, Fisher developed his Principles of experimental design in the 1920s as an accurate methodology for the proper design of experiments. Among his major ideas include the importance of randomization—the random assignment of individual elements (eg crops or patients) to different groups for the experiment; replication—to reduce uncertainty, measurements should be repeated and experiments replicated to identify sources of variation; blocking—to arrange experimental units into groups of units that are similar to each other, and thus reducing irrelevant sources of variation; use of factorial experiments—efficient at evaluating the effects and possible interactions of several independent factors. Of these, blocking and factorial design are seldom applied in clinical trials, because the experimental units are human subjects and there is typically only one independent intervention: the treatment.

The British Medical Research Council officially recognized the importance of clinical trials from the 1930s. The council established the Therapeutic Trials Committee to advise and assist in the arrangement of properly controlled clinical trials on new products that seem likely on experimental grounds to have value in the treatment of disease.

The first randomised curative trial was carried out at the MRC Tuberculosis Research Unit by Sir Geoffrey Marshall (1887–1982). The trial, carried out between 1946 and 1947, aimed to test the efficacy of the chemical streptomycin for curing pulmonary tuberculosis. The trial was both double-blind and placebo-controlled.

The methodology of clinical trials was further developed by Sir Austin Bradford Hill, who had been involved in the streptomycin trials. From the 1920s, Hill applied statistics to medicine, attending the lectures of renowned mathematician Karl Pearson, among others. He became famous for a landmark study carried out in collaboration with Richard Doll on the correlation between smoking and lung cancer. They carried out a case-control study in 1950, which compared lung cancer patients with matched control and also began a sustained long-term prospective study into the broader issue of smoking and health, which involved studying the smoking habits and health of more than 30,000 doctors over a period of several years. His certificate for election to the Royal Society called him "the leader in the development in medicine of the precise experimental methods now used nationally and internationally in the evaluation of new therapeutic and prophylactic agents".

The ethics of selecting clinical trial subjects have been controversial for much of their modern history, especially in the United States. From the 1950s up until the early 1970s, the vast majority of pharmaceutical testing in America was performed on prison populations; only after widespread abuse during testing was reported at the Holmesburg Prison did research diminish in these areas. Most of the rest of the world excluded prisoners as potential research subjects following formulation of the Nuremberg Code, based on its assertion that acceptable experimental subjects must be "so situated as to be able to exercise free power of choice". Despite regulations that limit circumstances where inclusion of vulnerable populations in clinical trials is permitted, such groups, such the economically disadvantaged, continue to be made part of research through coercive means as recently as 2015.

International clinical trials day is celebrated on 20 May.

The acronyms used in the titling of clinical trials are often contrived, and have been the subject of derision.

== Types ==
Clinical trials are classified by the research objective created by the investigators.

- In an observational study, the investigators observe the subjects and measure their outcomes. The researchers do not actively manage the study.
- In an interventional study, the investigators give the research subjects an experimental drug, surgical procedure, use of a medical device, diagnostic or other intervention to compare the treated subjects with those receiving no treatment or the standard treatment. Then the researchers assess how the subjects' health changes.

Trials are classified by their purpose. After approval for human research is granted to the trial sponsor, the US Food and Drug Administration (FDA) organizes and monitors the results of trials according to type:

- Prevention trials look for ways to prevent disease in people who have never had the disease or to prevent a disease from returning. These approaches may include drugs, vitamins or other micronutrients, vaccines, or lifestyle changes.
- Screening trials test for ways to identify certain diseases or health conditions.
- Diagnostic trials are conducted to find better tests or procedures for diagnosing a particular disease or condition.
- Treatment trials test experimental drugs, new combinations of drugs, or new approaches to surgery or radiation therapy.
- Quality of life trials (supportive care trials) evaluate how to improve comfort and quality of care for people with a chronic illness.
- Genetic trials are conducted to assess the prediction accuracy of genetic disorders making a person more or less likely to develop a disease.
- Epidemiological trials have the goal of identifying the general causes, patterns or control of diseases in large numbers of people.
- Compassionate use trials or expanded access trials provide partially tested, unapproved therapeutics to a small number of patients who have no other realistic options. Usually, this involves a disease for which no effective therapy has been approved, or a patient who has already failed all standard treatments and whose health is too compromised to qualify for participation in randomized clinical trials. Usually, case-by-case approval must be granted by both the FDA and the pharmaceutical company for such exceptions.
- Fixed trials consider existing data only during the trial's design, do not modify the trial after it begins, and do not assess the results until the study is completed.
- Adaptive clinical trials use existing data to design the trial, and then use interim results to modify the trial as it proceeds. Modifications include dosage, sample size, drug undergoing trial, patient selection criteria and "cocktail" mix. Adaptive trials often employ a Bayesian experimental design to assess the trial's progress. In some cases, trials have become an ongoing process that regularly adds and drops therapies and patient groups as more information is gained. The aim is to more quickly identify drugs that have a therapeutic effect and to zero in on patient populations for whom the drug is appropriate.

Clinical trials are conducted typically in four phases, with each phase using different numbers of subjects and having a different purpose to construct focus on identifying a specific effect.

=== Phases ===
National Cancer Institute video on the phases of clinical trials

Clinical trials involving new drugs are commonly classified into five phases. Each phase of the drug approval process is treated as a separate clinical trial. The drug development process will normally proceed through phases I–IV over many years, frequently involving a decade or longer. If the drug successfully passes through phases I, II, and III, it will usually be approved by the national regulatory authority for use in the general population. Phase IV trials are performed after the newly approved drug, diagnostic or device is marketed, providing assessment about risks, benefits, or best uses.

Phase	Aim	Notes
Phase 0	Pharmacodynamics and pharmacokinetics in humans	Phase 0 trials are optional first-in-human trials. Single subtherapeutic doses of the study drug or treatment are given to a small number of subjects (typically 10 to 15) to gather preliminary data on the agent's pharmacodynamics (what the drug does to the body) and pharmacokinetics (what the body does to the drugs). For a test drug, the trial documents the absorption, distribution, metabolization, and clearance (excretion) of the drug, and the drug's interactions within the body, to confirm that these appear to be as expected.
Phase I	Screening for safety	These are often the first-in-person trials. Testing within a small group of people (typically 20–80) to evaluate safety, determine safe dosage ranges, and identify side effects.
Phase II	Establishing the preliminary efficacy of the drug in a "treatment group", usually against a placebo control group	Phase II-a is specifically designed to assess dosing requirements (how much drug should be given), while a phase II-b trial is designed to determine efficacy (100–300 people), assessing how well the drug works at the prescribed dose(s) to establish a therapeutic dose range and monitor for possible side effects.
Phase III	Final confirmation of safety and efficacy	Testing with large groups of people (typically 1,000–3,000) to confirm drug efficacy, evaluate its effectiveness, monitor side effects, compare it to commonly used treatments, and collect information that will allow it to be used safely.
Phase IV	Safety studies during sales	Postmarketing studies delineate risks, benefits, and optimal use. As such, they are ongoing during the drug's lifetime of active medical use.

== Trial design ==
National Cancer Institute video on clinical trial randomization

A fundamental distinction in evidence-based practice is between observational studies and randomized controlled trials. Types of observational studies in epidemiology, such as the cohort study and the case-control study, provide less compelling evidence than the randomized controlled trial. In observational studies, the investigators retrospectively assess associations between the treatments given to participants and their health status, with potential for considerable errors in design and interpretation.

A randomized controlled trial can provide compelling evidence that the study treatment causes an effect on human health.

Some phase II and most phase III drug trials are designed as randomized, double-blind, and placebo-controlled.

- Randomized: Each study subject is randomly assigned to receive either the study treatment or a placebo.
- Blind: The subjects involved in the study do not know which study treatment they receive. If the study is double-blind, the researchers also do not know which treatment a subject receives. This intent is to prevent researchers from treating the two groups differently. A form of double-blind study called a "double-dummy" design allows additional insurance against bias. In this kind of study, all patients are given both placebo and active doses in alternating periods.
- Placebo-controlled: The use of a placebo (fake treatment) allows the researchers to isolate the effect of the study treatment from the placebo effect.

Clinical studies having small numbers of subjects may be "sponsored" by single researchers or a small group of researchers, and are designed to test simple questions or feasibility to expand the research for a more comprehensive randomized controlled trial.

Clinical studies can be "sponsored" (financed and organized) by academic institutions, pharmaceutical companies, government entities and even private groups. Trials are conducted for new drugs, biotechnology, diagnostic assays or medical devices to determine their safety and efficacy prior to being submitted for regulatory review that would determine market approval.

=== Active control studies ===
In cases where giving a placebo to a person suffering from a disease may be unethical, "active comparator" (also known as "active control") trials may be conducted instead. In trials with an active control group, subjects are given either the experimental treatment or a previously approved treatment with known effectiveness. In other cases, sponsors may conduct an active comparator trial to establish an efficacy claim relative to the active comparator instead of the placebo in labeling.

=== Master protocol ===
A master protocol includes multiple substudies, which may have different objectives and involve coordinated efforts to evaluate one or more medical products in one or more diseases or conditions within the overall study structure. Trials that could develop a master protocol include the umbrella trial (multiple medical products for a single disease), platform trial (multiple products for a single disease entering and leaving the platform), and basket trial (one medical product for multiple diseases or disease subtypes).

Genetic testing enables researchers to group patients according to their genetic profile, deliver drugs based on that profile to that group and compare the results. Multiple companies can participate, each bringing a different drug. The first such approach targets squamous cell cancer, which includes varying genetic disruptions from patient to patient. Amgen, AstraZeneca and Pfizer are involved, the first time they have worked together in a late-stage trial. Patients whose genomic profiles do not match any of the trial drugs receive a drug designed to stimulate the immune system to attack cancer.

=== Clinical trial protocol ===
A clinical trial protocol is a document used to define and manage the trial. It is prepared by a panel of experts. All study investigators are expected to strictly observe the protocol.

The protocol describes the scientific rationale, objective(s), design, methodology, statistical considerations and organization of the planned trial. Details of the trial are provided in documents referenced in the protocol, such as an investigator's brochure.

The protocol contains a precise study plan to assure safety and health of the trial subjects and to provide an exact template for trial conduct by investigators. This allows data to be combined across all investigators/sites. The protocol also informs the study administrators (often a contract research organization).

The format and content of clinical trial protocols sponsored by pharmaceutical, biotechnology or medical device companies in the United States, European Union, or Japan have been standardized to follow Good Clinical Practice guidance issued by the International Conference on Harmonisation (ICH). Regulatory authorities in Canada, China, South Korea, and the UK also follow ICH guidelines. Journals such as Trials, encourage investigators to publish their protocols.

=== Design features ===
==== Informed consent ====
Example of informed consent document from the PARAMOUNT trial

Clinical trials recruit study subjects to sign a document representing their "informed consent". The document includes details such as its purpose, duration, required procedures, risks, potential benefits, key contacts and institutional requirements. The participant then decides whether to sign the document. The document is not a contract, as the participant can withdraw at any time without penalty.

Informed consent is a legal process in which a recruit is instructed about key facts before deciding whether to participate. Researchers explain the details of the study in terms the subject can understand. The information is presented in the subject's native language. Generally, children cannot autonomously provide informed consent, but depending on their age and other factors, may be required to provide informed assent.

==== Statistical power ====
In any clinical trial, the number of subjects, also called the sample size, has a large impact on the ability to reliably detect and measure the effects of the intervention. This ability is described as its "power", which must be calculated before initiating a study to figure out if the study is worth its costs. In general, a larger sample size increases the statistical power, also the cost.

The statistical power estimates the ability of a trial to detect a difference of a particular size (or larger) between the treatment and control groups. For example, a trial of a lipid-lowering drug versus placebo with 100 patients in each group might have a power of 0.90 to detect a difference between placebo and trial groups receiving dosage of 10 mg/dL or more, but only 0.70 to detect a difference of 6 mg/dL.

=== Placebo groups ===
Merely giving a treatment can have nonspecific effects. These are controlled for by the inclusion of patients who receive only a placebo. Subjects are assigned randomly without informing them to which group they belonged. Many trials are doubled-blinded so that researchers do not know to which group a subject is assigned.

Assigning a subject to a placebo group can pose an ethical problem if it violates his or her right to receive the best available treatment. The Declaration of Helsinki provides guidelines on this issue.

=== Duration ===
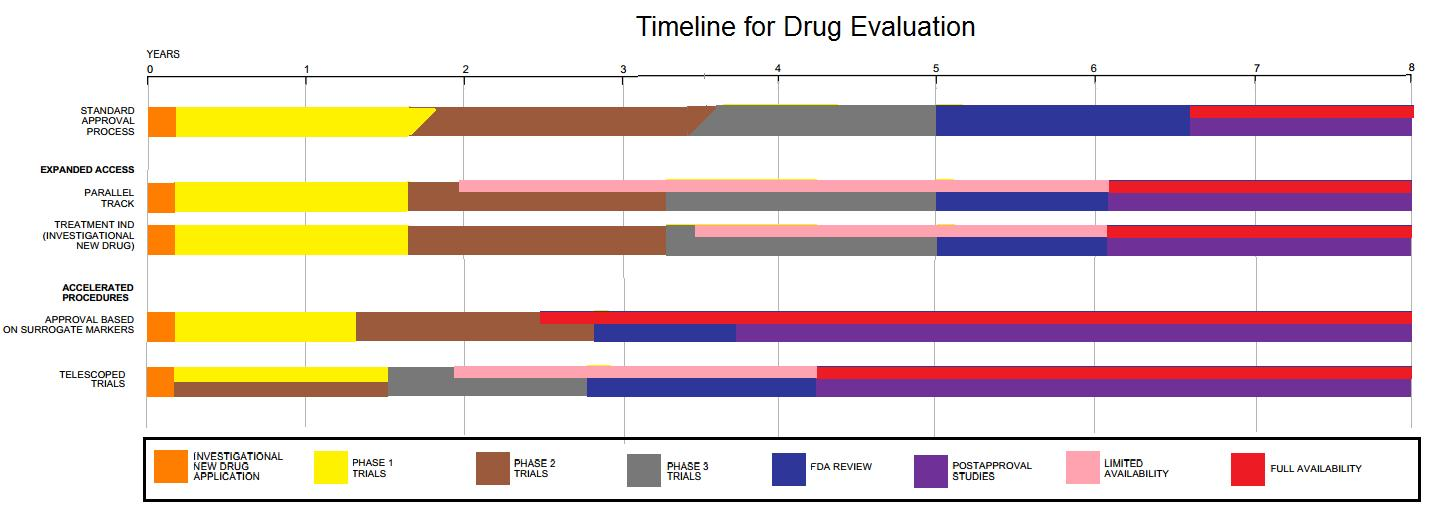
Timeline of various approval tracks and research phases in the US

Clinical trials are only a small part of the research that goes into developing a new treatment. Potential drugs, for example, first have to be discovered, purified, characterized, and tested in labs (in cell and animal studies) before ever undergoing clinical trials. In all, about 1,000 potential drugs are tested before just one reaches the point of being tested in a clinical trial. For example, a new cancer drug has, on average, six years of research behind it before it even makes it to clinical trials. But the major holdup in making new cancer drugs available is the time it takes to complete clinical trials themselves. On average, about eight years pass from the time a cancer drug enters clinical trials until it receives approval from regulatory agencies for sale to the public. Drugs for other diseases have similar timelines.

Some reasons a clinical trial might last several years:

- For chronic conditions such as cancer, it takes months, if not years, to see if a cancer treatment has an effect on a patient.
- For drugs that are not expected to have a strong effect (meaning a large number of patients must be recruited to observe 'any' effect), recruiting enough patients to test the drug's effectiveness (i.e., getting statistical power) can take several years.
- Only certain people who have the target disease condition are eligible to take part in each clinical trial. Researchers who treat these particular patients must participate in the trial. Then they must identify the desirable patients and obtain consent from them or their families to take part in the trial.

A clinical trial might also include an extended post-study follow-up period from months to years for people who have participated in the trial, a so-called "extension phase", which aims to identify long-term impact of the treatment.

The biggest barrier to completing studies is the shortage of people who take part. All drug and many device trials target a subset of the population, meaning not everyone can participate. Some drug trials require patients to have unusual combinations of disease characteristics. It is a challenge to find the appropriate patients and obtain their consent, especially when they may receive no direct benefit (because they are not paid, the study drug is not yet proven to work, or the patient may receive a placebo). In the case of cancer patients, fewer than 5% of adults with cancer will participate in drug trials. According to the Pharmaceutical Research and Manufacturers of America (PhRMA), about 400 cancer medicines were being tested in clinical trials in 2005. Not all of these will prove to be useful, but those that are may be delayed in getting approved because the number of participants is so low.

For clinical trials involving potential for seasonal influences (such as airborne allergies, seasonal affective disorder, influenza, and skin diseases), the study may be done during a limited part of the year (such as spring for pollen allergies), when the drug can be tested.

Clinical trials that do not involve a new drug usually have a much shorter duration. (Exceptions are epidemiological studies, such as the Nurses' Health Study).

== Administration ==
Clinical trials designed by a local investigator, and (in the US) federally funded clinical trials, are almost always administered by the researcher who designed the study and applied for the grant. Small-scale device studies may be administered by the sponsoring company. Clinical trials of new drugs are usually administered by a contract research organization (CRO) hired by the sponsoring company. The sponsor provides the drug and medical oversight. A CRO is contracted to perform all the administrative work on a clinical trial. For phases II–IV the CRO recruits participating researchers, trains them, provides them with supplies, coordinates study administration and data collection, sets up meetings, monitors the sites for compliance with the clinical protocol, and ensures the sponsor receives data from every site. Specialist site management organizations can also be hired to coordinate with the CRO to ensure rapid IRB/IEC approval and faster site initiation and patient recruitment. Phase I clinical trials of new medicines are often conducted in a specialist clinical trial clinic, with dedicated pharmacologists, where the subjects can be observed by full-time staff. These clinics are often run by a CRO which specialises in these studies.

At a participating site, one or more research assistants (often nurses) do most of the work in conducting the clinical trial. The research assistant's job can include some or all of the following: providing the local institutional review board (IRB) with the documentation necessary to obtain its permission to conduct the study, assisting with study start-up, identifying eligible patients, obtaining consent from them or their families, administering study treatment(s), collecting and statistically analyzing data, maintaining and updating data files during followup, and communicating with the IRB, as well as the sponsor and CRO.

=== Quality ===
In the context of a clinical trial, quality typically refers to the absence of errors which can impact decision making, both during the conduct of the trial and in use of the trial results.

=== Marketing ===
An Interactional Justice Model may be used to test the effects of willingness to talk with a doctor about clinical trial enrollment. Results found that potential clinical trial candidates were less likely to enroll in clinical trials if the patient is more willing to talk with their doctor. The reasoning behind this discovery may be patients are happy with their current care. Another reason for the negative relationship between perceived fairness and clinical trial enrollment is the lack of independence from the care provider. Results found that there is a positive relationship between a lack of willingness to talk with their doctor and clinical trial enrollment. Lack of willingness to talk about clinical trials with current care providers may be due to patients' independence from the doctor. Patients who are less likely to talk about clinical trials are more willing to use other sources of information to gain a better insight of alternative treatments. Clinical trial enrollment should be motivated to utilize websites and television advertising to inform the public about clinical trial enrollment.

=== Information technology ===
The last decade has seen a proliferation of information technology use in the planning and conduct of clinical trials. Clinical trial management systems are often used by research sponsors or CROs to help plan and manage the operational aspects of a clinical trial, particularly with respect to investigational sites. Advanced analytics for identifying researchers and research sites with expertise in a given area utilize public and private information about ongoing research. Web-based electronic data capture (EDC) and clinical data management systems are used in a majority of clinical trials to collect case report data from sites, manage its quality and prepare it for analysis. Interactive voice response systems are used by sites to register the enrollment of patients using a phone and to allocate patients to a particular treatment arm (although phones are being increasingly replaced with web-based (IWRS) tools which are sometimes part of the EDC system). While patient-reported outcome were often paper based in the past, measurements are increasingly being collected using web portals or hand-held ePRO (or eDiary) devices, sometimes wireless. Statistical software is used to analyze the collected data and prepare them for regulatory submission. Access to many of these applications are increasingly aggregated in web-based clinical trial portals. In 2011, the FDA approved a phase I trial that used telemonitoring, also known as remote patient monitoring, to collect biometric data in patients' homes and transmit it electronically to the trial database. This technology provides many more data points and is far more convenient for patients, because they have fewer visits to trial sites. As noted below, decentralized clinical trials are those that do not require patients' physical presence at a site, and instead rely largely on digital health data collection, digital informed consent processes, and so on.

== Estimands ==
To promote better consistency between a trial's objective and analysis methods, the International Committee for Harmonization of Technical Requirements for Pharmaceuticals for Human Use (ICH) has published a new international trial regulatory guidance in Nov 2019, the ICH E9(R1) Addendum on Estimands and Sensitivity Analysis in Clinical Trials. The guidance calls for clearly defining the research question of a trial by specifying its estimand.

An estimand is a clear description of the treatment effect a trial aims to quantify. The guidance provides a structured framework for defining estimands, which consists of five attributes: (i) population of patients; (ii) treatment conditions being compared; (iii) the endpoint; (iv) the summary measure; and (v) how intercurrent events are handled. Tutorials on how to implement the estimand framework is available.

== Analysis ==
A clinical trial produces data that could reveal quantitative differences between two or more interventions; statistical analyses are used to determine whether such differences are true, result from chance, or are the same as no treatment (placebo). Data from a clinical trial accumulate gradually over the trial duration, extending from months to years. Accordingly, results for participants recruited early in the study become available for analysis while subjects are still being assigned to treatment groups in the trial. Early analysis may allow the emerging evidence to assist decisions about whether to stop the study, or to reassign participants to the more successful segment of the trial. Investigators may also want to stop a trial when data analysis shows no treatment effect.

== Ethical aspects ==
Clinical trials are closely supervised by appropriate regulatory authorities. All studies involving a medical or therapeutic intervention on patients must be approved by a supervising ethics committee before permission is granted to run the trial. The local ethics committee has discretion on how it will supervise noninterventional studies (observational studies or those using already collected data). In the US, this body is called the Institutional Review Board (IRB); in the EU, they are called Ethics committees. Most IRBs are located at the local investigator's hospital or institution, but some sponsors allow the use of a central (independent/for profit) IRB for investigators who work at smaller institutions.

To be ethical, researchers must obtain the full and informed consent of participating human subjects. (One of the IRB's main functions is to ensure potential patients are adequately informed about the clinical trial.) If the patient is unable to consent for him/herself, researchers can seek consent from the patient's legally authorized representative. In addition, the clinical trial participants must be made aware that they can withdraw from the clinical trial at any time without any adverse action taken against them. In California, the state has prioritized the individuals who can serve as the legally authorized representative.

In some US locations, the local IRB must certify researchers and their staff before they can conduct clinical trials. They must understand the federal patient privacy (HIPAA) law and good clinical practice. The International Conference of Harmonisation Guidelines for Good Clinical Practice is a set of standards used internationally for the conduct of clinical trials. The guidelines aim to ensure the "rights, safety and well being of trial subjects are protected".

The notion of informed consent of participating human subjects exists in many countries but its precise definition may still vary.

Informed consent is clearly a 'necessary' condition for ethical conduct but does not 'ensure' ethical conduct. In compassionate use trials the latter becomes a particularly difficult problem. The final objective is to serve the community of patients or future patients in a best-possible and most responsible way. See also Expanded access. However, it may be hard to turn this objective into a well-defined, quantified, objective function. In some cases this can be done, however, for instance, for questions of when to stop sequential treatments (see Odds algorithm), and then quantified methods may play an important role.

Additional ethical concerns are present when conducting clinical trials on children (pediatrics), and in emergency or epidemic situations.

Ethically balancing the rights of multiple stakeholders may be difficult. For example, when drug trials fail, the sponsors may have a duty to tell current and potential investors immediately, which means both the research staff and the enrolled participants may first hear about the end of a trial through public business news.

=== Conflicts of interest and unfavorable studies ===
In response to specific cases in which unfavorable data from pharmaceutical company-sponsored research were not published, the Pharmaceutical Research and Manufacturers of America published new guidelines urging companies to report all findings and limit the financial involvement in drug companies by researchers. The US Congress signed into law a bill which requires phase II and phase III clinical trials to be registered by the sponsor on the clinicaltrials.gov website compiled by the National Institutes of Health.

Drug researchers not directly employed by pharmaceutical companies often seek grants from manufacturers, and manufacturers often look to academic researchers to conduct studies within networks of universities and their hospitals, e.g., for translational cancer research. Independent clinical trials funded by public or charitable money, research centres or voluntary groups might help. However, competition for tenured academic positions, government grants and prestige create conflicts of interest among academic scientists. According to one study, approximately 75% of articles retracted for misconduct-related reasons have no declared industry financial support. Seeding trials are particularly controversial.

In the United States, all clinical trials submitted to the Food and Drug Administration (FDA) as part of a drug approval process are independently assessed by clinical experts within the FDA, including inspections of primary data collection at selected clinical trial sites.

In 2001, the editors of 12 major journals issued a joint editorial, published in each journal, on the control over clinical trials exerted by sponsors, particularly targeting the use of contracts which allow sponsors to review the studies prior to publication and withhold publication. They strengthened editorial restrictions to counter the effect. The editorial noted that contract research organizations had, by 2000, received 60% of the grants from pharmaceutical companies in the US. Researchers may be restricted from contributing to the trial design, accessing the raw data, and interpreting the results.

Despite explicit recommendations by stakeholders of measures to improve the standards of industry-sponsored medical research, in 2013, Tohen warned of the persistence of a gap in the credibility of conclusions arising from industry-funded clinical trials, and called for ensuring strict adherence to ethical standards in industrial collaborations with academia, in order to avoid further erosion of the public's trust. Issues referred for attention in this respect include potential observation bias, duration of the observation time for maintenance studies, the selection of the patient populations, factors that affect placebo response, and funding sources.

=== During public health crisis ===
Conducting clinical trials of vaccines during epidemics and pandemics is subject to ethical concerns. For diseases with high mortality rates like Ebola, assigning individuals to a placebo or control group can be viewed as a death sentence. In response to ethical concerns regarding clinical research during epidemics, the National Academy of Medicine authored a report identifying seven ethical and scientific considerations. These considerations are:

- Scientific value
- Social value
- Respect for persons
- Community engagement
- Concern for participant welfare and interests
- A balance towards benefit over risks
- Post-trial access to tested therapies that had been withheld during the trial

=== Pregnant women and children ===
Pregnant women and children are typically excluded from clinical trials as vulnerable populations, though the data to support excluding them is not robust. By excluding them from clinical trials, information about the safety and effectiveness of therapies for these populations is often lacking. During the early history of the HIV/AIDS epidemic, a scientist noted that by excluding these groups from potentially life-saving treatment, they were being "protected to death". Projects such as Research Ethics for Vaccines, Epidemics, and New Technologies (PREVENT) have advocated for the ethical inclusion of pregnant women in vaccine trials. Inclusion of children in clinical trials has additional moral considerations, as children lack decision-making autonomy. Trials in the past had been criticized for using hospitalized children or orphans; these ethical concerns effectively stopped future research. In efforts to maintain effective pediatric care, several European countries and the US have policies to entice or compel pharmaceutical companies to conduct pediatric trials. International guidance recommends ethical pediatric trials by limiting harm, considering varied risks, and taking into account the complexities of pediatric care.

== Safety ==
Responsibility for the safety of the subjects in a clinical trial is shared between the sponsor, the local site investigators (if different from the sponsor), the various IRBs that supervise the study, and (in some cases, if the study involves a marketable drug or device), the regulatory agency for the country where the drug or device will be sold.

A systematic concurrent safety review is frequently employed to assure research participant safety. The conduct and on-going review is designed to be proportional to the risk of the trial. Typically this role is filled by a Data and Safety Committee, an externally appointed Medical Safety Monitor, an Independent Safety Officer, or for small or low-risk studies the principal investigator.

For safety reasons, many clinical trials of drugs are designed to exclude women of childbearing age, pregnant women, or women who become pregnant during the study. In some cases, the male partners of these women are also excluded or required to take birth control measures.

=== Efficacy ===
Efficacy is the ability of a treatment or intervention to produce its intended effect under controlled conditions. It can be influenced by factors such as dosage, patient characteristics, disease severity, and treatment adherence.

=== Sponsor ===
Throughout the clinical trial, the sponsor is responsible for accurately informing the local site investigators of the true historical safety record of the drug, device or other medical treatments to be tested, and of any potential interactions of the study treatment(s) with already approved treatments. This allows the local investigators to make an informed judgment on whether to participate in the study or not. The sponsor is also responsible for monitoring the results of the study as they come in from the various sites as the trial proceeds. In larger clinical trials, a sponsor will use the services of a data monitoring committee (DMC, known in the US as a data safety monitoring board). This independent group of clinicians and statisticians meets periodically to review the unblinded data the sponsor has received so far. The DMC has the power to recommend termination of the study based on their review, for example if the study treatment is causing more deaths than the standard treatment, or seems to be causing unexpected and study-related serious adverse events. The sponsor is responsible for collecting adverse event reports from all site investigators in the study, and for informing all the investigators of the sponsor's judgment as to whether these adverse events were related or not related to the study treatment.

The sponsor and the local site investigators are jointly responsible for writing a site-specific informed consent that accurately informs the potential subjects of the true risks and potential benefits of participating in the study, while at the same time presenting the material as briefly as possible and in ordinary language. FDA regulations state that participating in clinical trials is voluntary, with the subject having the right not to participate or to end participation at any time.

=== Local site investigators ===
The ethical principle of primum non-nocere ("first, do no harm") guides the trial, and if an investigator believes the study treatment may be harming subjects in the study, the investigator can stop participating at any time. On the other hand, investigators often have a financial interest in recruiting subjects, and could act unethically to obtain and maintain their participation.

The local investigators are responsible for conducting the study according to the study protocol, and supervising the study staff throughout the duration of the study. The local investigator or his/her study staff are also responsible for ensuring the potential subjects in the study understand the risks and potential benefits of participating in the study. In other words, they (or their legally authorized representatives) must give truly informed consent.

Local investigators are responsible for reviewing all adverse event reports sent by the sponsor. These adverse event reports contain the opinions of both the investigator (at the site where the adverse event occurred) and the sponsor, regarding the relationship of the adverse event to the study treatments. Local investigators also are responsible for making an independent judgment of these reports, and promptly informing the local IRB of all serious and study treatment-related adverse events.

When a local investigator is the sponsor, there may not be formal adverse event reports, but study staff at all locations are responsible for informing the coordinating investigator of anything unexpected. The local investigator is responsible for being truthful to the local IRB in all communications relating to the study.

=== Institutional review boards (IRBs) ===
Approval by an Institutional Review Board (IRB), or Independent Ethics Committee (IEC), is necessary before all but the most informal research can begin. In commercial clinical trials, the study protocol is not approved by an IRB before the sponsor recruits sites to conduct the trial. However, the study protocol and procedures have been tailored to fit generic IRB submission requirements. In this case, and where there is no independent sponsor, each local site investigator submits the study protocol, the consent(s), the data collection forms, and supporting documentation to the local IRB. Universities and most hospitals have in-house IRBs. Other researchers (such as in walk-in clinics) use independent IRBs.

The IRB scrutinizes the study both for medical safety and for protection of the patients involved in the study, before it allows the researcher to begin the study. It may require changes in study procedures or in the explanations given to the patient. A required yearly "continuing review" report from the investigator updates the IRB on the progress of the study and any new safety information related to the study.

=== Regulatory agencies ===
In the US, the Food and Drug Administration (FDA) can audit the files of local site investigators after they have finished participating in a study, to see if they were correctly following study procedures. This audit may be random, or for cause (because the investigator is suspected of fraudulent data). Avoiding an audit is an incentive for investigators to follow study procedures. A 'covered clinical study' refers to a trial submitted to the FDA as part of a marketing application (for example, as part of an NDA or 510(k)), about which the FDA may require disclosure of financial interest of the clinical investigator in the outcome of the study. For example, the applicant must disclose whether an investigator owns equity in the sponsor, or owns proprietary interest in the product under investigation. The FDA defines a covered study as "any study of a drug, biological product or device in humans submitted in a marketing application or reclassification petition that the applicant or FDA relies on to establish that the product is effective (including studies that show equivalence to an effective product) or any study in which a single investigator makes a significant contribution to the demonstration of safety".

Alternatively, many American pharmaceutical companies have moved some clinical trials overseas. Benefits of conducting trials abroad include lower costs (in some countries) and the ability to run larger trials in shorter timeframes, whereas a potential disadvantage exists in lower-quality trial management. Different countries have different regulatory requirements and enforcement abilities. An estimated 40% of all clinical trials now take place in Asia, Eastern Europe, and Central and South America. "There is no compulsory registration system for clinical trials in these countries and many do not follow European directives in their operations", says Jacob Sijtsma of the Netherlands-based WEMOS, an advocacy health organisation tracking clinical trials in developing countries.

Beginning in the 1980s, harmonization of clinical trial protocols was shown as feasible across countries of the European Union. At the same time, coordination between Europe, Japan and the United States led to a joint regulatory-industry initiative on international harmonization named after 1990 as the International Conference on Harmonisation of Technical Requirements for Registration of Pharmaceuticals for Human Use (ICH) Currently, most clinical trial programs follow ICH guidelines, aimed at "ensuring that good quality, safe and effective medicines are developed and registered in the most efficient and cost-effective manner. These activities are pursued in the interest of the consumer and public health, to prevent unnecessary duplication of clinical trials in humans and to minimize the use of animal testing without compromising the regulatory obligations of safety and effectiveness."

=== Aggregation of safety data during clinical development ===
Aggregating safety data across clinical trials during drug development is important because trials are generally designed to focus on determining how well the drug works. The safety data collected and aggregated across multiple trials as the drug is developed allows the sponsor, investigators and regulatory agencies to monitor the aggregate safety profile of experimental medicines as they are developed. The value of assessing aggregate safety data is: a) decisions based on aggregate safety assessment during development of the medicine can be made throughout the medicine's development and b) it sets up the sponsor and regulators well for assessing the medicine's safety after the drug is approved.

== Economics ==
Clinical trial costs vary depending on trial phase, type of trial, and disease studied. A study of clinical trials conducted in the United States from 2004 to 2012 found the average cost of phase I trials to be between $1.4 million and $6.6 million, depending on the type of disease. Phase II trials ranged from $7 million to $20 million, and phase III trials from $11 million to $53 million.

=== Sponsor ===
The cost of a study depends on many factors, especially the number of sites conducting the study, the number of patients involved, and whether the study treatment is already approved for medical use.

The expenses incurred by a pharmaceutical company in administering a phase III or IV clinical trial may include, among others:

- production of the drug(s) or device(s) being evaluated
- staff salaries for the designers and administrators of the trial
- payments to the contract research organization, the site management organization (if used) and any outside consultants
- payments to local researchers and their staff for their time and effort in recruiting test subjects and collecting data for the sponsor
- the cost of study materials and the charges incurred to ship them
- communication with the local researchers, including on-site monitoring by the CRO before and (in some cases) multiple times during the study
- one or more investigator training meetings
- expense incurred by the local researchers, such as pharmacy fees, IRB fees and postage
- any payments to subjects enrolled in the trial
- the expense of treating a test subject who develops a medical condition caused by the study drug

These expenses are incurred over several years.

In the US, sponsors may receive a 50 percent tax credit for clinical trials conducted on drugs being developed for the treatment of orphan diseases. National health agencies, such as the US National Institutes of Health, offer grants to investigators who design clinical trials that attempt to answer research questions of interest to the agency. In these cases, the investigator who writes the grant and administers the study acts as the sponsor, and coordinates data collection from any other sites. These other sites may or may not be paid for participating in the study, depending on the amount of the grant and the amount of effort expected from them. Using internet resources can, in some cases, reduce the economic burden.

=== Investigators ===
Investigators are often compensated for their work in clinical trials. These amounts can be small, just covering a partial salary for research assistants and the cost of any supplies (usually the case with national health agency studies), or be substantial and include "overhead" that allows the investigator to pay the research staff during times between clinical trials.

=== Subjects ===
Participants in phase I drug trials do not gain any direct health benefit from taking part. They are generally paid a fee for their time, with payments regulated and not related to any risk involved. Motivations of healthy volunteers is not limited to financial reward and may include other motivations such as contributing to science and others. In later phase trials, subjects may not be paid to ensure their motivation for participating with potential for a health benefit or contributing to medical knowledge. Small payments may be made for study-related expenses such as travel or as compensation for their time in providing follow-up information about their health after the trial treatment ends.

== Participant recruitment and participation ==
Newspaper advertisements seeking patients and healthy volunteers to participate in clinical trials

Phase 0 and phase I drug trials seek healthy volunteers. Most other clinical trials seek patients who have a specific disease or medical condition. The diversity observed in society should be reflected in clinical trials through the appropriate inclusion of ethnic minority populations. Patient recruitment or participant recruitment plays a significant role in the activities and responsibilities of sites conducting clinical trials.

All volunteers being considered for a trial are required to undertake a medical screening. Requirements differ according to the trial needs, but typically volunteers would be screened in a medical laboratory for:

- Measurement of the electrical activity of the heart (ECG)
- Measurement of blood pressure, heart rate, and body temperature
- Blood sampling
- Urine sampling
- Weight and height measurement
- Drug abuse testing
- Pregnancy testing

It has been observed that participants in clinical trials are disproportionately white. Often, minorities are not informed about clinical trials. One recent systematic review of the literature found that race/ethnicity as well as sex were not well-represented nor at times even tracked as participants in a large number of clinical trials of hearing loss management in adults. This may reduce the validity of findings in respect of non-white patients by not adequately representing the larger populations.

=== Locating trials ===
Depending on the kind of participants required, sponsors of clinical trials, or contract research organizations working on their behalf, try to find sites with qualified personnel as well as access to people who could participate in the trial. Working with those sites, they may use various recruitment strategies, including patient databases, newspaper and radio advertisements, flyers, posters in places the patients might go (such as doctor's offices), and personal recruitment of trial participants by investigators.

Volunteers may search directly to locate trials using a registry run by the U.S. National Institutes of Health and National Library of Medicine to identify studies that are currently recruiting participants, offering simplified navigation and real-time enrollment trial information. Software exists to enable clinicians to find trial options for a possible participant based on genomic data for people with cancer.

=== Research ===
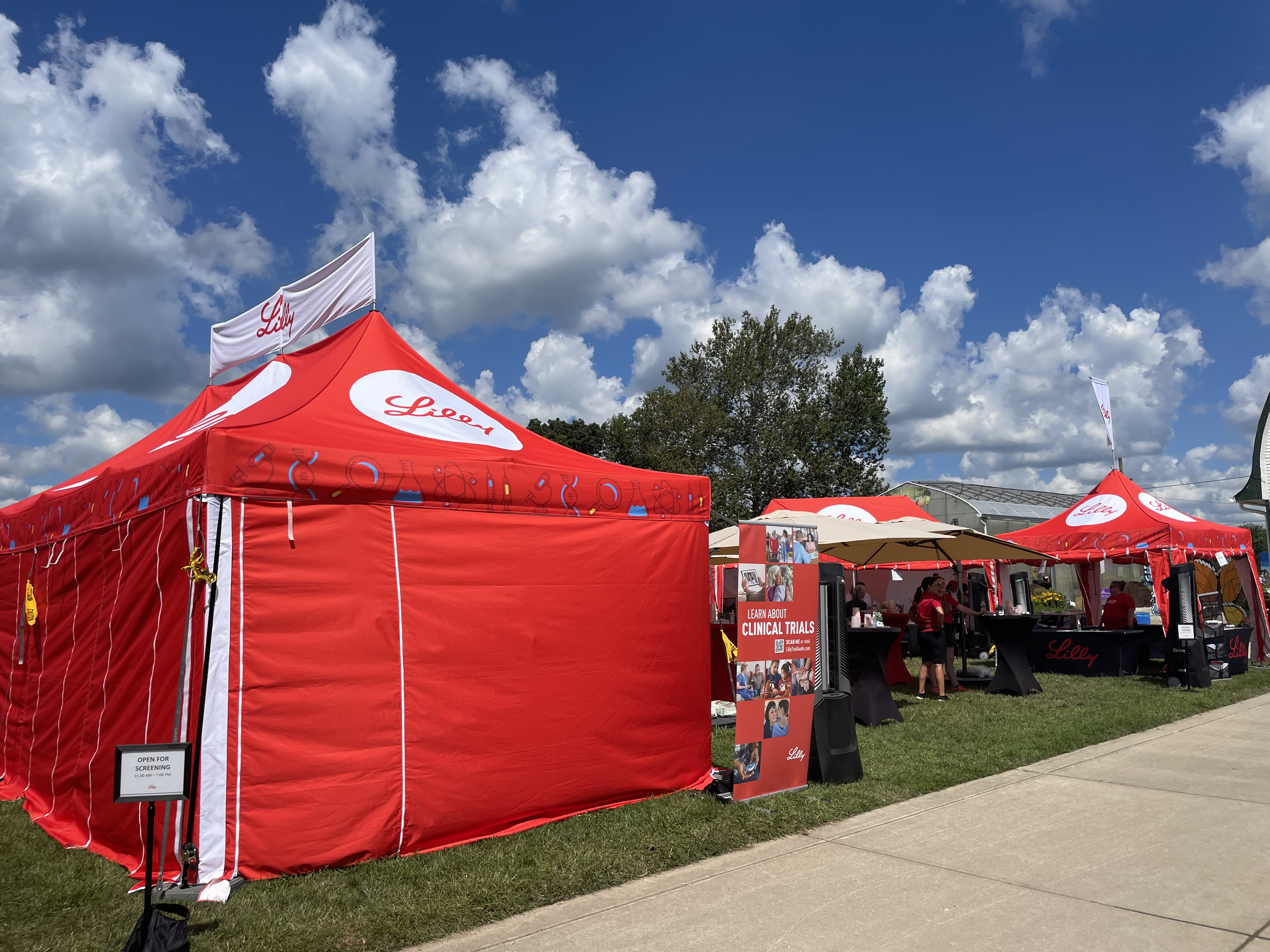
Eli Lilly pharmaceutical company recruiting participants at the Indiana State Fair

The risk information seeking and processing (RISP) model analyzes social implications that affect attitudes and decision making pertaining to clinical trials. People who hold a higher stake or interest in the treatment provided in a clinical trial showed a greater likelihood of seeking information about clinical trials. Cancer patients reported more optimistic attitudes towards clinical trials than the general population. Having a more optimistic outlook on clinical trials also leads to greater likelihood of enrolling.

=== Matching ===
Matching involves a systematic comparison of a patient's clinical and demographic information against the eligibility criteria of various trials. Methods include:

- Manual: Healthcare providers or clinical trial coordinators manually review patient records and available trial criteria to identify potential matches. This might also include manually searching in clinical trial databases.
- Electronic health records (EHR). Some systems integrate with EHRs to automatically flag patients that may be eligible for trials based on their medical data. These systems may leverage machine learning, artificial intelligence or precision medicine methods to more effectively match patients to trials. These methods are faced with the challenge of overcoming the limitations of EHR records such as omissions and logging errors.
- Direct-to-patient services: Resources are specialized to support patients in finding clinical trials through online platforms, hotlines, and personalized support.

== Decentralized trials ==
Although trials are commonly conducted at major medical centers, some participants are excluded due to the distance and expenses required for travel, leading to hardship, disadvantage, and inequity for participants, especially those in rural and underserved communities. "Decentralized clinical trials" minimize or eliminates the need for patients to travel to sites, and are now more widespread; a capability improved by telehealth and wearable technologies.

== See also ==
- Outcome measure
- Preregistration (science)
- Marketing authorisation
- Independent clinical trials
- Decentralised clinical trial
