= Epidemiological method =

Scientific method in the specific field

The science of epidemiology has matured significantly from the times of Hippocrates, Semmelweis and John Snow. The techniques for gathering and analyzing epidemiological data vary depending on the type of disease being monitored but each study will have overarching similarities.

== Outline of the process of an epidemiological study ==
1. Establish that a problem exists
  - Full epidemiological studies are expensive and laborious undertakings. Before any study is started, a case must be made for the importance of the research.
2. Confirm the homogeneity of the events
  - Any conclusions drawn from inhomogeneous cases will be suspicious. All events or occurrences of the disease must be true cases of the disease.
3. Collect all the events
  - It is important to collect as much information as possible about each event in order to inspect a large number of possible risk factors. The events may be collected from varied methods of epidemiological study or from censuses or hospital records.
  - The events can be characterized by Incidence rates and prevalence rates.
  - Often, occurrence of a single disease entity is set as an event.
  - Given inherent heterogeneous nature of any given disease (i.e., the unique disease principle), a single disease entity may be treated as disease subtypes. This framework is well conceptualized in the interdisciplinary field of molecular pathological epidemiology (MPE).
4. Characterize the events as to epidemiological factors
  1. Predisposing factors
    - Non-environmental factors that increase the likelihood of getting a disease. Genetic history, age, and gender are examples.
  2. Enabling/disabling factors
    - Factors relating to the environment that either increase or decrease the likelihood of disease. Exercise and good diet are examples of disabling factors. A weakened immune system and poor nutrition are examples of enabling factors.
  3. Precipitation factors
    - This factor is the most important in that it identifies the source of exposure. It may be a germ, toxin or gene.
  4. Reinforcing factors
    - These are factors that compound the likelihood of getting a disease. They may include repeated exposure or excessive environmental stresses.
5. Look for patterns and trends
  - Here one looks for similarities in the cases which may identify major risk factors for contracting the disease. Epidemic curves may be used to identify such risk factors.
6. Formulate a hypothesis
  - If a trend has been observed in the cases, the researcher may postulate as to the nature of the relationship between the potential disease-causing agent and the disease.
7. Test the hypothesis
  - Because epidemiological studies can rarely be conducted in a laboratory the results are often polluted by uncontrollable variations in the cases. This often makes the results difficult to interpret. Two methods have evolved to assess the strength of the relationship between the disease causing agent and the disease.
  - Koch's postulates were the first criteria developed for epidemiological relationships. Because they only work well for highly contagious bacteria and toxins, this method is largely out of favor.
  - Bradford-Hill Criteria are the current standards for epidemiological relationships. A relationship may fill all, some, or none of the criteria and still be true.
8. Publish the results.

== Measures ==
Epidemiologists are famous for their use of rates. Each measure serves to characterize the disease giving valuable information about contagiousness, incubation period, duration, and mortality of the disease.

=== Measures of occurrence ===
1. Incidence measures
  1. Incidence rate, where cases included are defined using a case definition
  2. Hazard rate
  3. Cumulative incidence
2. Prevalence measures
  1. Point prevalence
  2. Period prevalence

=== Measures of association ===
1. Relative measures
  1. Risk ratio
  2. Rate ratio
  3. Odds ratio
  4. Hazard ratio
2. Absolute measures
  1. Absolute risk reduction
  2. Attributable risk
    1. Attributable risk in exposed
    2. Percent attributable risk
    3. Levin's attributable risk

=== Other measures ===
1. Virulence and Infectivity
2. Mortality rate and Morbidity rate
3. Case fatality
4. Sensitivity (tests) and Specificity (tests)

== Limitations ==
Epidemiological (and other observational) studies typically highlight associations between exposures and outcomes, rather than causation. While some consider this a limitation of observational research, epidemiological models of causation (e.g. Bradford Hill criteria) contend that an entire body of evidence is needed before determining if an association is truly causal. Moreover, many research questions are impossible to study in experimental settings, due to concerns around ethics and study validity. For example, the link between cigarette smoke and lung cancer was uncovered largely through observational research; however research ethics would certainly prohibit conducting a randomized trial of cigarette smoking once it had already been identified as a potential health threat.

== See also ==
- Clinical study design – Plan for research in clinical medicine
- Epi Info – Statistical software from the CDC
- Epidemiology – Study of health and disease within a population
- Molecular pathological epidemiology – Discipline combining epidemiology and pathology
- OpenEpi
- Sanitary epidemiological reconnaissance
