= Preventable fraction among the unexposed =

In epidemiology, preventable fraction among the unexposed (PFu) is the proportion of incidents in the unexposed group that could be prevented by exposure. It is calculated as $PF_u = (I_u - I_e)/I_u = 1 - RR$, where $I_e$ is the incidence in the exposed group, $I_u$ is the incidence in the unexposed group, and $RR$ is the relative risk. It is a synonym of the relative risk reduction.

It is used when an exposure reduces the risk, as opposed to increasing it, in which case its symmetrical notion is attributable fraction among the exposed.

== Numerical example ==
Example of risk reduction
Quantity	Experimental group (E)	Control group (C)	Total
Events (E)	EE = 15	CE = 100	115
Non-events (N)	EN = 135	CN = 150	285
Total subjects (S)	ES = EE + EN = 150	CS = CE + CN = 250	400
Event rate (ER)	EER = EE / ES = 0.1, or 10%	CER = CE / CS = 0.4, or 40%	—

Variable	Abbr.	Formula	Value
Absolute risk reduction	ARR	CER − EER	0.3, or 30%
Number needed to treat	NNT	1 / (CER − EER)	3.33
Relative risk (risk ratio)	RR	EER / CER	0.25
Relative risk reduction	RRR	(CER − EER) / CER, or 1 − RR	0.75, or 75%
Preventable fraction among the unexposed	PFu	(CER − EER) / CER	0.75
Odds ratio	OR	(EE / EN) / (CE / CN)	0.167

== See also ==
- Population Impact Measures
- Preventable fraction for the population
