= AirQ+ =

Software to assess the impact of air population on health

AirQ+ is a free software for Windows and Linux operating systems developed by the World Health Organization (WHO) Regional Office for Europe. The program calculates the magnitude of several health effects associated to exposure to the most relevant air pollutants in a given population. AirQ+ has been used in the BreatheLife campaign and in numerous studies aimed at measuring long-term exposure to ambient particulate matter PM_{2.5}. The first version of the program, AirQ, was distributed in a Microsoft Excel spreadsheet program in 1999, followed by another version of AirQ for Windows in 2000, 2004 and 2005. AirQ+ 1.0 was released in May 2016. A substantial difference between AirQ and AirQ+ is that AirQ+ contains a new graphical user interface with several help texts and various features to input and analyse data and illustrate results. AirQ+ version AirQ+ 1.2 was released in May 2017, followed by 1.3 in October 2018. Version 2.0 was released in November 2019, version 2.1 in May 2021 and version 2.2 in March 2023. It is available in the official languages of the WHO European Region: English, French, German and Russian. A Polish version of AirQ+ is also available since 2023 and Spanish, Arab and Farsi versions are planned for 2025.

== Purpose ==
AirQ+ is intended as a tool to ascertain the magnitude of the burden and impacts of air population on health in a given locality. It performs this function by featuring data analysis, graphing tools, tables and quantitative information for prominent pollutants such as particulate matter (PM), nitrogen dioxide (NO_{2}), and tropospheric ozone (O_{3}). AirQ+ also has the capacity to perform calculations for black carbon (BC) and provides rough estimates of impacts of household (indoor) air pollution on health. AirQ+ can be applied to long- and short-term exposure to ambient air pollution and to long-term household air pollution exposure caused by solid fuel use.

== Data input ==
For most prominent air pollutants, the user needs to input the following data:

- air quality data (concentration of air pollutants);
- relative risk (RR) values for the pollutant being assessed (source: epidemiological studies; default values are provided)
- data for population at risk (population distribution);
- health data (the health effect in question, like mortality);
- a concentration cut-off value for consideration.

For household (indoor air pollution), the user needs to provide the following input:

- relative risk (RR) values;
- data for population at risk;
- health data;
- percentage of solid fuels use.

A minimum working knowledge of epidemiological concepts, in particular exposure–response relationship, relative risk, attributable risk and life table calculations is required to run the software. AirQ+ includes default values users can use for running impact assessments.

== Users ==
Users include students, scientists, environmental experts, decision-makers, planners, and policy analysts. Advanced users can customize runtime parameters to meet their needs.

== Related software ==
Other online available software tools that calculate the impacts of air pollution have been developed by the United States Environmental Protection Agency with its BenMAP and by Health Canada with its AQBAT tool.
