= Number needed to harm =

Measure in epidemiology

Group exposed to a risk factor (left) has increased risk of an adverse outcome (dark) compared to the unexposed group (right). 4 individuals need to be exposed for 1 adverse outcome to occur (NNH = 4).

In medicine, the number needed to harm (NNH) is an epidemiological measure that indicates how many persons on average need to be exposed to a risk factor over a specific period to cause harm in an average of one person who would not otherwise have been harmed. It is defined as the inverse of the absolute risk increase, and computed as $1/(I_e - I_u)$, where $I_e$ is the incidence in the treated (exposed) group, and $I_u$ is the incidence in the control (unexposed) group. Intuitively, the lower the number needed to harm, the worse the risk factor, with 1 meaning that every exposed person is harmed.

NNH is similar to number needed to treat (NNT), where NNT usually refers to a positive therapeutic result and NNH to a detrimental effect or risk factor.

Marginal metrics:

- NNT for an additional beneficial outcome (NNTB)
- NNT for an additional harmful outcome (NNTH)

are also used.

== Relevance ==
The NNH is an important measure in evidence-based medicine and helps physicians decide whether it is prudent to proceed with a particular treatment which may expose the patient to harms while providing therapeutic benefits. If a clinical endpoint is devastating enough without the drug (e.g. death, heart attack), drugs with a low NNH may still be indicated in particular situations if the NNT is smaller than the NNH. However, there are several important problems with the NNH, involving bias and lack of reliable confidence intervals, as well as difficulties in excluding the possibility of no difference between two treatments or groups.

== Numerical example ==
Example of risk increase
Quantity	Experimental group (E)	Control group (C)	Total
Events (E)	EE = 75	CE = 100	175
Non-events (N)	EN = 75	CN = 150	225
Total subjects (S)	ES = EE + EN = 150	CS = CE + CN = 250	400
Event rate (ER)	EER = EE / ES = 0.5, or 50%	CER = CE / CS = 0.4, or 40%	—

Variable	Abbr.	Formula	Value
Absolute risk increase	ARI	EER − CER	0.1, or 10%
Number needed to harm	NNH	1 / (EER − CER)	10
Relative risk (risk ratio)	RR	EER / CER	1.25
Relative risk increase	RRI	(EER − CER) / CER, or RR − 1	0.25, or 25%
Attributable fraction among the exposed	AF_{e}	(EER − CER) / EER	0.2
Odds ratio	OR	(EE / EN) / (CE / CN)	1.5

== See also ==
- Pharmacoeconomics
