= Attributable fraction among the exposed =

Statistic in epidemiology

Group exposed to a risk factor (left) has increased risk of an adverse outcome (dark) compared to the unexposed group (right). In the exposed group, one third of the adverse outcomes can be attributed to the exposure (AFe = 1/3).

In epidemiology, attributable fraction among the exposed (AF_{e}) is the proportion of incidents in the exposed group that are attributable to the risk factor. The term attributable risk percent among the exposed is used if the fraction is expressed as a percentage. It is calculated as $AF_e = (I_e - I_u)/I_e = (RR - 1) / RR$, where $I_e$ is the incidence in the exposed group, $I_u$ is the incidence in the unexposed group, and $RR$ is the relative risk.

It is used when an exposure increases the risk, as opposed to reducing it, in which case its symmetrical notion is preventable fraction among the unexposed.

== Synonyms ==
Multiple synonyms of AF_{e} are in use: attributable fraction, relative attributable risk, attributable proportion among the exposed, and attributable risk among the exposed.

Similarly, attributable risk percent (ARP) is used as a synonym for the attributable risk percent among the exposed.

In climatology, fraction of attributable risk (FAR) is used to denote a proportion of adverse event risk attributable to the human influence on climate or other forcing factor.

== Numerical example ==
Example of risk increase
Quantity	Experimental group (E)	Control group (C)	Total
Events (E)	EE = 75	CE = 100	175
Non-events (N)	EN = 75	CN = 150	225
Total subjects (S)	ES = EE + EN = 150	CS = CE + CN = 250	400
Event rate (ER)	EER = EE / ES = 0.5, or 50%	CER = CE / CS = 0.4, or 40%	—

Variable	Abbr.	Formula	Value
Absolute risk increase	ARI	EER − CER	0.1, or 10%
Number needed to harm	NNH	1 / (EER − CER)	10
Relative risk (risk ratio)	RR	EER / CER	1.25
Relative risk increase	RRI	(EER − CER) / CER, or RR − 1	0.25, or 25%
Attributable fraction among the exposed	AF_{e}	(EER − CER) / EER	0.2
Odds ratio	OR	(EE / EN) / (CE / CN)	1.5

== See also ==
- Population Impact Measures
- Attributable fraction for the population
