= Annette Dobson =

Biostatistician researcher and professor

Annette Dobson AM
- Born: 4 September 1945 (age 81)
- Education: University of Adelaide; James Cook University
- Known for: introductory textbook to GLM
- Awards: 2015 FAHMS
- Scientific career
- Fields: Biostatistics
- Workplaces: University of Queensland

Annette Jane Dobson AM (born 4 September 1945) is an Australian statistician. She is a Professor of Biostatistics in the University of Queensland's Australian Women and Girl's Health Research (AWaGHR) Centre in the School of Public Health. Dobson was Director of the Australian Longitudinal Study on Women's Health from 1995 to 2013. She is a highly cited publication author, a book author, and has received an Australia Day award.

== Qualification ==
Dobson has a bachelor's degree from the University of Adelaide, and a master's degree and PhD from James Cook University. She has a postgraduate diploma in management from the University of New England (Australia).

== Research interests ==
Her research interests lie in the fields of biostatistics, epidemiology, longitudinal studies, and social determinants of health. In biostatistics, she is specifically interested in generalized linear modeling, clinical biostatistics, and statistical methods in longitudinal studies. Dobson's topics in epidemiology include tobacco control, diabetes, cardiovascular disease, obesity and health care service use.

== Positions ==
Dobson is the founding Director of the Australian Longitudinal Study on Women's Health (ALSWH) and was director of the Centre for Longitudinal and Life Course Research from 2012 - 2021.

She was the inaugural chair of the BCA Master of Biostatistics at its inception in 2000.

== Awards ==
Dobson was made a Member of the Order of Australia in 2010 for her service to public health and biostatistics as a research and academic, particularly through the collection and analysis of data relating to cardiovascular disease and women's and veterans' health, which provided a basis for public health interventions and policies to reduce disease burden in the population.

Dobson won the Sidney Sax medal in 2003, the pre-eminent prize awarded by the Public Health Association of Australia. Dobson received the 2012 Moyal Medal for her contributions to statistics and in 2015 she was elected Fellow of the Australian Academy of Health and Medical Sciences (FAHMS).

She is also an elected member of the International Statistical Institute.

== An introduction to GLM ==
She wrote the book An introduction to generalized linear models.

== Most highly cited publications ==
- Kuulasmaa K, Tunstall-Pedoe H, Dobson A, Fortmann S, Sans S, Tolonen H, Evans A, Ferrario M, Tuomilehto J. Estimation of contribution of changes in classic risk factors to trends in coronary-event rates across the WHO MONICA Project populations.
- Brown WJ, Bryson L, Byles JE, Dobson AJ, Lee C, Mishra G, Schofield M. Women's Health Australia: Recruitment for a national longitudinal cohort study.
