= Absolute risk =

Measure in clinical research

The group exposed to treatment (left) has 1/4 or 25% absolute risk of an adverse outcome (dark). The unexposed group (right) has 1/2 or 50% absolute risk of an adverse outcome.

Absolute risk (or AR) is the probability or chance of an event. It is usually used for the number of events (such as a disease) that occurred in a group, divided by the number of people in that group.

Absolute risk is one of the most understandable ways of communicating health risks to the general public.

In difference to absolute risk, the relative risk (RR) is the ratio of the probability of an outcome in an exposed group to the probability of the outcome in an unexposed group.

== See also ==
- Absolute risk reduction
- Relative risk reduction
