= Preventable fraction for the population =

Measure used in epidemiology

In epidemiology, preventable fraction for the population (PFp), is the proportion of incidents in the population that could be prevented by exposing the whole population. It is calculated as $PF_p = (I_p - I_e)/I_p$, where $I_e$ is the incidence in the exposed group, $I_p$ is the incidence in the population.

It is used when an exposure reduces the risk, as opposed to increasing it, in which case its symmetrical notion is attributable fraction for the population.

== See also ==
- Population Impact Measures
- Preventable fraction among the unexposed
