= TheNNT =

Drug treatment statistic website

theNNT
- Website: www.thennt.com
- Commercial: No

The theNNT is an evidence-based medicine website created by a small group led by David H. Newman and Graham Walker that collects statistical information about drugs, particularly the number needed to treat measure. The website was launched in 2010.
