= Case–control study =

Type of observational study comparing two existing groups differing in outcome

A case–control study (also known as case–referent study) is a type of observational study in which two existing groups differing in outcome are identified and compared on the basis of some supposed causal attribute. Case–control studies are often used to identify factors that may contribute to a medical condition by comparing subjects who have the condition with patients who do not have the condition but are otherwise similar. They require fewer resources but provide less evidence for causal inference than a randomized controlled trial. A case–control study is often used to produce an odds ratio. Some statistical methods make it possible to use a case–control study to also estimate relative risk, risk differences, and other quantities.

== Definition ==
Porta's Dictionary of Epidemiology defines the case–control study as: "an observational epidemiological study of persons with the disease (or another outcome variable) of interest and a suitable control group of persons without the disease (comparison group, reference group). The potential relationship of a suspected risk factor or an attribute to the disease is examined by comparing the diseased and nondiseased subjects with regard to how frequently the factor or attribute is present (or, if quantitative, the levels of the attribute) in each of the groups (diseased and nondiseased)."

The case–control study is frequently contrasted with cohort studies, wherein exposed and unexposed subjects are observed until they develop an outcome of interest.

=== Control group selection ===
Controls need not be in good health; inclusion of sick people is sometimes appropriate, as the control group should represent those at risk of becoming a case. Controls should come from the same population as the cases, and their selection should be independent of the exposures of interest.

Controls can carry the same disease as the experimental group, but of another grade/severity, therefore being different from the outcome of interest. However, because the difference between the cases and the controls will be smaller, this results in a lower power to detect an exposure effect.

As with any epidemiological study, greater numbers in the study will increase the power of the study. Numbers of cases and controls do not have to be equal. In many situations, it is much easier to recruit controls than to find cases. Increasing the number of controls above the number of cases, up to a ratio of about 4 to 1, may be a cost-effective way to improve the study.

=== Prospective vs. retrospective cohort studies ===
A prospective study watches for outcomes, such as the development of a disease, during the study period and relates this to other factors such as suspected risk or protection factor(s). The study usually involves taking a cohort of subjects and watching them over a long period. The outcome of interest should be common; otherwise, the number of outcomes observed will be too small to be statistically meaningful (indistinguishable from those that may have arisen by chance). All efforts should be made to avoid sources of bias such as the loss of individuals to follow up during the study. Prospective studies usually have fewer potential sources of bias and confounding than retrospective studies.

A retrospective study, on the other hand, looks backwards and examines exposures to suspected risk or protection factors in relation to an outcome that is established at the start of the study. Many valuable case–control studies, such as Lane and Claypon's 1926 investigation of risk factors for breast cancer, were retrospective investigations. Most sources of error due to confounding and bias are more common in retrospective studies than in prospective studies. For this reason, retrospective investigations are often criticised. If the outcome of interest is uncommon, however, the size of prospective investigation required to estimate relative risk is often too large to be feasible. In retrospective studies the odds ratio provides an estimate of relative risk. One should take special care to avoid sources of bias and confounding in retrospective studies.

== Strengths and weaknesses ==
Case–control studies are a relatively inexpensive and frequently used type of epidemiological study that can be carried out by small teams or individual researchers in single facilities in a way that more structured experimental studies often cannot be. They have pointed the way to a number of important discoveries and advances. The case–control study design is often used in the study of rare diseases or as a preliminary study where little is known about the association between the risk factor and disease of interest.

Compared to prospective cohort studies they tend to be less costly and shorter in duration. In several situations, they have greater statistical power than cohort studies, which must often wait for a 'sufficient' number of disease events to accrue.

Case–control studies are observational in nature and thus do not provide the same level of evidence as randomized controlled trials. The results may be confounded by other factors, to the extent of giving the opposite answer to better studies. A meta-analysis of what was considered 30 high-quality studies concluded that use of a product halved a risk, when in fact the risk was, if anything, increased. It may also be more difficult to establish the timeline of exposure to disease outcome in the setting of a case–control study than within a prospective cohort study design where the exposure is ascertained prior to following the subjects over time in order to ascertain their outcome status. The most important drawback in case–control studies relates to the difficulty of obtaining reliable information about an individual's exposure status over time. Case–control studies are therefore placed low in the hierarchy of evidence.

== Examples ==
One of the most significant triumphs of the case–control study was the demonstration of the link between tobacco smoking and lung cancer, by Richard Doll and Bradford Hill. They showed a statistically significant association in a large case–control study. Opponents argued for many years that this type of study cannot prove causation, but the eventual results of cohort studies confirmed the causal link which the case–control studies suggested, and it is now accepted that tobacco smoking is the cause of about 87% of all lung cancer mortality in the US.

== Analysis ==
Case–control studies were initially analyzed by testing whether or not there were significant differences between the proportion of exposed subjects among cases and controls. Subsequently, Cornfield pointed out that, when the disease outcome of interest is rare, the odds ratio of exposure can be used to estimate the relative risk (see rare disease assumption). The validity of the odds ratio depends highly on the nature of the disease studied, on the sampling methodology and on the type of follow-up. Although in classical case–control studies, it remains true that the odds ratio can only approximate the relative risk in the case of rare diseases, there is a number of other types of studies (case–cohort, nested case–control, cohort studies) in which it was later shown that the odds ratio of exposure can be used to estimate the relative risk or the incidence rate ratio of exposure without the need for the rare disease assumption.

When the logistic regression model is used to model the case–control data and the odds ratio is of interest, both the prospective and retrospective likelihood methods will lead to identical maximum likelihood estimations for covariate, except for the intercept. The usual methods of estimating more interpretable parameters than odds ratios—such as risk ratios, levels, and differences—is biased if applied to case–control data, but special statistical procedures provide easy to use consistent estimators.

== See also ==
- Nested case–control study
- Retrospective cohort study
- Prospective cohort study
- Randomized controlled trial
