= Attributable fraction for the population =

Epidemiology statistic

A quarter of the population is exposed to a risk factor (radiation hazard sign) and has a higher risk of an adverse outcome (dark). In the whole population, one ninth of the adverse outcomes can be attributed to the exposure (AF_{p} = 1/9).

In epidemiology, attributable fraction for the population (AFp) is the proportion of incidents in the population that are attributable to the risk factor. The term "attributable risk percent for the population" is used if the fraction is expressed as a percentage. It is calculated as $AF_p = (I_p - I_u)/I_p$, where $I_p$ is the incidence in the population, and $I_u$ is the incidence in the unexposed group.

Equivalently it can be calculated as $AF_p = \frac{P_e(RR - 1)}{1 + P_e(RR-1)}$, where $P_e$ is the exposed proportion of the population and $RR$ is the relative risk not adjusted for confounders.

It is used when an exposure increases the risk, as opposed to reducing it, in which case its symmetrical notion is preventable fraction for the population.

== Synonyms ==
Multiple synonyms of the attributable fraction for the population are in use: attributable proportion for the population, population attributable proportion, Levin's attributable risk, population attributable risk, and population attributable fraction.

Similarly, population attributable risk percent (PAR) is used as a synonym for the attributable risk percent for the population.

== Interpretation ==
Attributable fraction for the population combines both the relative risk of an incident with respect to the factor, as well as the prevalence of the factor in the population. Values of AF_{p} close to 1 indicate that both the relative risk is high, and that the risk factor is prevalent. In such case, removal of the risk factor will greatly reduce the number of the incidents in the population. The values of AF_{p} close to 0, on the other hand, indicate that either the relative risk is low, or that the factor is not prevalent (or both). Removal of such factor from the population will have little effect. Because of this interpretation, AF_{p} is considered useful for guiding public health policy.

For example, in 1953 Levin's paper estimated that lung cancer has a relative risk of 3.6–13.4 in smokers compared to non-smokers, and that the proportion of the population exposed to smoking was 0.5–0.96, resulting in the high AF_{p} value of 0.56–0.92. Recently, it has been shown that the population attributable fraction for anthropogenic risk factors strongly correlates with the number of oncogenic mutations in multiple cancer types, both sexes, and three countries – US, UK and Australia.

== Generalizations ==
Attributable fraction for the population can be generalized to the case where the multilevel exposure to the risk factor. In such case

$AF_p = \frac{\sum_i P_i RR_i - \sum_i P_i'RR_i}{\sum_i P_i RR_i}$ where $P_i$ is the proportion of the population exposed to the level $i$, $P_i'$ is the desired (ideal) proportion of the population exposed to the level $i$, and $RR_i$ is the relative risk at exposure level $i$.

== See also ==
- Population Impact Measures
- Attributable fraction among the exposed
