= Ratio =

Relationship between two numbers of the same kind

The ratio of width to height of standard-definition television

In mathematics, a ratio (/ˈreɪ.ʃ(i.)oʊ/) shows how many times one number contains another. For example, if there are eight oranges and six lemons in a bowl of fruit, then the ratio of oranges to lemons is eight to six (that is, 8:6, which is equivalent to the ratio 4:3). Similarly, the ratio of lemons to oranges is 6:8 (or 3:4) and the ratio of oranges to the total amount of fruit is 8:14 (or 4:7).

The numbers in a ratio may be quantities of any kind, such as counts of people or objects, or such as measurements of lengths, weights, time, etc. In most contexts, both numbers are restricted to be positive.

A ratio may be specified either by giving both constituting numbers, written as "a to b" or "a:b", or by giving just the value of their quotient a/b. Equal quotients correspond to equal ratios. A statement expressing the equality of two ratios is called a proportion, for example, 6:8 is proportional to 3:4.

Consequently, a ratio may be considered as an ordered pair of numbers, a fraction with the first number in the numerator and the second in the denominator, or as the value denoted by this fraction. Ratios of counts, given by (non-zero) natural numbers, are rational numbers, and may sometimes be natural numbers.

A more specific definition adopted in physical sciences (especially in metrology) for ratio is the dimensionless quotient between two physical quantities measured with the same unit. A quotient of two quantities that are measured with different units may be called a rate.

== Notation and terminology ==
The ratio of numbers A and B can be expressed as:

- the ratio of A to B
- A:B
- A is to B (when followed by "as C is to D"; see below)
- a fraction with A as numerator and B as denominator that represents the quotient (i.e., A divided by B, or $\tfrac{A}{B}$). This can be expressed as a simple or a decimal fraction, or as a percentage, etc.

When a ratio is written in the form A:B, the two-dot character is sometimes the colon punctuation mark. In Unicode, this is U+003A : COLON, although Unicode also provides a dedicated ratio character, U+2236 ∶ RATIO.

The numbers A and B are sometimes called terms of the ratio, with A being the antecedent and B being the consequent.

A statement expressing the equality of two ratios A:B and C:D is called a proportion, written as A:B = C:D or A:B∷C:D. This latter form, when spoken or written in the English language, is often expressed as

(A is to B) as (C is to D).

A, B, C and D are called the terms of the proportion. A and D are called its extremes, and B and C are called its means. The equality of three or more ratios, like A:B = C:D = E:F, is called a continued proportion.

Ratios are sometimes used with three or even more terms. E.g., the proportion for the edge lengths of a "two by four" that is ten inches long is:
$$\text{thickness : width : length } = 2:4:10$$
A good concrete mix (in volume units) is sometimes quoted as:
$$\text{cement : sand : gravel } = 1:2:4.$$
The meaning of such a proportion of ratios with more than two terms is that the ratio of any two terms on the left-hand side is equal to the ratio of the corresponding two terms on the right-hand side.

== History and etymology ==
It is possible to trace the origin of the word "ratio" to the ancient Greek λόγος (logos). Early translators rendered this into Latin as ratio ("reason"; as in the word "rational"). A more modern interpretation of Euclid's meaning is more akin to computation or reckoning. Medieval writers used the word proportio ("proportion") to indicate ratio and proportionalitas ("proportionality") for the equality of ratios.

Euclid collected the results appearing in the Elements from earlier sources. The Pythagoreans developed a theory of ratio and proportion as applied to numbers. The Pythagoreans' conception of number included only what would today be called rational numbers, casting doubt on the validity of the theory in geometry where, as the Pythagoreans also discovered, incommensurable ratios (corresponding to irrational numbers) exist. The discovery of a theory of ratios that does not assume commensurability is probably due to Eudoxus of Cnidus. The exposition of the theory of proportions that appears in Book VII of The Elements reflects the earlier theory of ratios of commensurables.

The existence of multiple theories seems unnecessarily complex since ratios are, to a large extent, identified with quotients and their prospective values. However, this is a comparatively recent development, as can be seen from the fact that modern geometry textbooks still use distinct terminology and notation for ratios and quotients. The reasons for this are twofold: first, there was the previously mentioned reluctance to accept irrational numbers as true numbers, and second, the lack of a widely used symbolism to replace the already established terminology of ratios delayed the full acceptance of fractions as alternative until the 16th century.

=== Euclid's definitions ===
Book V of Euclid's Elements has 18 definitions, all of which relate to ratios. In addition, Euclid uses ideas that were in such common usage that he did not include definitions for them. The first two definitions say that a part of a quantity is another quantity that "measures" it and conversely, a multiple of a quantity is another quantity that it measures. In modern terminology, this means that a multiple of a quantity is that quantity multiplied by an integer greater than one—and a part of a quantity (meaning aliquot part) is a part that, when multiplied by an integer greater than one, gives the quantity.

Euclid does not define the term "measure" as used here, However, one may infer that if a quantity is taken as a unit of measurement, and a second quantity is given as an integral number of these units, then the first quantity measures the second. These definitions are repeated, nearly word for word, as definitions 3 and 5 in book VII.

Definition 3 describes what a ratio is in a general way. It is not rigorous in a mathematical sense and some have ascribed it to Euclid's editors rather than Euclid himself. Euclid defines a ratio as between two quantities of the same type, so by this definition the ratios of two lengths or of two areas are defined, but not the ratio of a length and an area. Definition 4 makes this more rigorous. It states that a ratio of two quantities exists, when there is a multiple of each that exceeds the other. In modern notation, a ratio exists between quantities p and q, if there exist integers m and n such that mp>q and nq>p. This condition is known as the Archimedean property.

Definition 5 is the most complex and difficult. It defines what it means for two ratios to be equal. Today, this can be done by simply stating that ratios are equal when the quotients of the terms are equal, but such a definition would have been meaningless to Euclid. In modern notation, Euclid's definition of equality is that given quantities p, q, r and s, p:q∷r:s if and only if, for any positive integers m and n, np < mq, np = mq, or np > mq according as nr < ms, nr = ms, or nr > ms, respectively. This definition has affinities with Dedekind cuts as, with n and q both positive, np stands to mq as p/q stands to the rational number m/n (dividing both terms by nq).

Definition 6 says that quantities that have the same ratio are proportional or in proportion. Euclid uses the Greek ἀναλόγον (analogon), this has the same root as λόγος and is related to the English word "analog".

Definition 7 defines what it means for one ratio to be less than or greater than another and is based on the ideas present in definition 5. In modern notation it says that given quantities p, q, r and s, p:q > r:s if there are positive integers m and n so that np > mq and nr ≤ ms.

As with definition 3, definition 8 is regarded by some as being a later insertion by Euclid's editors. It defines three terms p, q and r to be in proportion when p:q∷q:r. This is extended to four terms p, q, r and s as p:q∷q:r∷r:s, and so on. Sequences that have the property that the ratios of consecutive terms are equal are called geometric progressions. Definitions 9 and 10 apply this, saying that if p, q and r are in proportion then p:r is the duplicate ratio of p:q and if p, q, r and s are in proportion then p:s is the triplicate ratio of p:q.

== Number of terms and use of fractions ==
In general, a comparison of the quantities of a two-entity ratio can be expressed as a fraction derived from the ratio. For example, in a ratio of 2:3, the amount, size, volume, or quantity of the first entity is $\tfrac{2}{3}$ that of the second entity.

If there are 2 oranges and 3 apples, the ratio of oranges to apples is 2:3, and the ratio of oranges to the total number of pieces of fruit is 2:5. These ratios can also be expressed in fraction form: there are 2/3 as many oranges as apples, and 2/5 of the pieces of fruit are oranges. If orange juice concentrate is to be diluted with water in the ratio 1:4, then one part of concentrate is mixed with four parts of water, giving five parts total; the amount of orange juice concentrate is 1/4 the amount of water, while the amount of orange juice concentrate is 1/5 of the total liquid. In both ratios and fractions, it is important to be clear what is being compared to what, and beginners often make mistakes for this reason.

Fractions can also be inferred from ratios with more than two entities; however, a ratio with more than two entities cannot be completely converted into a single fraction, because a fraction can only compare two quantities. A separate fraction can be used to compare the quantities of any two of the entities covered by the ratio: for example, from a ratio of 2:3:7 we can infer that the quantity of the second entity is $\tfrac{3}{7}$ that of the third entity.

== Proportions and percentage ratios ==
If we multiply all quantities involved in a ratio by the same number, the ratio remains valid. For example, a ratio of 3:2 is the same as 12:8. It is usual either to reduce terms to the lowest common denominator, or to express them in parts per hundred (percent).

If a mixture contains substances A, B, C and D in the ratio 5:9:4:2, then there are 5 parts of A for every 9 parts of B, 4 parts of C, and 2 parts of D. As 5 + 9 + 4 + 2 = 20, the total mixture contains 5/20 of A (5 parts out of 20), 9/20 of B, 4/20 of C, and 2/20 of D. If we divide all numbers by the total and multiply by 100, we have converted to percentages: 25% A, 45% B, 20% C, and 10% D (equivalent to writing the ratio as 25:45:20:10).

If the two or more ratio quantities encompass all of the quantities in a particular situation, it is said that "the whole" contains the sum of the parts: for example, a fruit basket containing two apples and three oranges and no other fruit is made up of two parts apples and three parts oranges. In this case, $\tfrac{2}{5}$, or 40% of the whole is apples and $\tfrac{3}{5}$, or 60% of the whole is oranges. This comparison of a specific quantity to "the whole" is called a proportion.

If the ratio consists of only two values, it can be represented as a fraction, in particular as a decimal fraction. For example, older televisions have a 4:3 aspect ratio, which means that the width is 4/3 of the height (this can also be expressed as 1.33:1 or just 1.33 rounded to two decimal places). More recent widescreen TVs have a 16:9 aspect ratio, or 1.78 rounded to two decimal places. One of the popular widescreen movie formats is 2.35:1 or simply 2.35. Representing ratios as decimal fractions simplifies their comparison. When comparing 1.33, 1.78 and 2.35, it is obvious which format offers wider image. Such a comparison works only when values being compared are consistent, like always expressing width in relation to height.

== Reduction ==
Ratios can be reduced (as fractions are) by dividing each quantity by the common factors of all the quantities. As for fractions, the simplest form is considered that in which the numbers in the ratio are the smallest possible integers.

Thus, the ratio 40:60 is equivalent in meaning to the ratio 2:3, the latter being obtained from the former by dividing both quantities by 20. Mathematically, we write 40:60 = 2:3, or equivalently 40:60∷2:3. The verbal equivalent is "40 is to 60 as 2 is to 3."

A ratio that has integers for both quantities and that cannot be reduced any further (using integers) is said to be in simplest form or lowest terms.

Sometimes it is useful to write a ratio in the form 1:x or x:1, where x is not necessarily an integer, to enable comparisons of different ratios. For example, the ratio 4:5 can be written as 1:1.25 (dividing both sides by 4) Alternatively, it can be written as 0.8:1 (dividing both sides by 5).

Where the context makes the meaning clear, a ratio in this form is sometimes written without the 1 and the ratio symbol (:), though, mathematically, this makes it a factor or multiplier.

== Irrational ratios ==
Ratios may also be established between incommensurable quantities (quantities whose ratio, as value of a fraction, amounts to an irrational number). The earliest discovered example, found by the Pythagoreans, is the ratio of the length of the diagonal d to the length of a side s of a square, which is the square root of 2, formally $a:d = 1:\sqrt{2}.$ Another example is the ratio of a circle's circumference to its diameter, which is called π, and is not just an irrational number, but a transcendental number.

Also well known is the golden ratio of two (mostly) lengths a and b, which is defined by the proportion

$a:b = (a+b):a \quad$ or, equivalently $\quad a:b = (1+b/a):1.$

Taking the ratios as fractions and $a:b$ as having the value x, yields the equation

$x=1+\tfrac 1x \quad$ or $\quad x^2-x-1 = 0,$

which has the positive, irrational solution $x=\tfrac{a}{b}=\tfrac{1+\sqrt{5}}{2}.$ Thus at least one of a and b has to be irrational for them to be in the golden ratio. An example of an occurrence of the golden ratio in math is as the limiting value of the ratio of two consecutive Fibonacci numbers: even though all these ratios are ratios of two integers and hence are rational, the limit of the sequence of these rational ratios is the irrational golden ratio.

Similarly, the silver ratio of a and b is defined by the proportion

$a:b = (2a+b):a \quad (= (2+b/a):1),$ corresponding to $x^2-2x-1 = 0.$

This equation has the positive, irrational solution $x = \tfrac{a}{b}=1+\sqrt{2},$ so again at least one of the two quantities a and b in the silver ratio must be irrational.

== Odds ==
Odds (as in gambling) are expressed as a ratio. For example, odds of "7 to 3 against" (7:3) mean that there are seven chances that the event will not happen to every three chances that it will happen. The probability of success is 30%. In every ten trials, there are expected to be three wins and seven losses.

== Units ==
Ratios may be unitless, as in the case they relate quantities in units of the same dimension, even if their units of measurement are initially different. For example, the ratio one minute : 40 seconds can be reduced by changing the first value to 60 seconds, so the ratio becomes 60 seconds : 40 seconds. Once the units are the same, they can be omitted, and the ratio can be reduced to 3:2. A ratio is sometimes called an "index", as in the index of refraction.

On the other hand, there are non-dimensionless quotients, also known as rates (sometimes also as ratios). In chemistry, mass concentration ratios are usually expressed as weight/volume fractions. For example, a concentration of 3% w/v usually means 3 g of substance in every 100 mL of solution. This cannot be converted to a dimensionless ratio, as in weight/weight or volume/volume fractions.

== Triangular coordinates ==
The locations of points relative to a triangle with vertices A, B, and C and sides AB, BC, and CA are often expressed in extended ratio form as triangular coordinates.

In barycentric coordinates, a point with coordinates α, β, γ is the point upon which a weightless sheet of metal in the shape and size of the triangle would exactly balance if weights were put on the vertices, with the ratio of the weights at A and B being α : β, the ratio of the weights at B and C being β : γ, and therefore the ratio of weights at A and C being α : γ.

In trilinear coordinates, a point with coordinates x :y :z has perpendicular distances to side BC (across from vertex A) and side CA (across from vertex B) in the ratio x :y, distances to side CA and side AB (across from C) in the ratio y :z, and therefore distances to sides BC and AB in the ratio x :z.

Since all information is expressed in terms of ratios (the individual numbers denoted by α, β, γ, x, y, and z have no meaning by themselves), a triangle analysis using barycentric or trilinear coordinates applies regardless of the size of the triangle.

== See also ==
- Cross ratio
- Dilution ratio
- Displacement–length ratio
- Dimensionless quantity
- Financial ratio
- Fold change
- Interval (music)
- Odds ratio
- Parts-per notation
- Price–performance ratio
- Proportionality (mathematics)
- Ratio distribution
- Ratio estimator
- Rate (mathematics)
- Ratio (Twitter)
- Rate ratio
- Relative risk
- Rule of three (mathematics)
- Scale (map)
- Scale (ratio)
- Sex ratio
- Superparticular ratio
- Slope
