= Christy Chuang-Stein =

Taiwanese-American statistician

Christy Chuang-Stein is a Taiwanese-American (Note: In an interview in the Journal of the International Association for Official Statistics, Chuang-Stein refers to herself as Chinese.) biostatistician who has worked in academia and in the pharmaceutical industry. She was elected as a fellow of the American Statistical Association (ASA) in 1998.

== Early life and education ==
Chuang-Stein was born and raised in Taiwan. Both of her parents were teachers; her mother taught her mathematics. After high school, she graduated from National Taiwan University with a B.S. in mathematics in 1975. She earned her Ph.D. in statistics from the University of Minnesota in 1980. Her doctoral dissertation, completed under Kinley Larntz and Stephen Fienberg, was titled, "Analysis of Categorical Data with Ordered Categories".

== Career ==
After obtaining her PhD, Chuang-Stein took a faculty position in the Cancer Center at the University of Rochester. She stayed at Rochester for five years and then, in 1985, joined the Upjohn Company in Kalamazoo, Michigan. Upjohn was eventually absorbed into Pfizer, where she spent the rest of her career. She retired from Pfizer in 2015 and formed her own consulting company. She is the author or co-author of more than 160 refereed papers, three textbooks on the application of biostatistics methods to pharmaceutical research and a number of chapters in books. She co-founded the journal Pharmaceutical Statistics.

== Recognition ==
Chuang-Stein was elected as a fellow of the American Statistical Association (ASA) in 1998. She was awarded the American Statistical Association Founders Award (2012) and the Distinguished Achievement Award of the International Chinese Statistical Association (2014). She has earned the Drug Information Association's (DIA) Donald E. Francke Award for Overall Excellence in Journal Publishing three times (2001, 2004, 2009) and DIA's Thomas Teal Award for Excellence in Statistics Publishing twice (2008, 2010). In 2004 she won the Recognition Award by the Clinical Leadership Committee of PhRMA.
