= NNV =

NNV may refer to:

- Natal Naval Volunteers, a British Royal Navy unit of the Boer War
- National Naval Volunteers, a United States Navy reserve force of the World War I period; see United States Navy Reserve
- Netherlands Physical Society (Dutch: Nederlandse Natuurkundige Vereniging)
- Norwegian Society for the Conservation of Nature (Norwegian: Norges Naturvernforbund), also known as Friends of the Earth Norway, the largest Norwegian environmental organization
- Number needed to vaccinate, a metric used in the evaluation of vaccines and in the determination of vaccination policy
