= Number needed to vaccinate =

Epidemiologic metric

Number needed to vaccinate (NNV) is a metric used in the evaluation of vaccines, and in the determination of vaccination policy. It is defined as the average number of patients that must be vaccinated to prevent one case of disease. It is a specific application of the number needed to treat metric (NNT).

== Derivation ==
NNV is the inverse of the absolute risk reduction of the vaccine. If the incidence in the vaccinated population is $I_e$, and the incidence in the unvaccinated population is $I_u$, then the NNV is $1/(I_u - I_e)$.

For example, one study reported a number needed to vaccinate of 5206 for invasive pneumococcal disease.

== Significance ==
In order to determine a NNV, it is necessary to identify a specific population and a defined endpoint, because these can vary:

- Tuberculosis vaccination rates are much higher in Europe than in the United States.
- When evaluating a vaccine against chickenpox, it is necessary to define whether or not the endpoint would include shingles due to reactivation.
- If evaluating a HIV vaccine, the NNV may vary depending upon the expected standard of care in the absence of a vaccine, which may vary from continent to continent.
- If an infectious disease is acute and highly lethal, there may be large differences in the impact of the vaccine upon incidence and prevalence.

Despite the limitations, the NNV can serve as a useful resource. For example, it can be used to report the results of computer simulations of varying vaccination strategies.

== See also ==
- Number needed to treat
