= Pharmaceutical Statistics (journal) =

Pharmaceutical Statistics is a peer-reviewed scientific journal that publishes papers related to pharmaceutical statistics. It is the official journal of Statisticians in the Pharmaceutical Industry and is published by John Wiley & Sons.

== Abstracting and indexing ==
Pharmaceutical Statistics is indexed in the following services:

- Current Index to Statistics
- MEDLINE
- Science Citation Index
- Science Citation Index Expanded
- Scopus
