= Protective factor =

Personal factors that help people cope

Protective factors are conditions or attributes (skills, strengths, resources, supports or coping strategies) in individuals, families, communities or the larger society that help people deal more effectively with stressful events and mitigate or eliminate risk in families and communities.

In the field of preventive medicine and health psychology, protective factors refer to any factor that decreases the chances of a negative health outcome occurring. Conversely, a risk factor will increase the chances of a negative health outcome occurring. Just as statistical correlations and regressions can examine how a range of independent variables impact a dependent variable, individuals can examine how many protective and risk factors contribute to the likelihood of an illness occurring.

== Adoption ==
Protective factors include:

- Adoptive parents having an accurate understanding of their adopted children's pre-adoption medical and behavioral problems
- Assistance of adoption professionals in the home of adopted children

Some risks that adopted children are prone to:

- Self-mutilation
- Delinquency
- Trouble with the law
- Substance abuse
- Thievery
- Early sexuality and promiscuity

== See also ==
- Epidemiology
- Medical statistics
- Risk factor
