= Jerome Cornfield =

American mathematician

Jerome Cornfield (1912–1979) was an American statistician. He is best known for his work in biostatistics, but his early work was in economic statistics and he was also an early contributor to the theory of Bayesian inference. He played a role in the early development of input-output analysis and linear programming. Cornfield played a crucial role in establishing the causal link between smoking and incidence of lung cancer. He introduced the Rare disease assumption and the "Cornfield condition" that allows one to assess whether an unmeasured (binary) confounder can explain away the observed relative risk due to some exposure like smoking.

He was born on October 30, 1912, in The Bronx, New York City. He graduated from New York University in 1933 and was briefly a graduate student at Columbia University. He also studied statistics and mathematics at the Graduate School of the US Department of Agriculture while employed by the Bureau of Labor Statistics, where he remained until 1947. He later worked at the National Cancer Institute, the Department of Biostatistics at Johns Hopkins School of Hygiene and Public Health, the National Heart Institute, the University of Pittsburgh, and George Washington University.

In 1974 he was elected as a Fellow of the American Statistical Association. He was the R. A. Fisher Lecturer in 1973 and President of the American Statistical Association in 1974.

Cornfield married Ruth Bittler in 1937. They had two daughters, Ann and Ellen.

He died on September 17, 1979, in Great Falls, Virginia.
