= Rare disease assumption =

Mathematical Assumption

The rare disease assumption is a mathematical assumption in epidemiologic case-control studies where the hypothesis tests the association between an exposure and a disease. It is assumed that, if the prevalence of the disease is low, then the odds ratio (OR) approaches the relative risk (RR). The idea was first demonstrated by Jerome Cornfield.

Case control studies are relatively inexpensive and less time-consuming than cohort studies. Since case control studies don't track patients over time, they can't establish relative risk. The case control study can, however, calculate the exposure-odds ratio, which, mathematically, is supposed to approach the relative risk as prevalence falls.

Sander Greenland showed that if the prevalence is 10% or less, the disease can be considered rare enough to allow the rare disease assumption. Unfortunately, the magnitude of discrepancy between the odds ratio and the relative risk is dependent not only on the prevalence, but also, to a great degree, on two other factors. Thus, the reliance on the rare disease assumption when discussing odds ratios as risk should be explicitly stated and discussed.

== Mathematical proof ==
Risk Ratio vs Odds Ratio depending on the baseline risk (prevalence) in the low risk group.

The rare disease assumption can be demonstrated mathematically using the definitions for relative risk and odds ratio.

	Disease Positive	Disease Negative
Exposure	a	b
No Exposure	c	d

With regards to the table above,

$Relative Risk = {a/(a+b)\over c/(c+d)}$ and $Odds Ratio = {{a/(a+c) \over c/(a+c)}\over {b/(b+d) \over d/(b+d)}} = {a/c \over b/d} = {ad \over bc}$

As prevalence decreases, the number of positive cases $(a+c)$ decreases. As $(a+c)$ approaches 0, then $a$ and $c$, individually, also approaches 0. In other words, as $(a+c)$ approaches 0,

$Relative Risk = {a/(a+b)\over c/(c+d)} \approx {a/(0+b)\over c/(0+d)} ={a/b\over c/d} = {ad\over bc} = Odds Ratio$.

== Examples ==
The following example illustrates one of the problems, which occurs when the effects are large because the disease is common in the exposed or unexposed group. Consider the following contingency table.

	Disease Positive	Disease Negative
Exposure	4	6
No Exposure	5	85

$RR = {4/(4+6)\over 5/(5+85)} = 7.2$ and $OR = {4/6 \over 5/85} = 11.3$

While the prevalence is only 9% (9/100), the odds ratio (OR) is equal to 11.3 and the relative risk (RR) is equal to 7.2. Despite fulfilling the rare disease assumption overall, the OR and RR can hardly be considered to be approximately the same. However, the prevalence in the exposed group is 40%, which means $a$ is not sufficiently small compared to $b$ and therefore $b \not\approx (a+b)$.

	Disease Positive	Disease Negative
Exposure	4	96
No Exposure	5	895

$RR = {4/(4+96)\over 5/(5+895)} = 7.2$ and $OR = {4/96 \over 5/895} = 7.46$

With a prevalence of 0.9% (9/1000) and no changes to the effect size (same RR as above), estimates for RR and OR converge. Sometimes the prevalence threshold for which the rare disease assumption holds may be much lower.
