= BenMAP =

The Environmental Benefits Mapping and Analysis Program (BenMAP) is an open source, Windows-based computer program created by the U.S. Environmental Protection Agency that estimates the health benefits from improvements in air quality. State, local and international users have used BenMAP to estimate the health benefits of improved air quality. BenMAP includes information users need to start performing a benefits analysis; advanced users can customize the program to meet their needs. Because BenMAP is based on a GIS, the results can be mapped for ease of presentation.

BenMAP can be used for:

- Generation of population/community level ambient pollution exposure maps;
- Comparison of benefits across multiple regulatory programs;
- Estimation of health impacts associated with exposure to existing air pollution concentrations;
- Estimation of health benefits of alternative ambient air quality standards;
- Performance of sensitivity analyses of health or valuation functions, or of other inputs; and
- Hypothetical, or “what-if,” type analyses.

A United Nations case study concluded that it had "proven to be a remarkable tool in helping decision-makers understand the health and economic implications of possible air pollution control policies."

In December 2013, the proprietary BenMAP 4 was rewritten as an open-source program and issued as BenMAP-Community Edition.

== Information ==
BenMAP is intended as a tool for estimating the health impacts, and associated economic values, associated with changes in ambient air pollution. It accomplishes this by running health impact functions, which relate a change in the concentration of a pollutant with a change in the incidence of a health endpoint.

Inputs to health impact functions typically include:

- the change in ambient air pollution level,
- health effect estimate,
- the baseline incidence rate of the health endpoint, and
- the exposed population.
- Air Pollution Change. The air quality change is calculated as the difference between the starting air pollution level, also called the baseline, and the air pollution level after some change, such as that caused by a regulation. In the case of particulate matter, this is typically estimated in micrograms per meter cubed (μg/m3).
- Mortality Effect Estimate. The mortality effect estimate is an estimate of the percentage change in mortality due to a one unit change in ambient air pollution. Epidemiological studies provide a source for effect estimates.
- Mortality Incidence. The mortality incidence rate is an estimate of the average number of people that die in a given population over a given period of time. For example, the mortality incidence rate might be the probability that a person will die in a given year. Mortality incidence rates and other health data are typically collected each country’s government. The World Health Organization is a good source for data.
- Exposed Population. The exposed population is the number of people affected by the air pollution reduction. The government census office is a source for this information. Private companies may collect this information and offer it for sale.

BenMAP also calculates the economic value of health impacts. After the calculation of the mortality change, these premature deaths can be valued by multiplying the change in mortality reduction by an estimate of the value of a statistical life:

Value of Statistical Life: The value of a statistical life is the economic value placed on eliminating the risk of one premature death.

BenMAP also serves as a Geographic Information System (GIS), allowing users to create, utilize, and visualize maps of air pollution, population, incidence rates, incidence rate changes, economic valuations, and other types of data.

== Users ==
Users may include scientists, policy analysts, and decision makers. Advanced users can explore options such as using the map querying features and exploring the impacts of different health impact and valuation functions.
