= Number needed to treat =

Epidemiological measure

Group exposed to a treatment (left) has reduced risk of an adverse outcome (dark) compared to the unexposed group (right). 4 individuals need to be treated to prevent 1 adverse outcome (NNT = 4).

The number needed to treat (NNT) or number needed to treat for an additional beneficial outcome (NNTB) is an epidemiological measure used in communicating the effectiveness of a health-care intervention, typically a treatment with medication. The NNT is the average number of patients who need to be treated to prevent one additional bad outcome. It is defined as the inverse of the absolute risk reduction, and computed as $1/(I_u - I_e)$, where $I_u$ is the incidence in the control (unexposed) group, and $I_e$ is the incidence in the treated (exposed) group. This calculation implicitly assumes monotonicity, that is, no individual can be harmed by treatment. The modern approach, based on counterfactual conditionals, relaxes this assumption and yields bounds on NNT.

A type of effect size, the NNT was described in 1988 by McMaster University's Laupacis, Sackett and Roberts. While theoretically, the ideal NNT is 1, where everyone improves with treatment and no one improves with control, in practice, NNT is always rounded up to the nearest round number and so even a NNT of 1.1 becomes a NNT of 2 . A higher NNT indicates that treatment is less effective.

NNT is similar to number needed to harm (NNH), where NNT usually refers to a therapeutic intervention and NNH to a detrimental effect or risk factor. A combined measure, the number needed to treat for an additional beneficial or harmful outcome (NNTB/H), is also used.

== Relevance ==
The NNT is an important measure in pharmacoeconomics. If a clinical endpoint is devastating enough (e.g. death, heart attack), drugs with a high NNT may still be indicated in particular situations. If the endpoint is minor, health insurers may decline to reimburse drugs with a high NNT. NNT is significant to consider when comparing possible side effects of a medication against its benefits. For medications with a high NNT, even a small incidence of adverse effects may outweigh the benefits. Even though NNT is an important measure in a clinical trial, it is infrequently included in medical journal articles reporting the results of clinical trials. There are several important problems with the NNT, involving bias and lack of reliable confidence intervals, as well as difficulties in excluding the possibility of no difference between two treatments or groups.

NNT may vary substantially over time, and hence convey different information as a function of the specific time-point of its calculation. Snapinn and Jiang showed examples where the information conveyed by the NNT may be incomplete or even contradictory compared to the traditional statistics of interest in survival analysis. A comprehensive research on adjustment of the NNT for explanatory variables and accommodation to time-dependent outcomes was conducted by Bender and Blettner, Austin, and Vancak et al.

== Explanation of NNT in practice ==
There are a number of factors that can affect the meaning of the NNT depending on the situation. The treatment may be a drug in the form of a pill or injection, a surgical procedure, or many other possibilities. The following examples demonstrate how NNT is determined and what it means. In this example, it is important to understand that every participant has the condition being treated, so there are only "diseased" patients who received the treatment or did not. This is typically a type of study that would occur only if both the control and the tested treatment carried significant risks of serious harm, or if the treatment was unethical for a healthy participant (for example, chemotherapy drugs or a new method of appendectomy - surgical removal of the appendix). Most drug trials test both the control and the treatment on both healthy and "diseased" participants. Or, if the treatment's purpose is to prevent a condition that is fairly common (an anticoagulant to prevent heart attack for example), a prospective study may be used. A study which starts with all healthy participants is termed a prospective study, and is in contrast to a retrospective study, in which some participants already have the condition in question. Prospective studies produce much higher quality evidence, but are much more difficult and time-consuming to perform.

In the table below:

- $I_e$ is the probability of seeing no improvement after receiving the treatment (this is 1 minus the probability of seeing improvement with the treatment). This measure applies only to the treated group.
- $I_u$ is the probability of seeing no improvement after receiving the control (this is 1 minus the probability of seeing improvement with only the control). This measure applies only to the control (unexposed) group. The control group may receive a placebo treatment, or in cases where the goal is to find evidence that a new treatment is more effective than an existing treatment, the control group will receive the existing treatment. The meaning of the NNT is dependent on whether the control group received a placebo treatment or an existing treatment, and, in cases where a placebo treatment is given, the NNT is also affected to the quality of the placebo (i.e. for participants, is the placebo completely indistinguishable from the tested treatment.

Description	$I_e$	$I_u$	NNT	Interpretation
Perfect treatment, previously untreatable condition with no placebo effect involved	0.0	1.0	1	Half of participants receive the treatment, and half receive a control (which may be simply a placebo, or may be an existing treatment with a known effectiveness). Every person that receives the treatment shows improvement, which may be a reduction or halt in worsening of the condition, an improvement in the condition, or an outright cure of the condition. Every person in the control group shows no improvement, therefore the condition never improves on its own and the control is never effective. NNT is 1/(1.0-0.0), which is 1.
Very effective treatment with large improvement over control	0.1	0.9	1.25	For simplicity, a low number of participants will be used, though scientific studies almost always require many more. Ten people receive the treatment, and ten receive a control. Of the ten in the treated group, nine show improvement, and one shows no improvement. In the control group, one person shows improvement and nine show none. Since one of those who received the control showed improvement without the treatment, it is said that one of the nine from the treated group would have improved without receiving the treatment. Therefore, one person’s outcome does not represent evidence that the treatment is better than the control. NNT is 1/(0.9-0.1), which is 1.25. The absolute risk reduction is 0.9-0.1, equal to 0.8.
Effective treatment with moderate improvement over control	0.3	0.7	2.5	Ten receive the treatment, and ten receive a control. In the treatment group, seven show improvement and three show none. In the control group, three show improvement and seven show none. Therefore, the treatment was more helpful than the control in four of ten cases (7 treated improved minus 3 controls improved), and was not any more helpful in six of ten cases (3 not improved despite treatment, 3 that would have improved anyway as seen in the control group). NNT is 1/(0.7 – 0.3), which is 2.5.
Effective treatment, but little improvement over control	0.4	0.5	10	Ten receive the treatment, and ten receive a control. In the treatment group six improve with the treatment, and four do not. In the control group, five improve and five do not. Therefore, the treatment was more helpful than the control in only one of ten cases (6 treated improved minus 5 controls improved), and was not helpful is nine of ten (4 not improved despite treatment, 5 that would have improved anyway as seen in the control group). NNT is 1/(0.5 – 0.4), which is 10.
Not very effective treatment with little improvement over control	0.8	0.9	10	Ten receive the treatment, and ten receive a control. Two improve with the treatment and eight do not. In the control group, one improves and nine do not. Therefore, the treatment was more helpful than the control in only one of ten cases, and was not helpful is nine of ten. NNT is 1/(0.9 – 0.8), which is 10.
Apparently very effective treatment, but with little real improvement over control	0.1	0.2	10	Ten receive the treatment, and ten receive a control. Nine improve with the treatment and one does not. In the control group, eight improve and two do not. Therefore, the treatment was more helpful than the control in only one of ten cases, and was not helpful is nine of ten. NNT is 1/(0.2 – 0.1), which is 10.
Treatment is very effective but worse than control	0.2	0.1	−10	Ten receive the treatment, and ten receive a control. Eight improve with the treatment and two do not. In the control group, nine improve and one does not. Therefore, the treatment was less helpful than the control in one of ten cases. NNT is 1/(0.1 – 0.2), which is -10. Notice that, even though the treatment was effective in eight of ten cases (only one less than the previous example) the NNT has shifted from 10 to -10. This is because NNT measures how many patients must be given the treatment instead of the control in order to see improvement in one person. Since giving the treatment to ten people would cause one of those people to be worse than if they had received the control instead, the NNT is -10. If control is placebo, giving placebo appear better than to give treatment.

== Real-life example ==
ASCOT-LLA manufacturer-sponsored study addressed the benefit of atorvastatin 10 mg (a cholesterol-lowering drug) in patients with hypertension (high blood pressure) but no previous cardiovascular disease (primary prevention). The trial ran for 3.3 years, and during this period the relative risk of a "primary event" (heart attack) was reduced by 36% (relative risk reduction, RRR). The absolute risk reduction (ARR), however, was much smaller, because the study group did not have a very high rate of cardiovascular events over the study period: 2.67% in the control group, compared to 1.65% in the treatment group. Taking atorvastatin for 3.3 years, therefore, would lead to an ARR of only 1.02% (2.67% minus 1.65%). The number needed to treat to prevent one cardiovascular event would then be 98.04 for 3.3 years.

== Numerical example ==
Example of risk reduction
Quantity	Experimental group (E)	Control group (C)	Total
Events (E)	EE = 15	CE = 100	115
Non-events (N)	EN = 135	CN = 150	285
Total subjects (S)	ES = EE + EN = 150	CS = CE + CN = 250	400
Event rate (ER)	EER = EE / ES = 0.1, or 10%	CER = CE / CS = 0.4, or 40%	—

Variable	Abbr.	Formula	Value
Absolute risk reduction	ARR	CER − EER	0.3, or 30%
Number needed to treat	NNT	1 / (CER − EER)	3.33
Relative risk (risk ratio)	RR	EER / CER	0.25
Relative risk reduction	RRR	(CER − EER) / CER, or 1 − RR	0.75, or 75%
Preventable fraction among the unexposed	PFu	(CER − EER) / CER	0.75
Odds ratio	OR	(EE / EN) / (CE / CN)	0.167

== Modern Approach to NNT ==
The above calculations for NNT are valid under monotonicity, where treatment can't have a negative effect on any individual. However, in the case where the treatment may benefit some individuals and harm others, the NNT as defined above cannot be estimated from a Randomized Controlled Trial (RCT) alone. The inverse of the absolute risk reduction only provides an upper bound, i.e., $\text{NNT} \leqslant 1/(I_u - I_e)$.

The modern approach defines NNT literally, as the number of patients one needs to treat (on the average) before saving one. However, since "saving" is a counterfactual notion (a patient must recover if treated and not recover if not treated) the logic of counterfactuals must be invoked to estimate this quantity from experimental or observational studies. The probability of "saving" is captured by the Probability of Necessity and Sufficiency (PNS), where $\text{PNS} = P(\text{Recovery if and only if treated})$. Once PNS is estimated, NNT is given as $\text{NNT} = \text{PNS}^{-1}$. However, due to the counterfactual nature of PNS, only bounds can be computed from an RCT, rather than a precise estimate. Tian and Pearl have derived tight bounds on PNS, based on multiple data sources, and Pearl showed that a combination of observational and experimental data may sometimes make the bounds collapse to a point estimate. Mueller and Pearl provide a conceptual interpretation for this phenomenon and illustrate its impact on both individual and policy-makers decisions.

== See also ==
- Population Impact Measures
- Number needed to vaccinate
- Number needed to harm
- Pharmacoeconomics
