= Statisticians in the Pharmaceutical Industry =

Statisticians in the Pharmaceutical Industry, abbreviated to PSI, is an organisation for the promotion of statistical thinking in order to improve the quality of research and development in the pharmaceutical industry.

== History ==
PSI is a non-profit organisation formed in 1977, which was later converted to a company limited by guarantee, a process which was completed in January 2003. PSI achieves its vision by providing a forum for regular discussion of statistics and matters relating to the practice of statistics in the pharmaceutical industry, as well as promoting good statistical practice within the industry.

PSI's membership is around 1000 statisticians from across the Pharmaceutical Industry and academia. About 80% of these are UK-based. PSI hosts an annual three-day conference for its members, as well as several one-day meetings and training courses. It publishes a quarterly newsletter "SPIN" and sponsors the international journal "Pharmaceutical Statistics", published by John Wiley & Sons.

PSI is a member of the European Federation of Statisticians in the Pharmaceutical Industry (EFSPI).

== PSI Conference ==
PSI has held an annual conference every year since 1978. In its early years, the conference was typically held at an English university, but later moved to hotel conference facilities. The first conference to be held outside the United Kingdom was in 2008, but since then the venue has tended to alternate between the UK and other European venues outside the UK. The full list of conference locations is shown below:

The PSI annual conference
Year	Location	PSI Chair
1978	The Falcon Hotel, Stratford-upon-Avon	Jorgen Seldrup, Geigy
1979	University of Oxford, Jesus College, Oxford	John Lewis, ICI
1980	University of Cambridge, Newnham College, Cambridge	John Lewis, ICI
1981	University of Nottingham, Lincoln Hall, Nottingham	Alan Ebbutt, Ciba-Geigy
1982	University of York, Wentworth College, York	Chris Hallett, Roche
1983	University of Bristol, Wills Hall, Bristol	Chris Hallett, Roche
1984	University of Oxford, St Hilda's College, Oxford	David Robinson, Glaxo
1985	University of Sheffield, Sorby Hall, Sheffield	David Robinson, Glaxo
1986	University of Southampton, The Murray Building, Southampton	John Shelton, Searle
1987	The Cairn Hotel, Harrogate	John Shelton, Searle
1988	The Prince of Wales Hotel, Southport	Richard Hews, Pfizer
1989	Atlantic Tower Hotel, Liverpool	Cynthia Haliburn, SK&F Labs
1990	The Viking Hotel, York	Alec Vardy, Duphar
1991	The Grand Hotel, Bristol	Alec Vardy, Duphar
1992	Hospitality Inn, Brighton	Phil Poole, Sterling Winthrop
1993	The Grand Hotel, Bristol	Phil Poole, Pfizer
1994	Hilton National Hotel, Coventry	Mick Godley, Zeneca
1995	The Imperial Hotel, Blackpool	Mick Godley, Zeneca
1996	De Vere Royal Bath Hotel, Bournemouth	David Morgan, HMR
1997	Stratford Moat House Hotel, Stratford-upon-Avon	David Morgan, HMR
1998	The Old Swan Hotel, Harrogate	Andy Grieve, Pfizer
1999	De Vere Grand Harbour Hotel, Southampton	Andy Grieve, Pfizer
2000	Stakis Metropole Hotel, Brighton	John Chapman, Quintiles
2001	Carden Park Hotel, Chester	John Chapman, Serono
2002	Sopwell House Hotel, St Albans	Sue McKeown, Procter & Gamble
2003	Tortworth Court Hotel, Wotton-under-Edge	Sue McKeown, Procter & Gamble
2004	Carden Park Hotel, Chester	Kerry Gordon, Quintiles
2005	City Hall, Cardiff (Joint meeting with Royal Statistical Society)	Kerry Gordon, Quintiles
2006	Tortworth Court Hotel, Wotton-under-Edge	Paul Worthington, Chiltern International
2007	Carden Park Hotel, Chester	Paul Worthington, Takeda
2008	The Hotel, Brussels (Joint meeting with EFSPI)	Sara Hughes, GlaxoSmithKline
2009	Hilton Metropole Hotel, Brighton	Sara Hughes, GlaxoSmithKline
2010	Midland Hotel, Manchester	Stephen Pyke, Pfizer
2011	Cotswold Water Park, South Cerney	Stephen Pyke, Pfizer
2012	The Belfry, Sutton Coldfield	Katherine Hutchinson, Quanticate
2013	Grand Central Hotel, Glasgow	Katherine Hutchinson, Quanticate
2014	The Tower Hotel, London	Robert Cuffe, ViiV Healthcare
2015	Millennium Gloucester Hotel, London	Robert Cuffe, ViiV Healthcare
2016	Pullman Hotel, Berlin	Mark Morris, Conatus Pharmaceuticals
2017	Grange Tower Bridge Hotel, London	Nigel Howitt, Covance
2018	Beurs van Berlage, Amsterdam	Nigel Howitt, Covance
2019	Queen Elizabeth II Centre, London	Nigel Howitt, Covance
2020	Webinar Series	Lucy Rowell, Roche
2021	Online Conference	Lucy Rowell, Roche
2022	Gothia Towers, Gothenburg	Chrissie Fletcher, GSK
2023	Novotel London West, London	Chrissie Fletcher, GSK
2024		

== Footnotes ==
1. The abbreviation PSI is chosen in preference to the more literal SPI to avoid connotations with the word "spy", and to tie in with the Greek letter Ψ - Greek letters playing a substantial part in statistics. Ψ was the original logo of PSI.
2. The 2020 conference had been scheduled to take place in Barcelona but was changed to a Webinar series because of the COVID-19 pandemic.
