= Population impact measure =

Population impact measures (PIMs) are biostatistical measures of risk and benefit used in epidemiological and public health research. They are used to describe the impact of health risks and benefits in a population, to inform health policy.

Frequently used measures of risk and benefit identified by Jekel, Katz and Elmore, describe measures of risk difference (attributable risk), rate difference (often expressed as the odds ratio or relative risk), population attributable risk (PAR), and the relative risk reduction, which can be recalculated into a measure of absolute benefit, called the number needed to treat. Population impact measures are an extension of these statistics, as they are measures of absolute risk at the population level, which are calculations of number of people in the population who are at risk to be harmed, or who will benefit from public health interventions.

They are measures of absolute risk and benefit, producing numbers of people who will benefit from an intervention or be at risk from a risk factor within a particular local or national population. They provide local context to previous measures, allowing policy-makers to identify and prioritise the potential benefits of interventions on their own population. They are simple to compute, and contain the elements to which policy-makers would have to pay attention in the commissioning or improvement of services. They may have special relevance for local policy-making. They depend on the ability to obtain and use local data, and by being explicit about the data required may have the added benefit of encouraging the collection of such data.

== Measures ==
To describe the impact of preventive and treatment interventions, the number of events prevented in a population (NEPP) is defined as "the number of events prevented by the intervention in a population over a defined time period". NEPP extends the well-known measure number needed to treat (NNT) beyond the individual patient to the population. To describe the impact of a risk factor on causing ill health and disease the Population Impact Number of Eliminating a Risk factor (PIN-ER-t) is defined as "the potential number of disease events prevented in a population over the next t years by eliminating a risk factor". The PIN-ER-t extends the well-known population attributable risk (PAR) to a particular population and relates it to disease incidence, converting the PAR from a measure of relative to absolute risk.

The components for the calculations are as follows: population denominator (size of the population); proportion of the population with the disease; proportion of the population exposed to the risk factor or the incremental proportion of the diseased population eligible for the proposed intervention (the latter requires the actual or estimated proportion who are currently receiving the interventions 'subtracted' from best practice goal from guidelines or targets, adjusted for likely compliance with the intervention); baseline risk – the probability of the outcome of interest in this or similar populations; and relative risk of outcome given exposure to a risk factor or relative risk reduction associated with the intervention.

=== NEPP ===
The formula for calculating the NEPP is

$$\text{NEPP} = N \times P_d \times P_e \times r_u \times \text{RRR}$$

where

- N = population size,
- P_{d} = prevalence of the disease,
- P_{e} = proportion eligible for treatment,
- r_{u} = risk of the event of interest in the untreated group or baseline risk over appropriate time period (this can be multiplied by life expectancy to produce life-years),
- RRR = relative risk reduction associated with treatment.

In order to reflect the incremental effect of changing from current to 'best' practice, and to adjust for levels of compliance, the proportion eligible for treatment, P_{e}, is $(P_b - P_t)P_c$, where P_{t} is the proportion currently treated, P_{b} is the proportion that would be treated if best practice were adopted, and P_{c} is the proportion of the population who are compliant with the intervention.

[Note: number needed to treat (NNT): 1/(baseline risk x relative risk reduction)]

=== PIN-ER-t ===
The formula for calculating the PIN-ER-t is

$$\text{PIN-ER-}t = N \cdot I_p \cdot \text{PAR}$$

where

- N is the number of people in the population;
- I_{p} is the baseline risk of the outcome of interest in the population as a whole;
- t is the amount of time over which the outcome is measured.

The PAR or PAF, population attributable risk (or fraction), is calculated for two or multiple strata. The basic formula to compute the PAR for dichotomous variables is

$$\text{PAR} = P_e \frac{\text{RR}-1}{1 + P_e(\text{RR} - 1)}$$

where

- P_{e} is the prevalence of the population within each income stratum as the exposure, and
- RR is the prevalence of risk factors in each stratum relative to the highest income fifth.

This is modified where there are multiple strata to:

$$\text{PAR} = \frac{P_{e1} (\text{RR}_1-1) + P_{e2} ( \text{RR}_2-1) + P_{e3} (\text{RR}_3-1) + \cdots}{
1 + P_{e1}(\text{RR}_1-1) + P_{e2}(\text{RR}_2-1) + P_{e3}(\text{RR}_3-1) + \cdots}$$
