= BCA Master of Biostatistics =

The BCA (Biostatistics Collaboration of Australia) is a collaboration of five Australian universities offering a national (and international) program of postgraduate courses in Biostatistics.

The universities are

- The University of Adelaide
- Monash University
- The University of Queensland
- The University of Sydney
- The University of Melbourne is an Affiliated Member, where the program is full time on campus and some BCA Units are included.

Courses are taught online. Students enrol at their chosen participating university and each unit of study is delivered by a member university.

The BCA Graduate Diploma and Masters Programs are accredited by the Statistical Society of Australia.

NSW Ministry of Health and the BCA have an ongoing partnership associated the NSW Biostatistics Training Program. Students in this program complete the Masters of Biostatistics at the University of Sydney.

== See also ==
- Clinical Biostatistics
