= Rate ratio =

Measure used in epidemiology

In epidemiology, a rate ratio, sometimes called an incidence density ratio or incidence rate ratio, is a relative difference measure used to compare the incidence rates of events occurring at any given point in time.

It is defined as:

$\text{Rate Ratio} = \frac{\text{Incidence Rate 1}}{\text{Incidence Rate 2}}$

where incidence rate is the occurrence of an event over person-time (for example person-years):

$$\text{Incidence Rate} = \frac{\text{events}}{\text{person time}}$$

The same time intervals must be used for both incidence rates.

A common application for this measure in analytic epidemiologic studies is in the search for a causal association between a certain risk factor and an outcome.

== See also ==
- Odds ratio
- Ratio
- Risk ratio
