= Risk difference =

Measure in clinical research

The adverse outcome (dark) risk difference between the group exposed to the treatment (left) and the group unexposed to the treatment (right) is −0.25 (RD = −0.25, ARR = 0.25).

The risk difference (RD), excess risk, or attributable risk is the difference between the risk of an outcome in the exposed group and the unexposed group. It is computed as $I_e - I_u$, where $I_e$ is the incidence in the exposed group, and $I_u$ is the incidence in the unexposed group. If the risk of an outcome is increased by the exposure, the term absolute risk increase (ARI) is used, and computed as $I_e - I_u$. Equivalently, if the risk of an outcome is decreased by the exposure, the term absolute risk reduction (ARR) is used, and computed as $I_u - I_e$.

The inverse of the absolute risk reduction is the number needed to treat, and the inverse of the absolute risk increase is the number needed to harm.

== Usage in reporting ==
It is recommended to use absolute measurements, such as risk difference, alongside the relative measurements, when presenting the results of randomized controlled trials. Their utility can be illustrated by the following example of a hypothetical drug which reduces the risk of colon cancer from 1 case in 5000 to 1 case in 10,000 over one year. The relative risk reduction is 0.5 (50%), while the absolute risk reduction is 0.0001 (0.01%). The absolute risk reduction reflects the low probability of getting colon cancer in the first place, while reporting only relative risk reduction, would run into risk of readers exaggerating the effectiveness of the drug.

Authors such as Ben Goldacre believe that the risk difference is best presented as a natural number - drug reduces 2 cases of colon cancer to 1 case if you treat 10,000 people. Natural numbers, which are used in the number needed to treat approach, are easily understood by non-experts.

== Inference ==
Risk difference can be estimated from a 2x2 contingency table:

	Group	
	Experimental (E)	Control (C)
Events (E)	EE	CE
Non-events (N)	EN	CN

The point estimate of the risk difference is

$$RD = \frac{EE}{EE + EN} - \frac{CE}{CE + CN}.$$

The sampling distribution of RD is approximately normal, with standard error

$$SE(RD) = \sqrt{\frac{EE\cdot EN}{(EE + EN)^3} + \frac{CE\cdot CN}{(CE + CN)^3}}.$$

The $1 - \alpha$ confidence interval for the RD is then

$$CI_{1 - \alpha}(RD) = RD\pm SE(RD)\cdot z_\alpha,$$

where $z_\alpha$ is the standard score for the chosen level of significance

== Bayesian interpretation ==
We could assume a disease noted by $D$, and no disease noted by $\neg D$, exposure noted by $E$, and no exposure noted by $\neg E$. The risk difference can be written as

$$RD = P(D\mid E)-P(D\mid \neg E).$$

== Numerical examples ==
=== Risk reduction ===
Example of risk reduction
Quantity	Experimental group (E)	Control group (C)	Total
Events (E)	EE = 15	CE = 100	115
Non-events (N)	EN = 135	CN = 150	285
Total subjects (S)	ES = EE + EN = 150	CS = CE + CN = 250	400
Event rate (ER)	EER = EE / ES = 0.1, or 10%	CER = CE / CS = 0.4, or 40%	—

Variable	Abbr.	Formula	Value
Absolute risk reduction	ARR	CER − EER	0.3, or 30%
Number needed to treat	NNT	1 / (CER − EER)	3.33
Relative risk (risk ratio)	RR	EER / CER	0.25
Relative risk reduction	RRR	(CER − EER) / CER, or 1 − RR	0.75, or 75%
Preventable fraction among the unexposed	PFu	(CER − EER) / CER	0.75
Odds ratio	OR	(EE / EN) / (CE / CN)	0.167

=== Risk increase ===
Example of risk increase
Quantity	Experimental group (E)	Control group (C)	Total
Events (E)	EE = 75	CE = 100	175
Non-events (N)	EN = 75	CN = 150	225
Total subjects (S)	ES = EE + EN = 150	CS = CE + CN = 250	400
Event rate (ER)	EER = EE / ES = 0.5, or 50%	CER = CE / CS = 0.4, or 40%	—

Variable	Abbr.	Formula	Value
Absolute risk increase	ARI	EER − CER	0.1, or 10%
Number needed to harm	NNH	1 / (EER − CER)	10
Relative risk (risk ratio)	RR	EER / CER	1.25
Relative risk increase	RRI	(EER − CER) / CER, or RR − 1	0.25, or 25%
Attributable fraction among the exposed	AF_{e}	(EER − CER) / EER	0.2
Odds ratio	OR	(EE / EN) / (CE / CN)	1.5

== See also ==
- Population Impact Measures
- Relative risk reduction
