= Experimental event rate =

In epidemiology and biostatistics, the experimental event rate (EER) is a measure of how often a particular statistical event (such as response to a drug, adverse event or death) occurs within the experimental group (non-control group) of an experiment.

This value is very useful in determining the therapeutic benefit or risk to patients in experimental groups, in comparison to patients in placebo or traditionally treated control groups.

Three statistical terms rely on EER for their calculation: absolute risk reduction, relative risk reduction and number needed to treat.

== Control event rate ==
The control event rate (CER) is identical to the experimental event rate except that is measured within the scientific control group of an experiment.

== See also ==
- Absolute risk reduction
- Relative risk reduction
- Number needed to treat
