= Cathryn Tonne =

Urban air pollution researcher

- Education: Harvard T.H. Chan School of Public Health (PhD); Columbia University Mailman School of Public Health (MPH); University of California, Berkeley (BS)
- Awards: Tony McMichael Mid-Term Career Award
- Scientific career
- Fields: Urban air pollution
- Workplaces: London School of Hygiene & Tropical Medicine; Barcelona Institute for Global Health

Cathryn Tonne is an environmental epidemiologist whose research focuses on urban air pollution. She currently serves as co-director of The Lancet and Wellcome Trust's Countdown Europe initiative, which coordinates research on climate change and human health. In that role, she has called for harmonizing climate policies between European nations through the European Union and recognizing how emissions from Northern Europe disproportionately affect other countries.

Tonne completed her undergraduate studies at the University of California, Berkeley, master's degree at the Columbia University Mailman School of Public Health, and PhD at the Harvard T.H. Chan School of Public Health. Currently working at the Barcelona Institute for Global Health, Tonne's research focuses on the health effects of urban air pollution, such as the association between exposure to vehicle emissions and acute myocardial infarction.

In September 2022, the International Society for Environmental Epidemiology awarded Tonne the Tony McMichael Mid-Term Career Award for her work, which highlights that climate change mitigation also benefits human health, rather than simply avoiding heat waves and natural disasters.
