= Tanya Alderete =

American researcher

Tanya L. Alderete is an American multidisciplinary environmental and health researcher primarily studying the effects of exposure to pollution on humans. She is an associate professor at Johns Hopkins University in the department of Environmental Health and Engineering. Her work has been recognized with a mid-career award from the International Society for Environmental Epidemiology.

== Education and career ==
Alderete grew up in California's Central Valley, and was a first generation student. She received a Bachelors of Arts (BA) degree in Biology, Chemistry and Neuroscience from the University of Pennsylvania in 2005. In 2014, she received a PhD in Systems Biology of Disease from the University of Southern California, where she continued her studies as a postdoctoral research scholar at Environmental Health Sciences Center through 2018. While there she was co-author of a study that found fructose in breast milk, which correlated to higher infant weight. Since fructose isn't naturally found in breast milk, Alderete and her co-authors theorized it could result from foods with added sugar that mothers consumed and could put their children at risk for obesity later in life.

From August 2018 to April 2024, Alderete held a position as assistant professor of data science and biostatistics at the University of Colorado, Boulder, where her studies focused on health disparities in historically underrepresented populations. She then moved to Johns Hopkins University where she is an associate professor in the Bloomberg School of Public Health, and is lead investigator for Eclipse Lab, which studies how environmental exposures contribute to obesity and metabolic diseases such as type 2 diabetes, with the goal of guiding public policies to reduce these harmful exposures. She also co-leads Project 1 of the Southern California Center for Chronic Health Disparities in Latino Families and Children.

== Honors and awards ==
- Tony McMichael Mid-Term Career Award from the International Society for Environmental Epidemiology (2024)
- Provost Faculty Achievement Award, University of Colorado, Boulder (2023)
