= Rotterdam Study =

Medical study established in Rotterdam in 1990

The Rotterdam Study or ERGO (Dutch: Erasmus Rotterdam Gezondheid Onderzoek) is a prospective, population-based cohort study. The aim of the Rotterdam Study is to investigate etiology, preclinical phase, prognosis and potential intervention targets of chronic diseases in mid- and late-life. The study focuses on several diseases, such as cardiovascular, neurological, ophthalmological, hepatic, endocrine, dermatological, otolaryngological, respiratory, locomotor and psychiatric diseases.

== History ==
Researchers of the department of Epidemiology & Biostatistics at the Erasmus Medical Center led by Professor Albert Hofman, conceptualized the study in the mid-1980s as response to increase in the proportion of elderly persons in the population who are also living with chronic diseases.

The study was established in 1990 in the Ommoord district of Rotterdam, The Netherlands. On March 26, 1991, Princess Juliana opened the ERGO research center at Briandplaats, Rotterdam.

== Cohorts ==
The Rotterdam Study consists of three cohorts.

The initial cohort (RS-I) started out in 1990 with 7,983 men and women aged 55 years and over. Follow-up visits were held in 1993–1995, in 1997–1999, 2002–2004, 2009–2011, and 2014-2015.

In 2000 a second cohort was established (RS-II). Another 3,011 inhabitants of Ommoord aged 55 years and over agreed to participate. The participants of this second cohort visited the research center for a follow-up examinations in 2004-2005, 2011–2012, and 2015-2016.

The third cohort of the Rotterdam Study (RS-III) started in 2006, this time with inhabitants aged 45 years and over. Inclusion ended in December 2008 and 3,932 participants have been included in this third cohort. The first follow-up examinations were held in 2012-2014.

== Research center ==
A typical examination at the Rotterdam Study includes an extensive standardized home interview and two visits to the research center for clinical examinations. Risk factors are measured at the research center, which is located in the middle of the district of Ommoord.

== Clinical follow-up ==
Clinical outcomes are continuously monitored throughout the study period for all participants of the three cohorts. Data on morbidity and mortality are collected at general practitioners‘ practises and hospitals. Events are classified according to the ICD-10 system.

== Publications ==
The results of the Rotterdam Study have been published in more than 1700 research articles and reports. A list of publications from the Rotterdam Study.
