= Laura Beane Freeman =

American epidemiologist

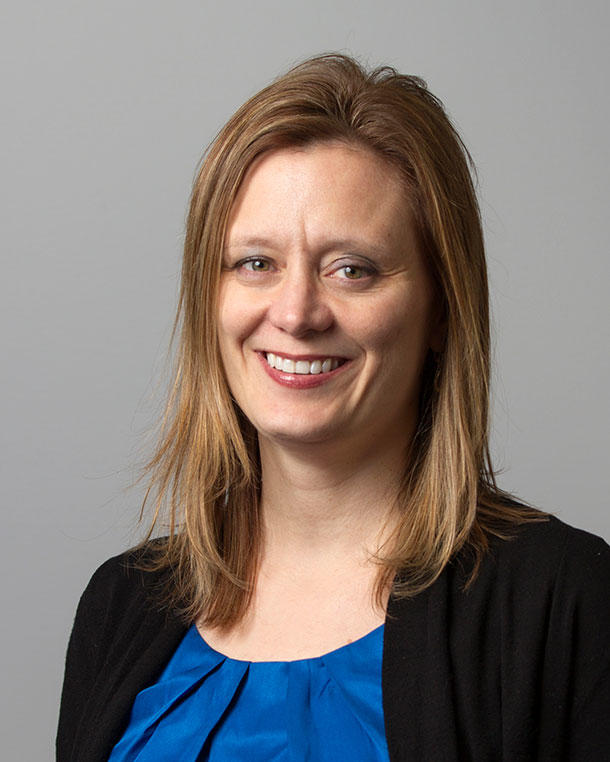
- Education: University of Iowa
- Scientific career
- Fields: Environmental epidemiology
- Workplaces: National Cancer Institute

Laura Elizabeth Beane Freeman is an American environmental epidemiologist who is a senior investigator in the occupational and environmental epidemiology branch at the National Cancer Institute.

== Life ==
Beane Freeman completed a M.S. (1999) and Ph.D. (2003) in epidemiology from the University of Iowa. Her dissertation was titled Arsenic exposure, artificial tanning and melanoma in Iowa. Leslie K. Dennis was her doctoral advisor.

Beane Freeman completed postdoctoral training in the National Cancer Institute (NCI) Occupational and Environmental Epidemiology Branch (OEEB). In 2009, she was appointed to the tenure track and was awarded scientific tenure by the NIH in 2017. She is the NCI Principal Investigator of the Agricultural Health Study, the Early Life Exposures in Agriculture Study, and the NCI Formaldehyde Industries cohort. Beane Freeman has received awards recognizing her work, including two NCI Director’s Innovation Awards, and the NCI Division of Cancer Epidemiology and Genetics (DCEG) Mentoring Award. In 2016, Beane Freeman was elected to the Management Group of the International Epidemiology in Occupational Health (EPICOH) society. She was elected Women Scientist Advisor for DCEG in 2020 and re-elected in 2022 to a three-year term. In 2021, she was elected to a three-year term as chair of Epidemiology in Occupational Health Conference (EPICOH).
