= HIV disease–related drug reaction =

Adverse reaction to HIV/AIDS treatment

HIV disease–related drug reaction is an adverse drug reaction caused by drugs used for the treatment of HIV/AIDS.

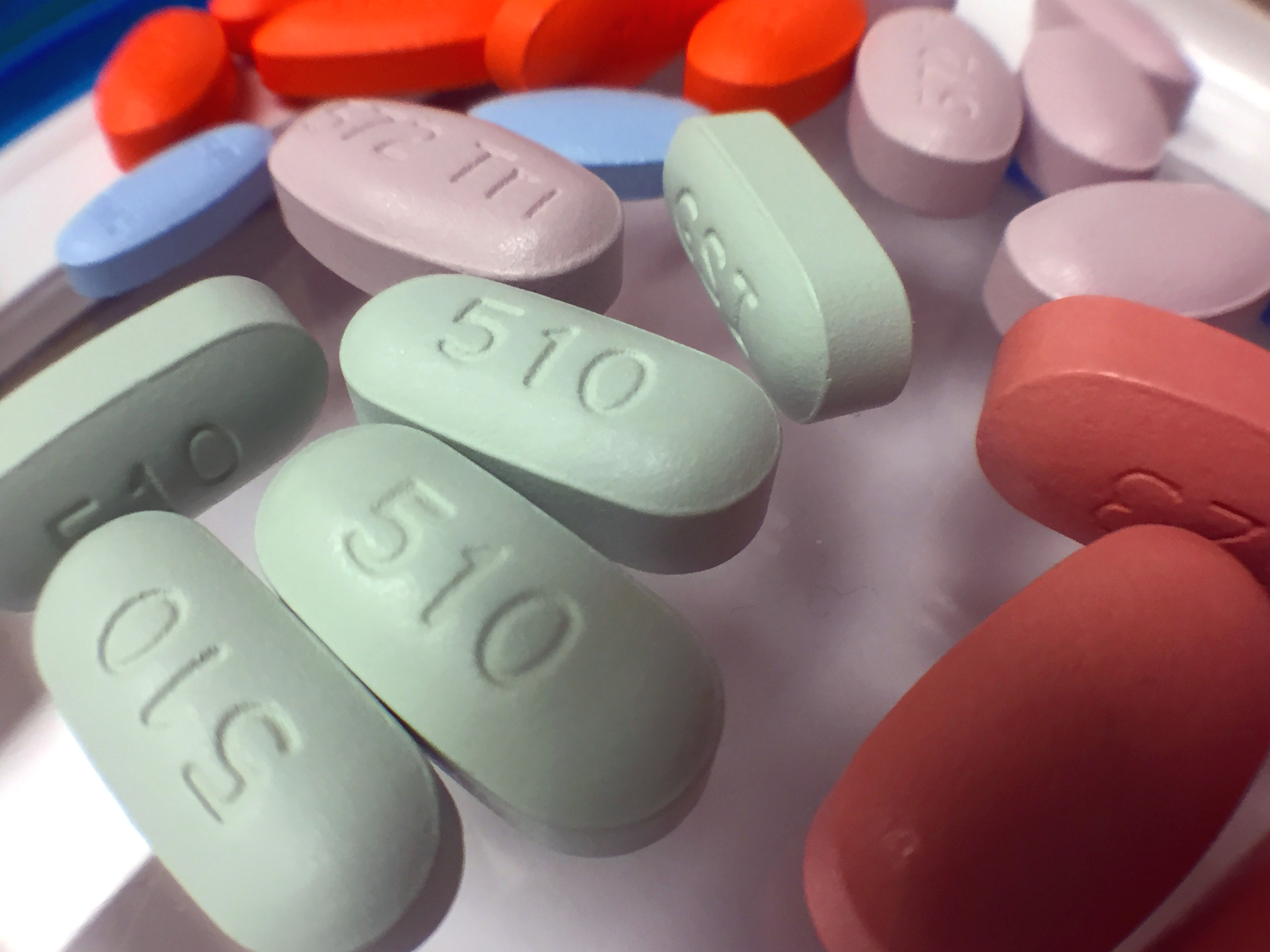
Image of common antiretroviral drugs to treat HIV infection

Drug reactions are a major cause of mortality and morbidity around the world. Special populations of people, such as those who are HIV-positive, can be up to a hundred times more susceptible to immune-mediated adverse drug reactions than the general public.

== Types of Reaction and offending medication ==
=== Immune-mediated drug hypersensitivity ===
Commonly prescribed medications for HIV, such as sulfonamides, anticonvulsants, antibacterials, antifungals, antimycobacterials, and, most notably, antiretrovirals, have an increased incidence of adverse cutaneous drug reactions in HIV-positive individuals, and even greater escalation of incidence in people with advanced disease progression in the form of AIDS. The specific mechanism for how HIV infection increases risk of drug reactions in HIV-positive individuals is unclear. Many factors contribute to this increased risk of adverse drug reactions found among people with HIV. Some explanations involve poly-pharmacy, slow acetylator status, glutathione deficiency, etc. In addition, it is also thought to be caused by immune hyperactivation, altered immunoregulatory pathways, reactivation of comorbid herpes viral infections, altered redox balance, uncontrolled immune activation, and loss of CD4+ T-helper cells. There is no single defined cause for this association.

Some prescription medications are more likely to cause these adverse drug reactions than others. Non-nucleoside reverse transcriptase inhibitors have been shown to have the highest rate of causing immune-related drug reactions in people who are HIV positive. Trimethoprim-sulfamethoxazole, also known by the brands Bactrim or Septra have caused adverse cutaneous drug reactions at an incidence of 2.6%-8% in the general population, but 43%-69% in patients with HIV infection or AIDS. A retrospective study of adult patients with Pneumocystis jirovecii pneumonia and AIDS who were admitted to Veterans General Hospital in Taiwan between January 2006 to December 2011 and treated with trimethoprim-sulfamethoxazole demonstrated a high incidence of adverse drug reactions that mostly involved the skin and liver. Significant risk factors were daily dose of greater than 16 mg/kg of trimethoprim-sulfamethoxazole and an age of 34 or older.

=== Drug-induced liver injury ===
The use of antiretroviral therapies have decreased the risk of early mortality and improved the quality of life for people who are HIV-positive. A significant increase in the use of these medications have been seen over the years, from an estimated 7.7 million people receiving these antiretrovirals therapies in 2010, to approximately 24.5 million estimated people worldwide in 2018. Despite the success in efforts to treat and control the disease with these medications, there are reports of people who received treatment and developed a severe adverse drug reaction such as a drug-induced liver injury (DILI). Antiretrovirals including non-nucleoside reverse transcriptase inhibitors (NNRTIs) and transcriptase inhibitors (NRTIs) have been reported to cause DILI in people with HIV. Genetic variations in drug metabolizing enzymes are associated with a higher risk of adverse drug reactions in people with HIV taking antiretrovirals, and it may become recommended under the practice of precision medicine to screen for genetic susceptibility to adverse effects based on these enzymes. The reported incidence of antiretroviral therapy induced liver injury range from 8%-23% in people with HIV. Among these people, 30% had needed to have a change in the medication plan or even discontinue their current therapy.

Drug-induced liver injury is a common cause of prolonged hospital stays for people with HIV, and in more severe reactions can be life-threatening. Antiretrovirals may also cause damage to cells in a person with HIV, decreasing function of crucial cells and releasing toxins in the body. Thus, discontinuing the offending medication may cause loss of control in viral load and ultimately treatment failure. Studies have reported that efavirenz is a potential agent that caused drug induced liver injury in HIV-positive patients taking the first line antiretroviral therapy of efavirenz/tenofovir disoproxil fumarate/emtricitabine fixed‐dose combination. Other reported risk factors for drug induced liver injury are female gender, young age, and high CD4+ count of >200 cells/mm3. All classes of antiretroviral medications could cause drug induced liver injury, but some classes of medications may be more toxic than others. Further research is needed to better understand and analyze any potential differences in risk levels between these classes of antiretrovirals.

Table of antiretroviral medications with a known adverse drug reaction in HIV-positive people.
Drug	Type of Reaction
Nevirapine	Drug induced liver injury, Hypersensitivity
Efavirenz	Drug induced liver injury, Hypersensitivity
Zidovudine	Drug induced liver injury
Stavudine	Drug induced liver injury
Didanosine	Drug induced liver injury
Abacavir	Hypersensitivity
Indinavir	Drug induced liver injury
Tipranivir	Drug induced liver injury
Aplaviran	Drug induced liver injury

== Diagnosis ==
Diagnosis of HIV drug caused drug induced liver injury (DILI):

The most important way to figure out whether the ART drug causes the drug DILI is to do the blood test to see the AST and ALT level. If the AST and ALT level increase, the HIV drugs are causing the hepatotoxicity. In addition to the high level of AST and ALT level, the bilirubin and gamma-glutamiltranspeptidase (GGT) may also increase when doing the ART HIV treatment. Normally, the hepatic toxicity may be suspected if the bilirubin and GGT levels are higher than the normal level. However, some studies has shown that the ART drug may inhibit the UDP-glucuronosyltransferase, which causes the indirect and total bilirubin to increase. Moreover, the increase of GGT may be the indication of cholelithiasis and the cholelithiasis could be further worse to damage the hepatocyte. However, increasing the GGT may have variable reasons and the mechanism of how ART causes high GGT is still unknown, but the gold standard to determine if the cholelithiasis occurs is the alkaline phosphatase.

Diagnosis of zidovudine related anemia: zidovudine counters HIV in two ways. It can directly inhibit reverse transcriptase from converting viral RNA to DNA so that HIV cannot integrate into human DNA. In addition, zidovudine works as a DNA replication chain terminator. Because of its DNA chain terminator feature, the bone marrow may be suppressed so that its production of red blood cells is decreased. Moreover, zidovudine may also increase the destruction of red blood cells, which may continue to decrease the red blood cell count.

1. Complete blood count (CBC)
2. Blood smear

Blood smears in cases zidovudine-related anemia usually show a megaloblastic macrocytic anemia associated with the vitamin B12 and folic acid deficiency and the mechanism of how these occur is still unknown.

Diagnosis of nucleoside reverse transcriptase inhibitor (NRTI) related lactic acidosis: The NRTI can increase lactate production by disrupting the normal mitochondrial metabolic pathway and the NAD+/NADH cycle. These impair the lipid beta-oxidation and oxidative phosphorylation, and long chain fatty acids are unable to be broken down so that the preferred metabolic pathway for oxidation is changed to glycolysis. Glycolysis produces excessive lactic acid, leading to the lactic acidosis.

Test results that indicate lactic acidosis, are:

1. Blood pH < 7.35
2. lactate level > 45–54mg/dL
3. Increased anion gap

There are two types of lactic acidosis most commonly seen are termed type A and type B lactic acidosis. Type A lactic acidosis is mainly caused by the systemic ischemia since the oxygen has trouble being delivered to tissues and that the biochemical metabolic pathway is shifted to glycolysis to generate ATP. Therefore, this shifting increases the lactic acid level and leads to lactic acidosis. Type B lactic acidosis is most likely caused by the exogenous toxins, such as the NRTI itself. Since the treatment of the lactic acidosis is to mainly treat the underlying causes, it is important to differentiate the type A and type B lactic acidosis. Since the type A lactic acidosis is most likely caused by the ischemia, we can use the additional imaging and blood test to screen the ischemia condition. If no ischemia is found out, the type A lactic acidosis can be eliminated.

== Prevention ==
=== Precision medicine ===
There are multiple preventative measures that have been shown to decrease the incidences of immune medicated adverse drug reactions. Abacavir is an HIV medication that can cause adverse reactions like hives and fevers. Additionally, it is contraindicated for re-challenging, thus making it important for people seeking to start Abacavir to proceed with caution. With the advancement of precision medicine, the HLA-B57:01 genetic testing has been shown to decrease the incidence of adverse drug reactions. However cost and accessibility of genetic testing are often a barrier to the populations that benefit from precision medicine the most.

=== Desensitization ===
While some HIV medications are contraindicated for re-challenging, desensitization is a viable option when starting a new medication. Desensitization, slowly increasing the strength or dose of medication, has proven to reduce adverse drug reactions. For example, people living with HIV have a higher likelihood of developing an adverse drug reaction to cotrimoxazole. However, desensitization methods have been shown to have a lower rate of hypersensitivity when compared to trying to re-challenge cotrimoxazole.

Another example of desensitization is the treatment for a 41 year-old female who had been infected with HIV for 18 years. She had gone through multiple antiretroviral therapy treatments. She had developed a cutaneous adverse reaction from other generations of nucleoside reverse transcriptase inhibitors (NRTIs). Darunavir/r was chosen for their first therapy with drug resistance and susceptibility in mind. After eight days of treatment, they were forced to halt all medication therapy as they had developed a severe pruritic cutaneous adverse reaction to darunavir/r. The thought of re-challenging was turned down due to the severity of her adverse reaction. However, with limited options, a desensitization protocol for darunavir/r was initiated. She was dosed every 30 minutes starting at 25mcg and ending at 300mcg on the first day of treatment. The treatment was completed with no problem other than generalized pruritus without rash which was contained with the use of antihistamines for a week. After the antihistamine treatment, there were no future signs of adverse reactions through continuing therapy. Unlike precision medicine, there a greater number of medications that have existing desensitization protocols proven to help decrease the incidence of adverse drug reactions in people with HIV.

== Treatment ==
When considering the treatment of an adverse drug reaction, there needs to be an analysis of weighing the risks versus benefits. Many people living with HIV have co-morbid conditions that may lead to increasing the need for therapy. Introducing new medications to people living with HIV may increase the burden of poly-pharmacy. The majority of cutaneous adverse reactions are benign, thus treatment is often not required. However, monitoring is still required to prevent complications that may arise from the worsening of adverse drug reactions.

== Vulnerable populations ==
Aging leads to changes in the body's physiologic functions. Elderly people (over 65 years of age) have decreased liver function and decreased renal clearance of drugs compared to their younger counterparts. Due to these physiologic changes, pharmacokinetics and pharmacodynamics can be impacted, leading to and increased or decreased drug effect and an increased risk of experiencing adverse drug reactions. It is important to consider these physiologic changes when prescribing or administering medications to treat HIV in HIV-positive individuals above 65 years of age. Older age, smoking, and longer duration of HIV infection are associated with increased risk of developing multiple conditions in addition to HIV, such as hypertension, dyslipidemia, diabetes mellitus, kidney disease, cardiovascular disease, respiratory disorders, bone disorders or cancer.
