= Sharon Fonn =

South African researcher (born 1968)

- Born: 1958 (age 67–68)
- Education: MB ChB, PhD University of the Witwatersrand
- Scientific career
- Fields: Public Health
- Workplaces: University of the Witwatersrand
- Website: www.wits.ac.za/staff/academic-a-z-listing/f/sharonfonnwitsacza/

Sharon Fonn is a South African Professor of Public Health at the University of the Witwatersrand. Her work has focused on cervical cancer, health systems and developing African capacity for public health research.

== Career and impact ==
Fonn served as the head of the University of the Witwatersrand School of Public Health from 2003 to 2011. She is a member of the Academy of Science of South Africa. Professor Fonn helped to set up Africa's longest running study of children from birth She has published over 50 scientific articles.

== Awards and honors ==
- honorary doctorate at Sahlgrenska Academy
