= Occupational epidemiology =

Epidemiology of workplaces diseases

Occupational epidemiology is a subdiscipline of epidemiology that focuses on investigations of workers and the workplace. Occupational epidemiologic studies examine health outcomes among workers, and their potential association with conditions in the workplace including noise, chemicals, heat, or radiation, or work organization such as schedules.

The need for evidence to inform occupational safety regulations, workers' compensation programs, and safety legislation motivated the development of public health policy, occupational epidemiology methods, and surveillance mechanisms. Occupational epidemiological research can inform risk assessments; development of standards and other risk management activities; and estimates of the co-benefits and co-harms of policies designed to reduce risk factors or conditions that can affect human health. Occupational epidemiology methods are common to methods used in environmental epidemiology.

== History ==
Occupational hazards have long been recognized. For Hippocrates recommended other physicians consider patients' vocational backgrounds when diagnosing and treating disease, and Bernardino Ramazzini in 1700 outlined many occupational diseases in his book De Morbis Artificum. There are several examples from the 19th century onwards of hazard recognition proceeding to systematic epidemiology studies. In one example, premature mortality was reported among gold and silver miners in the Erz Mountains in Germany as early as the 16th century. It was initially thought to be the result of consumption, but it was subsequently determined to be silicosis, and studies from 1879 through the 1930s uncovered the association of miners' deaths with lung cancer and nonmalignant respiratory diseases. Other examples include cancer among chimney sweeps, asbestos-related diseases, and the variety of occupational diseases found among factory workers in the early 1900s.

Occupational health risks were initially observed by case series reports of apparent disease excesses or clusters. Although the case series approach provided a good indicator of occupational hazards, they are not adequate on their own to assess a wide spectrum of health outcomes that may not be closely related to workplace exposure. The development of retrospective, cohort design allowed for a more comprehensive study of the cases. Desire to improve the cost-efficiency of studies led to the use of case-control studies. Other methods later used in occupational epidemiology include cross-sectional and longitudinal studies.

== Early disease of concern recognized in the workplace ==
=== Coal Workers' Pneumoconiosis ===
The classic and preventable lung disorder of the mining industry, pneumoconiosis is commonly known as “black lung disease” and due to long term exposure to coal dust. This condition has been identified since 1775 and has been officially listed as an occupational disease since 1980 by the ILO List of Occupational Diseases.

Coal Workers Pneumoconiosis (CWP) develops when coal dust accumulates over time in the respiratory system and creates dark spots of trapped coal dust particles called coal macules. CWP typically takes at least 10 years to develop after initial exposure and as the scarring continues to worsen, oxygen may be prevented from reaching the blood which subsequently puts stress on other organs, such as the heart and brain.

The CDC and NIOSH examined and assessed trends in premature mortality attributed to CWP from 1999 to 2016, which are the most recent years for which complete data is available and calculated years of potential life lost to life expectancy (YPLL). From 1999 to 2016, people aged 25 and older with CWP lost more years of life relative to their life expectancy than expected. This suggests that there has been increased CWP severity and rapid disease progression and highlights the importance of strengthening prevention measures to prevent premature CWP-associated mortality.

The Coal Workers’ Health Surveillance Program (CWHSP) was established by the Federal Coal Mine Health and Safety Act of 1969. The mission of this program is to detect lung disease early in coal miners to subsequently prevent progression to severe lung disease. CWHSP provides U.S. coal miners with black lung screening opportunities at no cost to miners and are available when miners initially begin employment and at periodic intervals throughout their careers. The Mine Safety and Health Administration (MSHA) announced that they will give coal miners with black lung disease the right to work in areas with lower dust levels without reduced pay, discrimination, or termination. In 2014, MSHA landmark respirable dust rule went into effect with phase III in 2016, which decreased allowable exposure to respirable coal mine dust, which is the most effective means of preventing CWP caused by excessive exposure to such dust.

== Occupational exposures ==
The ability to identify, measure and model workplace exposures is a key step in the prevention of occupational illness. Occupational epidemiologists collaborate with industrial hygienists through field investigations that seek to identify and assess hazard exposures in the workplace. Depending on the type of work being done, many modes of exposure exist--droplet exposure through air, consumption, and injection are three occupational examples. The exposures experienced by a miner would differ from a nurse, but both fall under the jurisdiction of occupational epidemiology. Specific exposures associated with disease may be encountered in or near the workplace: compounds such as carbon monoxide leading to carbon monoxide poisioning and pesticide molecules leading to pesticide poisoning are two. After identifying such exposures, occupational epidemiologists use data analysis skills to create models illustrating a dose-response relationship. This leads to an understanding of how much, if any, exposure is safe. Data on both the amount of occupational disease and the level of exposure to a particular hazard will be collected and compared to discern whether there is a correlation.

== Types of studies ==
=== Case series ===
Typically occupational epidemiological investigations begin with the observation of an unusual number of cases of disease among a group of workers. When the investigation does not go further than what is referred to as identifying a disease cluster, the study is referred to as a case series report.

=== Cohort studies ===
In a cohort design study, a population, or cohort, of workers is compared to a control group that was not exposed to the workplace hazards being investigated. This type of study is the most accepted in the scientific community because it most closely follows experimental strategy and observes the entire population rather than a sample. In a prospective cohort study, the group examined at the time of the study is compared to a follow-up with the same group in the future. The historical cohort study design begins with defining a cohort at a time in the past and following the cohort over historical time.

==== Asbestos Exposure to Former Workers ====
Asbestos is a common industrial hygiene concern and is the name given to a group of naturally occurring minerals. What makes asbestos unique compared to other minerals is its resistance to fire and corrosion. Asbestos exposure can occur in many different industries, the most common being construction, manufacturing products like textiles, and automotive brake and clutch repair.

In June of 2024, a retrospective cohort study was conducted to identify the results of health surveillance in Italy after asbestos was banned in 1992. Health surveillance – the systematic collection, analysis, and interpretation of health-related data – conducted for exposed workers was voluntary and consisted of two phases: general evaluation with an assessment of work and residential history followed by a physical examination with emphasis on the respiratory system. This study consisted of 4 birth cohorts and examined the results of several physical tests including spirometry, CAT scan, etc. Results identified decreased levels of lung function, damage to the lungs, and lung cancer associated with 3 decades of asbestos exposure in the workplace.

=== Case-control studies ===
Case-control studies compare the past exposure of cases with the disease to the past exposure of cases that did not have the disease. Because cohort studies require the entire population, case-control studies are a more cost-effective approach, using only the sample of workers with the disease to compare to a control.

==== Hyperuricemia in Steelworkers ====
Hyperuricemia is a condition in which there are elevated levels of uric acid in the body. Uric acid is created as a waste product when the body breaks down chemicals known as purines in food and drinks. Hyperuricemia can lead to other health conditions including but not limited to gouty arthritis, renal impairment, and coronary artery disease.

A case-control study conducted by Chinese scientists in 2022 wanted to identify the relationship between occupational exposure in Ironworkers and hyperuricemia. Samples of heat, dust, and noise were taken and individuals included in the study were grouped based on sex, smoking status (non-smokers and former smokers), alcohol consumption, and physical activity at the workplace. Physical and laboratory examinations including blood samples were used to measure uric acid levels in individuals. Results from the study found that the incidence rate of hyperuricemia in Steelworkers was 17.3% and is higher in comparison to the average worker in China.

=== Cross-sectional studies ===
A typical cross-sectional study involves the comparison of varying degrees of exposure and the prevalence of disease, symptoms, or physiological status. The main advantage of cross-sectional studies is that they allow collection of data on conditions which would not be recorded normally because other study designs focus on severe states of disease. This is also the biggest shortcoming of this study type because by using prevalence rather than incidence it cannot be used to make a causal inference.

== Application ==
By contributing to reduction in exposure, occupational epidemiology helps reduce health risks among workers. Using occupational epidemiological methods can also have benefits for society at large. For example, recommendations for exposure limits to benzene developed by the Expert Panel on Air Quality Standards were based on occupational epidemiology.

Using meta-analysis, many occupational epidemiology studies can be synthesized in order to help set occupational exposure limits and make other kinds of policy decisions. This can also be applied in health risk assessments, which is a method of predicting health risk based on hypothetical exposure conditions.

== See also ==
- Alice Hamilton
- Occupational Hygiene
- Occupational safety and health
- Epidemiology
- Health surveillance
