= Retrospective cohort study =

Historic cohort study

Case–control study versus cohort on a timeline. "OR" stands for "odds ratio" and "RR" stands for "relative risk".

A retrospective cohort study, also called a historic cohort study, is a longitudinal cohort study used in medical and psychological research. A cohort of individuals that share a common exposure factor is compared with another group of equivalent individuals not exposed to that factor, to determine the factor's influence on the incidence of a condition such as disease or death. Retrospective cohort studies have existed for approximately as long as prospective cohort studies.

== Design ==
The retrospective cohort study compares groups of individuals who are alike in many ways but differ by a certain characteristic (for example, female nurses who smoke and ones who do not smoke) in terms of a particular outcome (such as lung cancer). Data on the relevant events for each individual (the form and time of exposure to a factor, the latent period, and the time of any subsequent occurrence of the outcome) are collected from existing records and can immediately be analyzed to determine the relative risk of the cohort compared to the control group.

This is fundamentally the same methodology as for a prospective cohort study, except that the retrospective study is performed post-hoc, looking back. The prospective study looks forward, enrolling patients unaffected by the outcome and observing them to see whether the outcome has occurred. However, both kinds of cohort studies share the same starting point (considering data from before the occurrence of the outcome). The first objective is still to establish two groups - exposed versus non-exposed - which are then assessed retrospectively to establish the most likely temporal sequence of events leading to the current disease state in both the exposed and unexposed groups.

Retrospective cohort studies require particular caution because errors due to confounding and bias are more common than in prospective studies.

== Advantages ==
Retrospective cohort studies exhibit the benefits of cohort studies and have distinct advantages relative to prospective ones:

- They are conducted on a smaller scale.
- They typically require less time to complete.
- They are generally less expensive, because resources are mainly devoted to collecting data.
- They are better for analyzing multiple outcomes.
- In a medical context, they can potentially address rare diseases, which would necessitate extremely large cohorts in prospective studies.

Retrospective studies are especially helpful in addressing diseases of low incidence, since affected people have already been identified so . The fact that retrospective studies are generally less expensive than prospective studies may be another key benefit. Additionally, it has essentially all the benefits of a cohort study.

== Disadvantages ==
Retrospective studies have disadvantages vis-a-vis prospective studies:

- Some key statistics cannot be measured, and significant biases may affect the selection of controls.
- Researchers cannot control exposure or outcome assessment, and instead must rely on others for accurate recordkeeping. When relying on individual recall of former exposure to risk variables, recall may be inaccurate and subject to biases. It can be very difficult to make accurate comparisons between the exposed and the non-exposed.
- The retrospective aspect may introduce selection bias and mis-classification or information bias. With retrospective studies, the temporal relationship is frequently difficult to assess.
- Retrospective studies may need very large sample sizes for rare outcomes.

== Comparison with case-control studies ==
While retrospective cohort studies try to compare the risk of developing a disease to some already known exposure factors, a case-control study will try to determine the possible exposure factors after a known disease incidence. Both the relative risk and odds ratio are relevant in retrospective cohort studies, but only the odds ratio can be used in case-control studies. Although most case-control studies are retrospective, they can also be prospective when the researcher still enrolls participants based on the occurrence of a disease as new cases occur.

== See also ==
- Case-control study
