= Recall bias =

Type of cognitive bias

In epidemiological research, recall bias is a systematic error caused by differences in the accuracy or completeness of the recollections retrieved ("recalled") by study participants regarding events or experiences from the past. It is sometimes also referred to as response bias, responder bias or reporting bias.

== Explanation ==
Recall bias is a type of measurement bias, and can be a methodological issue in research involving interviews or questionnaires. In this case, it could lead to misclassification of various types of exposure. Recall bias is of particular concern in retrospective studies that use a case-control design to investigate the etiology of a disease or psychiatric condition. For example, in studies of risk factors for breast cancer, women who have had the disease may search their memories more thoroughly than members of the unaffected control group for possible causes of their cancer. Those in the case group (those with breast cancer) may be able to recall a greater number of potential risk factors they had been exposed to than those in the control group (women unaffected by breast cancer). This can potentially exaggerate the relation between a potential risk factor and the disease.

== Prevention ==
To minimize recall bias, some clinical trials have adopted a "wash out period", i.e., a substantial time period that must elapse between the subject's first observation and their subsequent observation of the same event. Use of hospital records rather than patient experience can also help to avoid recall bias. Standardising sampling methods can help to avoid needing recall information in the first place.

Often, recall bias is difficult to avoid, and many studies change experiment design to avoid recalling information.
