= Cohort (statistics) =

Group of subjects sharing a characteristic

Case–control study versus cohort on a timeline. "OR" stands for "odds ratio" and "RR" stands for "relative risk".

In statistics, epidemiology, marketing and demography, a cohort is a group of subjects who share a defining characteristic (typically subjects who experienced a common event in a selected time period, such as birth or graduation). It is often used synonymously with social generation in demographics, marketing, and social science, where it means "people within a delineated population who experience the same significant events within a given period of time."

== Comparison with period data ==
Cohort data can oftentimes be more advantageous to demographers than period data. Because cohort data is honed to a specific time period, it is usually more accurate. It is more accurate because it can be tuned to retrieve custom data for a specific study.

In addition, cohort data is not affected by tempo effects, unlike period data. However, cohort data can be disadvantageous in the sense that it can take a long amount of time to collect the data necessary for the cohort study. Another disadvantage of cohort studies is that it can be extremely costly to carry out, since the study will go on for a long period of time, demographers often require sufficient funds to fuel the study.

Demography often contrasts cohort perspectives and period perspectives. For instance, the total cohort fertility rate is an index of the average completed family size for cohorts of women, but since it can only be known for women who have finished child-bearing, it cannot be measured for currently fertile women. It can be calculated as the sum of the cohort's age-specific fertility rates that obtain as it ages through time. In contrast, the total period fertility rate uses current age-specific fertility rates to calculate the completed family size for a notional woman, were she to experience these fertility rates through her life.

== Cohort studies ==
Two important types of cohort studies are:

1. Prospective Cohort Study: In this type of study, there is a collection of exposure data (baseline data) from the subjects recruited before development of the outcomes of interest. The subjects are then followed through time (future) to record when the subject develops the outcome of interest. Ways to follow-up with subjects of the study include: phone interviews, face-to-face interviews, physical exams, medical/laboratory tests, and mail questionnaires. An example of a prospective cohort study is, for instance, if a demographer wanted to measure all the males born in the year 2018. The demographer would have to wait for the event to be over, the year 2018 must come to an end in order for the demographer to have all the necessary data.
2. Retrospective Cohort Study: Retrospective Studies start with subjects that are at risk to have the outcome or disease of interest and identifies the outcome starting from where the subject is when the study starts to the past of the subject to identify the exposure. Retrospective use records: clinical, educational, birth certificates, death certificates, etc. but that may be difficult because there may not be data for the study that is being initiated. These studies may have multiple exposures which may make this study difficult. On the other hand, an example of a retrospective cohort study is, if a demographer was examining a group of people born in year 1970 who have type 1 diabetes. The demographer would begin by looking at historical data. However, if the demographer was looking at ineffective data in attempts to deduce the source of type 1 diabetes, the demographers results would not be accurate.

== See also ==
- Age grade
- Bureau of Labor Statistics
- Case mix
- Cohort study
- Social generation
- National Longitudinal Surveys
- Prospective cohort study
