= Prospective cohort study =

Longitudinal cohort study

Case–control study versus cohort on a timeline. "OR" stands for "odds ratio" and "RR" stands for "relative risk".

A prospective cohort study is a longitudinal cohort study that follows over time a group of similar individuals (cohorts) who differ with respect to certain factors under study to determine how these factors affect rates of a certain outcome. For example, one might follow a cohort of middle-aged truck drivers who vary in terms of smoking habits to test the hypothesis that the 20-year incidence rate of lung cancer will be highest among heavy smokers, followed by moderate smokers, and then non–smokers.

The prospective study is important for research on the etiology of diseases and disorders. The distinguishing feature of a prospective cohort study is that at the time the investigators begin enrolling subjects and collecting baseline exposure information, none of the subjects have developed any of the outcomes of interest. After baseline information is collected, subjects in a prospective cohort study are then followed "longitudinally," i.e., over a period of time, usually for years, to determine if and when they become diseased and whether their exposure status changes outcomes. In this way, investigators can eventually use the data to answer many questions about the associations between "risk factors" and disease outcomes. For example, one could identify smokers and non-smokers at baseline and compare their subsequent incidence of developing heart disease. Alternatively, one could group subjects based on their body mass index (BMI) and compare their risk of developing heart disease or cancer. Prospective cohort studies are typically ranked higher in the hierarchy of evidence than retrospective cohort studies and can be more expensive than a case–control study.

One of the advantages of prospective cohort studies is that they can help determine risk factors for being infected with a new disease because they are a longitudinal observation over time, and the collection of results is at regular time intervals, so recall error is minimized.

== Reporting ==
The Strengthening the Reporting of Observational studies in Epidemiology (STROBE) recommends that authors refrain from calling a study ‘prospective’ or ‘retrospective’ due to these terms having contradictory and overlapping definitions. STROBE also recommends that whenever authors use these words, they specify which definition they use, including a detailed description of how and when data collection took place.

== Examples ==
- Caerphilly Heart Disease Study, UK.
- Canadian Longitudinal Study on Aging / Étude longitudinale canadienne sur le vieillissement (CLSA-ÉLCV)
- The CARTaGENE cohort / Quebec's largest prospective study , Quebec, Canada
- Cebu Longitudinal Health and Nutrition Survey, the Philippines
- Framingham Heart Study, USA.
- LifE Study, Germany.
- Million Women Study, UK.
- Rotterdam Study, Netherlands.
- Tsimane’ Amazonian Panel Study, Bolivia
- The UK biobank , UK

== See also ==
- Retrospective cohort study
- Blinded experiment
- Clinical trial
- Therapeutic effect
- Randomization
