= Job-exposure matrix =

A job-exposure matrix (JEM) is a tool used to assess exposure to potential health hazards in occupational epidemiological studies.

Essentially, a JEM comprises a list of levels of exposure to a variety of harmful (or potentially harmful) agents for selected occupational titles. In large population-based epidemiological studies, JEMs may be used as a quick and systematic means of converting coded occupational data (job titles) into a matrix of possible exposures, eliminating the need to assess each individual's exposure in detail.

== Advantages ==
Assessing exposure by title is less costly than looking at individual cases. JEMs may also reduce differential information bias that might occur when evaluating exposure for individuals from medical records in which their jobs are apparent.

== Disadvantages ==
Variability of exposure within occupational classes in different workplaces, countries, or throughout time is commonly not taken into account, which can result in nondifferential exposure misclassification.
