= Birth to Twenty =

Study of child and adolescent health and development

Birth to Twenty (BT20) is Africa's largest and longest running study of child and adolescent health and development. The study is a birth cohort study, and in 1990 began to track the development of 3,273 newborn infants. According to supporter, University of Witwatersrand, Johannesburg, BT20 is colloquially nicknamed "Mandela's Children" as the program began following Nelson Mandela's release from prison. As the name suggests, the study plans will continue to monitor its subjects until they are twenty years old (2010). As of 2008, the study was still active.

The first round of the study began in 1989/1990, and questioned the still-pregnant mothers about general demographic characteristics, and the conditions of the pregnancy. After further rounds of assessments and surveys at birth and six months, data was obtained on an annual basis. The question in the yearly surveys cover a broad range of topics, touching on both the physical health and development of the child, his or her environment, education, nutrition, socioeconomic class, and cognitive development. Later surveys also monitor each subject's opinion on politics, Africa, and other social opinions.

The study is unique source of information for major policy decisions in the South Africa, especially due to the absence of other data. Information on children's recognition of cigarette brands, for example, was used by the Minister of Health from 1997 to 1999 to push forward progressive tobacco legislation, preventing public advertising and the sale of cigarettes to minors. The early age of school entry revealed by longitudinal data was used by the Ministry of Education in 2004 to legislate a minimum age for school enrolment.

As a longitudinal study, one of the major criteria by which one may judge the Birth to Twenty study is by the number of subjects for whom data is obtained in each round, or the attrition rate. One of the difficulties encountered by the Birth to Twenty is that many subjects move out of the area, and can no longer participate. Nevertheless, the study has quite consistently obtained data from between 50% - 65% of the original cohort of 3,273. In 2005-2006, for example, data was collected from 2,100 subjects, or 64%.

== Availability of Data ==
The data for the Birth to 20 study is not publicly available. According to the "Memorandum of Understanding," interested researches should contact the projects Executive Committee if they wish to obtain the study's data or publish a paper based on it.

== Funding ==
Since its inception, Birth to Twenty has been funded by the South African Medical Research Council. Other sources of funding include the Institute for Behavioural Sciences at the University of South Africa. Since 1998, the Wellcome Trust has been a major contributor, with additional support coming from the Human Sciences Research Council of South Africa, the Medical Research Council, the University of the Witwatersrand, the Mellon Foundation, the South-African Netherlands Programme on Alternative Development and the Anglo American Chairman's Fund.
