= Tony McMichael =

Australian epidemiologist (1942–2014)

Anthony John McMichael AO FTSE (3 October 1942 – 26 September 2014) was an Australian epidemiologist who retired from the Australian National University in 2012.

== Background ==
McMichael grew up in Adelaide, and graduated in medicine from the University of Adelaide (1961–1967). As a student, he spent a summer volunteering at a leprosy colony in New Delhi, India where he saw how patients were treated as social outcasts suffering from the stigma of a disfiguring disease although they were no longer contagious. The following year, whilst on a similar service trip to Papua New Guinea he met social sciences student Judith Healy, whom he married shortly after graduation. They had 2 children. He was elected president of the National Union of Students, based in Melbourne, in 1968.

After 18 months in general practice, he was invited to become the PhD student of Professor Basil Hetzel at the new department of social and preventive medicine, Monash University in Victoria, graduating in 1972. Studying factors that influenced the mental health of undergraduate students, he gained skills in epidemiological research. He also showed early evidence of independent inquiry informed by reading the works of thinkers such as Paul R. Ehrlich and Anne H. Ehrlich who questioned the capacity of the Earth to support a growing world population with increasing consumption of resources.

He then worked at the School of Public Health at the University of North Carolina, Chapel Hill, studying the health of workers in the tyre industry. Returning to Australia he worked for CSIRO and then became the Foundation Chair in Occupational and Environmental Health at the University of Adelaide from 1986 until 1994. From 1994 to 2001, he was the Professor of Epidemiology at the London School of Hygiene & Tropical Medicine, before returning to Australia to follow Prof Bob Douglas as the director of the National Centre for Epidemiology and Population Health at the Australian National University in Canberra. Most recently he held an NHMRC Australia Fellowship at the ANU, where he also ran the Environment, Climate, and Health research program. McMichael was chair of think tank The Australia Institute.

== Scholarly contributions ==
McMichael coined the term the 'Healthy Worker Effect' (later extended by others to similar phenomena such as the 'Healthy Migrant effect'), a statistical fiction that tended to overestimate the good health of populations working in noxious industries. His study established a link between benzene exposure and leukemia among tyre builders.

While working in South Australia, he uncovered a link between lead pollution and impaired childhood neurocognitive development around an industrial plant in Port Pirie. His work, and two other studies, were instrumental in the phasing out of lead in more than 100 countries. Increasingly interested in underlying causes of illness, he exposed the effects of passive smoking, and also the effects of UV radiation in creating lower rates of multiple sclerosis, which has a higher incidence in populations towards the poles. UV exposure lessens immune system activity, including misdirected "autoimmune" attacks on the body tissues.

In later years, and particularly after returning to Australia in 2001, he worked on the health effects of climate change. He had always been influenced by ideas of anthropogenic crises, first population growth, and latterly of general planetary overload. He argued that a warming world would have significant negative effects on human health. He said "Climate change is not just about disruptions to the local economy or loss of jobs or loss of iconic species. It's actually about weakening the foundations of the life support systems that we depend on as a human species." His team showed that tens of thousands of people were dying each year from climate-induced flooding, malnutrition, and infectious diseases.

== Honours ==
- Officer of the Order of Australia, 2011
- Member, US National Academy of Sciences, 2011
- Shared the 2007 Nobel Peace Prize with Al Gore and world scientists
- Fellow of the Australian Academy of Technological Sciences and Engineering, 2003
- John Goldsmith Award, outstanding contributions to environmental epidemiology, ISEE, 2000
- Fellow, Australian Faculty of Public Health Medicine, 1996

== Publications ==
McMichael published over 300 peer-reviewed papers, 160 book chapters, and two sole-author books: "Planetary Overload: Global Environmental Change and Human Health" (1993), and "Human Frontiers, Environments and Disease: Past Patterns, Uncertain Futures" (2001). He has co-authored or edited several books.

In 2012, a Festschrift was held to commemorate his career. In 2015, the formal written festschrift was published.

His last book was published by Oxford University Press in 2017.
