= Environmental epidemiology =

Branch of epidemiology

Environmental epidemiology is a branch of epidemiology concerned with determining how environmental exposures impact human health. This field seeks to understand how various external risk factors may predispose to or protect against disease, illness, injury, developmental abnormalities, or death. These factors may be naturally occurring or may be introduced into environments where people live, work, and play.

== Scope ==
The World Health Organization European Centre for Environment and Health (WHO-ECEH) claims that 1.4 million deaths per year in Europe alone are due to avoidable environmental exposures. Environmental exposures can be broadly categorized into those that are proximate (e.g., directly leading to a health condition), including chemicals, physical agents, and microbiological pathogens, and those that are distal (e.g., indirectly leading to a health condition), such as socioeconomic conditions, climate change, and other broad-scale environmental changes. Proximate exposures occur through air, food, water, and skin contact. Distal exposures cause adverse health conditions directly by altering proximate exposures, and indirectly through changes in ecosystems and other support systems for human health.

Environmental epidemiology research can inform government policy change, risk management activities, and development of environmental standards. Vulnerability is the summation of all risk and protective factors that ultimately determine whether an individual or subpopulation experiences adverse health outcomes when an exposure to an environmental agent occurs. Sensitivity is an individual's or subpopulation's increased responsiveness, primarily for biological reasons, to that exposure. Biological sensitivity may be related to developmental stage, pre-existing medical conditions, acquired factors, and genetic factors. Socioeconomic factors also play a critical role in altering vulnerability and sensitivity to environmentally mediated factors by increasing the likelihood of exposure to harmful agents, interacting with biological factors that mediate risk, and/or leading to differences in the ability to prepare for or cope with exposures or early phases of illness. Populations living in certain regions may be at increased risk due to location and the environmental characteristics of a region.

== History ==
Acknowledgement that the environment impacts human health can be found as far back as 460 B.C. in Hippocrates' essay On Airs, Waters, and Places. In it, he urges physicians to contemplate how factors such as drinking water can impact the health of their patients. Another famous example of environment-health interaction is the lead poisoning experienced by the ancient Romans, who used lead in their water pipes and kitchen pottery. Vitruvius, a Roman architect, wrote to discourage the use of lead pipes, citing health concerns:

"Water conducted through earthen pipes is more wholesome than that through lead; indeed that conveyed in lead must be injurious, because from it white lead is obtained, and this is said to be injurious to the human system. Hence, if what is generated from it is pernicious, there can be no doubt that itself cannot be a wholesome body. This may be verified by observing the workers in lead, who are of a pallid colour; for in casting lead, the fumes from it fixing on the different members, and daily burning them, destroy the vigour of the blood; water should therefore on no account be conducted in leaden pipes if we are desirous that it should be wholesome. That the flavour of that conveyed in earthen pipes is better, is shewn at our daily meals, for all those whose tables are furnished with silver vessels, nevertheless use those made of earth, from the purity of the flavour being preserved in them"

Generally considered to be one of the founders of modern epidemiology, John Snow conducted perhaps the first environmental epidemiology study in 1854. He showed that London residents who drank sewage-contaminated water were more likely to develop cholera than those who drank clean water.

=== U.S. government regulation ===
Throughout the 20th century, the United States Government passed legislation and regulations to address environmental health concerns. A partial list is below.

Table of Selected U.S. Laws Relating to Environmental Health
Law	Year	Brief Description
Federal Food, Drug, and Cosmetic Act	1938	Created the U.S. Food and Drug Administration (FDA)
Federal Insecticide, Fungicide, and Rodenticide Act	1947	Pesticide users and manufacturers must register with the EPA; pesticides must not cause unreasonable harm
Federal Water Pollution Control Act	1948 1977	Also known as the Clean Water Act, set water quality standards
Clean Air Act	1955, 1977	Created National Ambient Air Quality Standards (NAAQS) for environmental and public health protection
Solid Waste Disposal Act	1965	Specified standards for municipal and industrial waste disposal
Occupational Safety and Health Act	1970	Created worker protections standards and established the National Institute for Occupational Safety and Health (NIOSH)
Toxic Substances Control Act	1976	Allowed the EPA to regulate chemicals, including the ability to ban substances that are shown to harm humans
Comprehensive Environmental Response, Compensation, and Liability Act	1980 1986	Also known as Superfund, it taxes chemical and petroleum industries to fund clean-up of hazardous waste sites
Indoor Radon Abatement Act	1988	Funded radon clean-up and research programs
Food Quality Protection Act	1996	Amended the Federal Insecticide, Fungicide, and Rodenticide Act to include a requirement that pesticides have reasonable certainty that they do not cause human harm

=== Precautionary principle ===
The precautionary principle is a concept in the environmental sciences that if an activity is suspected to cause harm, we should not wait until sufficient evidence of that harm is collected to take action. It has its roots in German environmental policy, and was adopted in 1990 by the participants of the North-Sea Conferences in The Hague by declaration. In 2000, the European Union began to formally adopt the precautionary principle into its laws as a Communication from the European Commission. The United States has resisted adoption of this principle, citing concerns that unfounded science could lead to obligations for expensive control measures, especially as related to greenhouse gas emissions.

== Investigations ==
=== Observational studies ===
Environmental epidemiology studies are most frequently observational in nature, meaning researchers look at people's exposures to environmental factors without intervening and then observe the patterns that emerge. This is because it is often unethical or unfeasible to conduct an experimental study of environmental factors in humans. For example, a researcher cannot ask some of their study subjects to smoke cigarettes to see if they have poorer health outcomes than subjects who are asked not to smoke. The study types most often employed in environmental epidemiology are:

- Cohort studies
- Case-control studies
- Cross-sectional studies

=== Estimating risk ===
Epidemiologic studies that assess how an environmental exposure and a health outcome may be connected use a variety of biostatistical approaches to attempt to quantify the relationship. Risk assessment tries to answer questions such as "How does an individual's risk for disease A change when they are exposed to substance B?," and "How many excess cases of disease A can we prevent if exposure to substance B is lowered by X amount?."

Some statistics and approaches used to estimate risk are:

- Odds ratio
- Relative risk
- Hazards ratio
- Regression modeling
- Mortality rates
- Attributable risk

=== Landmark Studies ===
British Doctors Study

In 1950, Richard Doll and Austin Bradford Hill published a case-control study in the British Medical Journal demonstrating a strong association between tobacco smoking and carcinoma of the lung, which is recognized as the first large study to provide a level of certainty about this causal link. During the first half of the twentieth century, a dramatic increase in lung cancer deaths had been observed in Britain, and Doll and Hill showed that the risk of lung cancer was associated with the number of cigarettes smoked per day. In October 1951, Doll and Hill launched what became known as the British Doctors' Study, sending a questionnaire about smoking habits to all doctors living in the United Kingdom. The study continued for over 50 years, and follow-up questionnaires were sent in 1957, 1966, 1971, 1978, 1991, 19998, and 2001 to measure longitudinal changes in smoking behavior and health outcomes. In subsequent publications, Doll and Hill reported an association between smoking and lung cancer as well as cancers of the upper respiratory and digestive tracts, chronic bronchitis, coronary disease, and peptic ulcer. As a strong example of how scientific evidence shapes public policy, these findings provided a formative basis for public anti-tobacco policy, including tobacco tax increases, advertising campaigns, and the funding of research for smoking cessation drugs.

Harvard “Six Cities” study

The Harvard “Six Cities” study was a major prospective cohort study published by Douglas Dockery and C. Arden Pope, in the New England Journal of Medicine in 1993, demonstrating that residents of cities with higher levels of fine particulate matter (PM2.5) experienced significantly elevated mortality rates. This study was initially motivated as a response to the energy crisis following the 1970s oil embargo when the U.S. anticipated increased reliance on coal, which prompted fears of worsening air pollution. The study was conducted for 16 years from 1974 to 1990, and the researchers tracked over 8,000 adults across six cities: Watertown, Mass.; Kingston-Harriman, Tenn.; St. Louis, Missouri; Steubenville, Ohio; Portage, Wis. and Topeka, Kansas. The study used cox proportional-hazards regression modeling and controlled for individual risk factors such as smoking to estimate the effects of air pollution on mortality. In 1994 the American Lung Association filed a major lawsuit against the Environmental Protection Agency (EPA) to force the implementation of stricter air pollution standards, using the "Six Cities" data as key scientific evidence. This ultimately led to the EPA establishing the first National Ambient Air Quality Standards for PM2.5 in 1997.

Needleman's Lead and Child Cognition Study

In 1979, pediatrician Herbert Needleman published a cross-sectional study in the New England Journal of Medicine examining the relationship between chronic low-level lead exposure and cognitive development in children. The study demonstrated that Boston-area children with higher accumulations of lead had, on average, five or six fewer IQ points than those with lower accumulations who were of the same neighborhood, ethnic background, and economic status. This study produced important results because it established that environmental contamination at levels previously regarded as “normal” could still be dangerous in industrialized countries which was a paradigm shift from the consensus at the time that poisoning generally happened in terms of acute exposure. These findings were instrumental in convincing the Centers for Disease Control and Prevention to issue guidelines for the diagnosis and management of lead poisoning in children, in prompting the Environmental Protection Agency to mandate the removal of lead from gasoline. U.S. An eleven-year follow-up study published in 1990 confirmed the persistence of these cognitive deficits into young adulthood, reinforcing the original findings and strengthening the case for primary prevention.

=== Ethics ===
Environmental epidemiology studies often identify associations between pollutants in the air, water, or food and adverse health outcomes; these findings can be inconvenient for polluting industries. Environmental epidemiologists are confronted with significant ethical challenges because of the involvement of powerful stakeholders who may try to influence the results or interpretation of their studies. Epidemiologic findings can sometimes have direct effects on industry profits. Because of these concerns, environmental epidemiology maintains guidelines for ethical practice. The International Society for Environmental Epidemiology (ISEE) first adopted ethics guidelines in the late 1990s. The guidelines are maintained by its Ethics and Philosophy Committee, one of the earliest, active, and enduring ethics committees in the field of epidemiology. Since its inception in 1991, the Committee has taken an active role in supporting ethical conduct and promulgating Ethics Guidelines for Environmental Epidemiologists. The most recent Ethics Guidelines were adopted in 2023.

Bradford Hill factors

To differentiate between correlation and causation, epidemiologists often consider a set of factors to determine the likelihood that an observed relationship between an environmental exposure and health consequence is truly causal. In 1965, Austin Bradford Hill devised a set of postulates to help him determine if there was sufficient evidence to conclude that cigarette smoking causes lung cancer.

The Bradford Hill criteria are:

1. Strength of association
2. Consistency of evidence
3. Specificity
4. Temporality
5. Biological gradient
6. Plausibility
7. Coherence
8. Experiment
9. Analogy

These factors are generally considered to be a guide to scientists, and it is not necessary that all of the factors be met for a consensus to be reached.

== See also ==
- Epidemiology
- Envirome
- Environmental health
- Environmental science
- Epigenetics
- Exposome
- Occupational epidemiology
- Occupational safety and health
- Pollution
  - Air pollution
