= International Society for Environmental Epidemiology =

International Society for Environmental Epidemiology (ISEE)
- Formation: 1987
- Headquarters: Herndon, Virginia, United States
- Members: >1,300
- Website: iseepi.org

The International Society for Environmental Epidemiology (ISEE) is a scientific society with membership drawn from more than 60 countries, dedicated to the study of environmental epidemiology and exposure assessment. It provides a forum for the discussion of problems unique to the study of health and the environment. The primary objective of ISEE is to promote research and disseminate scientific findings focused on the relationships between environmental exposures (e.g., air pollutants, food and water contaminants, metals, etc.) and human health. Each year, ISEE puts a spotlight on global discussion of environmental health and gathers scientists from all over the world to discuss measuring harmful factors in the environment including environmental health after disasters, e-waste, endocrine disrupting chemicals affecting pregnancy, and more. These include annual meetings, newsletters, workshops and liaisons with academic, governmental, inter-governmental, non-profit and business institutions.

ISEE was founded in 1987 and held its first formal scientific meeting in 1989. ISEE supports the dissemination of scientific results and international collaborations by hosting annual conferences in all regions of the world.

The ISEE supports the involvement of scientists from developing countries and students through targeted programs and reduced dues rates.

== Annual meeting ==
ISEE's annual meeting comprises a programme of diverse scientific sessions that cover new research and emerging trends in environmental research, epidemiology, public policy, and exposure assessment.

== Committees ==
ISEE is composed of nine committees, including an Annual Conference Committee, an Awards Committee, a Capacity Building and Education Committee, a Communications Committee, an Ethics and Philosophy Committee, a Membership Committee, a Nominations Committee, a Policy Committee, and a Student & New Researchers Network.

== Regional chapters ==
The society supports regional chapters in Africa, Asia, Eastern Mediterranean, Europe, Latin America and the Caribbean, and North America. Each chapter focuses on local and regional issues that are of particular interest to their members.
