= Cohort study =

Form of longitudinal study

A cohort study is a particular form of longitudinal study that samples a cohort (a group of people who share a defining characteristic, typically those who experienced a common event in a selected period, such as birth or graduation), performing a cross-section at intervals through time.

Cohort studies represent one of the fundamental designs of epidemiology which are used in research in the fields of medicine, pharmacy, nursing, psychology, social science, and in any field reliant on 'difficult to reach' answers that are based on evidence (statistics). In medicine for instance, while clinical trials are used primarily for assessing the safety of newly developed pharmaceuticals before they are approved for sale, epidemiological analysis on how risk factors affect the incidence of diseases is often used to identify the causes of diseases in the first place, and to help provide pre-clinical justification for the plausibility of protective factors (treatments).

== Comparison with controlled trials ==
Cohort studies differ from clinical trials in that no intervention, treatment, or exposure is administered to participants in a cohort design; and no control group is defined. Rather, cohort studies are largely about the life histories of segments of populations and the individual people who constitute these segments. Exposures or protective factors are identified as preexisting characteristics of participants. The study is controlled by including other common characteristics of the cohort in the statistical analysis. Both exposure/treatment and control variables are measured at baseline. Participants are then followed over time to observe the incidence rate of the disease or outcome in question. Regression analysis can then be used to evaluate the extent to which the exposure or treatment variable contributes to the incidence of the disease, while accounting for other variables that may be at play.

Double-blind randomized controlled trials (RCTs) are generally considered superior methodology in the hierarchy of evidence in treatment, because they allow for the most control over other variables that could affect the outcome, and the randomization and blinding processes reduce bias in the study design. This minimizes the chance that results will be influenced by confounding variables, particularly ones that are unknown. However, educated hypotheses based on prior research and background knowledge are used to select variables to be included in the regression model for cohort studies, and statistical methods can be used to identify and account for potential confounders from these variables. Bias can also be mitigated in a cohort study when selecting participants for the cohort.

RCTs may not be suitable in all cases; such as when the outcome is a negative health effect and the exposure is hypothesized to be a risk factor for the outcome. Ethical standards, and morality, would prevent the use of risk factors in RCTs. The natural or incidental exposure to these risk factors (e.g. time spent in the sun), or self-administered exposure (e.g. smoking), can be measured without subjecting participants to risk factors outside of their individual lifestyles, habits, and choices.

== Types ==
Cohort studies can be retrospective (looking back in time, thus using existing data such as medical records or claims database) or prospective (requiring the collection of new data). Retrospective cohort studies restrict the investigators' ability to reduce confounding and bias because collected information is restricted to data that already exists. There are advantages to this design, however, as retrospective studies are much cheaper and faster because the data has already been collected and stored.

A cohort is a group of people who share a common characteristic or experience within a defined period (e.g., are currently living, are exposed to a drug or vaccine or pollutant, or undergo a certain medical procedure). Thus a group of people who were born on a day or in a particular period, say 1948, form a birth cohort. The comparison group may be the general population from which the cohort is drawn, or it may be another cohort of persons thought to have had little or no exposure to the substance under investigation, but otherwise similar. Alternatively, subgroups within the cohort may be compared with each other.

== Application ==
In medicine, a cohort study is often undertaken to obtain evidence to try to refute the existence of a suspected association between cause and effect; failure to refute a hypothesis often strengthens confidence in it. Crucially, the cohort is identified before the appearance of the disease under investigation. The study groups follow a group of people who do not have the disease for a period of time and see who develops the disease (new incidence). The cohort cannot therefore be defined as a group of people who already have the disease. Prospective (longitudinal) cohort studies between exposure and disease strongly aid in studying causal associations, though distinguishing true causality usually requires further corroboration from further experimental trials.

The advantage of prospective cohort study data is that it can help determine risk factors for contracting a new disease because it is a longitudinal observation of the individual through time, and the collection of data at regular intervals, so recall error is reduced. However, cohort studies are expensive to conduct, are sensitive to attrition and take a long follow-up time to generate useful data. Nevertheless, the results that are obtained from long-term cohort studies are of substantially superior quality to those obtained from retrospective/cross-sectional studies. Prospective cohort studies are considered to yield the most reliable results in observational epidemiology. They enable a wide range of exposure-disease associations to be studied.

Some cohort studies track groups of children from their birth, and record a wide range of information (exposures) about them. The value of a cohort study depends on the researchers' capacity to stay in touch with all members of the cohort. Some studies have continued for decades.

In a cohort study, the population under investigation consists of individuals who are at risk of developing a specific disease or health outcome.

== Examples ==
An example of an epidemiological question that can be answered using a cohort study is whether exposure to X (say, smoking) associates with outcome Y (say, lung cancer). For example, in 1951, the British Doctors Study was started. Using a cohort which included both smokers (the exposed group) and non-smokers (the unexposed group). The study continued through 2001. By 1956, the study provided convincing proof of the association between smoking and the incidence of lung cancer. In a cohort study, the groups are matched in terms of many other variables such as economic status and other health status so that the variable being assessed, the independent variable (in this case, smoking) can be isolated as the cause of the dependent variable (in this case, lung cancer). In this example, a statistically significant increase in the incidence of lung cancer in the smoking group as compared to the non-smoking group is evidence in favor of the hypothesis. However, rare outcomes, such as lung cancer, are generally not studied with the use of a cohort study, but are rather studied with the use of a case-control study.

In the Arts, Cohort Succession can explain most change in literature, art, intellectualism, political opinions, and phonology.

Shorter term studies are commonly used in medical research as a form of clinical trial, or means to test a particular hypothesis of clinical importance. Such studies typically follow two groups of patients for a period of time and compare an endpoint or outcome measure between the two groups.

Randomized controlled trials, or RCTs, are a superior methodology in the hierarchy of evidence, because they limit the potential for bias by randomly assigning one patient pool to an intervention and another patient pool to non-intervention (or placebo). This minimizes the chance that the incidence of confounding variables will differ between the two groups. Nevertheless, it is sometimes not practical or ethical to perform RCTs to answer a clinical question. To take our example, if we already had reasonable evidence that smoking causes lung cancer then persuading a pool of non-smokers to take up smoking in order to test this hypothesis would generally be considered unethical.

Two examples of cohort studies that have been going on for more than 50 years are the Framingham Heart Study and the National Child Development Study (NCDS), the most widely researched of the British birth cohort studies. Key findings of NCDS and a detailed profile of the study appear in the International Journal of Epidemiology.

The Dunedin Multidisciplinary Health and Development Study has been studying the thousand people born in Dunedin, New Zealand, in 1972–1973. The subjects are interviewed regularly, with Phase (age) 52 starting in 2024.

The largest cohort study in women is the Nurses' Health Study. Starting in 1976, it is tracking over 120,000 nurses and has been analyzed for many different conditions and outcomes.

The largest cohort study in Africa is the Birth to Twenty Study, which began in 1990 and tracks a cohort of over 3,000 children born in the weeks following Nelson Mandela's release from prison.

Other famous examples are the Grant Study tracking a number of Harvard graduates from ca. 1950.77, the Whitehall Study tracking 10,308 British civil servants, and the Caerphilly Heart Disease Study, which since 1979 has studied a representative sample of 2,512 men, drawn from the Welsh town of Caerphilly.

The ASPREE-XT study is designed to determine whether there are long-lasting effects of an average of four–five years of treatment with daily low-dose aspirin, with outcome measures including cancer mortality. As of September 2018, there were 16,703 ASPREE-XT participants in Australia. It has been proposed that the existing ASPREE-XT study could provide a platform for a future multigenerational research study.

== Variations ==
Comparison of timelines of case-control and cohort studies. "OR" stands for "odds ratio" and "RR" stands for "relative risk".

The diagram indicates the starting point and direction of cohort and case-control studies. In case-control studies the analysis proceeds from documented disease and investigations are made to arrive at the possible causes of the disease. In cohort studies the assessment starts with the putative cause of disease, and observations are made of the occurrence of disease relative to the hypothesized causal agent.

=== Current and historical cohorts ===
A current cohort study represents a true prospective study where the data concerning exposure are assembled prior to the occurrence of the fact to be studied, for instance a disease. An example of a current cohort study is the Oxford Family Planning Association Study in the United Kingdom, which aimed to provide a balanced view of the beneficial and harmful effects of different methods of contraception. This study has provided a large amount of information on the efficacy and safety of contraceptive methods, and in particular oral contraceptives (OCs), diaphragms and intrauterine device (IUDs).

In a historical cohort study the data concerning exposure and occurrence of a disease, births, a political attitude or any other categorical variable are collected after the events have taken place, and the subjects (those exposed and unexposed to the agent under study) are assembled from existing records or health care registers.

A "prospective cohort" defines the groups before the study is done, while historical studies, which are sometimes referred to as "retrospective cohort", define the grouping after the data is collected. Examples of a retrospective cohort are Long-Term Mortality after Gastric Bypass Surgery and The Lothian Birth Cohort Studies.

Although historical studies are sometimes referred to as retrospective study, it a misnomer as the methodological principles of historical cohort studies and prospective studies are the same.

=== Nested case-control study ===
A nested case-control study is a case control nested inside of a cohort study. The procedure begins like a normal cohort study, however, as participants develop the outcome of interest they are selected as cases. Once the cases are identified, controls are selected and matched to each case. The process for selecting and matching cases is identical to a normal case control study. An example of a nested case-control study is Inflammatory markers and the risk of coronary heart disease in men and women, which was a case control analyses extracted from the Framingham Heart Study cohort.

Nested case-controls have the advantage of reducing the number of participants that require details follow up or diagnostic testing to assess outcome or exposure status. However, this will also reduce the power of the study, when compared to larger cohort the study population is drawn from.

=== Household panel survey ===
Panel surveys are another important sub-type of longitudinal study. They differ from cohort studies by starting with representative cross-sectional samples, rather than cohorts defined by an event. Household panels draw representative samples of households and survey them, following all individuals through time on a usual annual basis. Examples include the US Panel Study of Income Dynamics (since 1968), the German Socio-Economic Panel (since 1984), the British Household Panel Survey (since 1991) and (since 2009) its successor Understanding Society: the UK Household Longitudinal Study, the Household, Income and Labour Dynamics in Australia Survey (since 2001) and the European Community Household Panel (1994–2001).

=== Cohort analysis in business ===
For an example in business analysis, see cohort analysis.

=== AI for cohort study ===
Conventionally, cohort studies require manual definitions of the common characteristics, which are time-consuming and labor-intensive, demanding extensive domain expertise. To address these limitations, researchers have increasingly explored the integration of AI technologies (e.g., CohortNet. COOL) to automate the identification of cohorts with their definitions. For example, in healthcare, we can identify patients with a certain combination of feature conditions as a specific cohort, typically resulting in a similar outcome or end-point. Once the cohort is identified, we further learn the commonalities among the associated patients and obtain meaningful cohort representations. These AI-derived cohorts not only enhance the ability to evaluate new patients but also hold significant potential to accelerate medical research and discovery.

== See also ==
- Cohort (statistics)
- Community of position
- Panel analysis
- Panel data
