= Information bias (epidemiology) =

Bias arising from measurement error

In epidemiology, information bias refers to the bias that arises when there is misclassification of a binary/categorical variable or measurement error of a continuous variable. Misclassification and measurement error can apply to the exposure, outcome, and/or covariates. Common sources of information bias include recall bias, social desirability bias, poor sensitivity of a test, laboratory error, and data entry error.

== Types of information bias ==
=== Exposure misclassification ===
Misclassification of exposure can be characterized into two groups: non-differential exposure misclassification and differential misclassification.

==== Nondifferential exposure misclassification ====
Nondifferential exposure misclassification occurs when the probability of exposure misclassification does not depend on the true outcome status. It has traditionally been assumed that in the case of binary or dichotomous variables nondifferential misclassification biases the relationship between exposure and outcome towards the null. However, this has more recently been challenged in that results of individual studies represent a single estimate and not the average of repeated measurements and thus can be farther (or nearer) from the null value (i.e. zero) than the true value.

===== Differential exposure misclassification =====
Differential misclassification occurs when the probability of exposure misclassification depends on another variable (typically the outcome). For example, in a study examining the impact of statins on dementia incidence, dementia patients may be less likely to remember their statin dosage than those dementia. The effect(s) of such misclassification are unpredictable and may over or under estimate the true causal relationship.

== Methods to address information bias ==
Statisticians have developed methods to adjust for information bias, which may assist somewhat in compensating for this problem when known and when it is quantifiable.
