= Donnatal =

Combination medication

Donnatal is a combination medication that provides natural belladonna alkaloids in a specific fixed ratio combined with phenobarbital to provide peripheral anticholinergic/antispasmodic action and mild sedation. Donnatal is manufactured for Concordia Pharmaceuticals by IriSys, LLC. It is available as tablets and 5 mL elixir. Active ingredients are listed as: phenobarbital (16.2 mg), hyoscyamine sulfate (0.1037 mg), atropine sulfate (0.0194 mg), and scopolamine hydrobromide (0.0065 mg). The latter two ingredients are found in plants of the family Solanaceae, such as belladonna.

== Indication ==
Based on a review of this drug by the National Academy of Sciences–National Research Council and/or other information, FDA has classified the indications as follows: "possibly" effective: For use as adjunctive therapy in the treatment of irritable bowel syndrome (irritable colon, spastic colon, mucous colitis) and acute enterocolitis. May also be useful as adjunctive therapy in the treatment of duodenal ulcer.

== History ==
=== Clinical Research with Combinations of Belladonna Alkaloids and Phenobarbital ===
Clinical studies have been performed on different combinations of belladonna alkaloids and phenobarbital over the last 70 years. For example, Steigmann et al. evaluated a combination of 0.25 mg belladonna alkaloids and 50 mg phenobarbital on gastrointestinal symptoms in 93 patients. The population included 33 IBS patients. Eighteen out of 33 patients reported complete relief of symptoms and 13 reported fair response with partial relief within 24 hours. Only 2 IBS patients reported no response. A small assessment of sustained release of 0.4 mg belladonna alkaloids and ~60 mg phenobarbital (1 grain) was performed in patients with functional GI disorders (i.e., gastric hyperacidity, dyspepsia, pyrosis, gas pains and epigastric distress. Overall, 23 of 25 patients reported complete or significant relief of symptoms. Hock also examined the effect of 0.25 mg belladonna alkaloids and 50 mg phenobarbital sustained release formulation in 82 clinical practice patients with various gastrointestinal disturbances including “functional distress” over 27 months. Of the 82 total patients, 33 patients reported a 50-75% and 20 reported a 75-100% improvement. There were specific reports of improvements in pain and bowel habits in over half of the patients.

One of the earliest randomized double-blind clinical trials of belladonna alkaloids + phenobarbital was in 1959 by Lichstein et al. The study involved 75 patients with unstable bowel (whose symptoms are typical or similar to a current diagnosis of IBS) to investigate the combination therapy of an anticholinergic with the addition of phenobarbital against placebo over 15 months. Of these patients, 20 were treated with placebo, 43 were treated with 50 mg phenobarbital in combination with 0.25 mg Belladonna alkaloids, and 12 received both therapies (patients who lacked a response were switched therapy). Of those receiving the belladonna alkaloids / phenobarbital only, 75.6% reported a mean improvement (2+ or better) in all categories. Among the placebo patients only, only 29.8% reported mean improvement in symptoms. When improvement was clinically assessed, 69% of belladonna alkaloids/phenobarbital patients were reported to improve compared to 24% of placebo patients. For the 12 patients who were switched therapies, it was found that they originally were given placebo and switched to treatment therapy. While on placebo, 11.1% of patients reported a mean improvement, whereas 55.5% reported mean improvement on treatment therapy. The authors noted that the response for patients on placebo was rather quick with immediate effects. Further, they noted that among patients with diarrhea, 100% reported an improvement while 53.2% of those with constipation reported an improvement. In several patients with constipation, fiber and laxatives also were provided. In patients where constipation was the chief complaint, the authors noted that they failed to respond.

Several office-belladonna alkaloids ed case series also presented positive outcomes for almost 1,000 patients on the effect of belladonna alkaloids and phenobarbital formulations in irritable colon, other functional disorders, and gastric/duodenal.

=== Donnatal clinical research ===
A. H. Robins developed and began marketing Donnatal® in the 1940s. Two studies have been performed over the years specifically with the Donnatal® formulation. Steigmann and Kaminski examined the antisecretory effect of 0.1296 mg belladonna alkaloids + 16.2 mg phenobarbital (Donnatal®) in peptic ulcer patients, motility in a subgroup of patients and clinical effects in all patients (N =176). Of the IBS patients (n =66), a reported good response with complete relief was found in 53% of male patients and 58% of female patients. Fair response with partial improvement was noted in 37% of male patients and 34% of female patients. No response was reported in 10% of male and 8% of female IBS patients. There were few side effects noted with 8% reporting dry mouth. Dosages were reduced in patients who reported drowsiness (10%) as well as 1 patient who reported visual disturbance. Otherwise, the formulation was well tolerated.

Donnatal also is a common component of a GI cocktail used in emergency rooms. In 1976, Donnatal was one of the 25 most widely prescribed drugs in the U.S. It has since been displaced by H_{2} antagonists and proton pump inhibitors, which are more effective and lack many of the adverse effects of phenobarbital.

=== FDA status ===
Donnatal® is considered part of the DESI drug category and currently is listed as one of 14 drugs still under evaluation by the FDA. In response to FDA questions about Donnatal® efficacy, A. H. Robins Co. filed abbreviated new drug applications for Donnatal® tablets (ANDA 86-676), capsules (ANDA 86-677), and Elixir (ANDA 86-661). These ANDAs, with the exception of the capsule formulation, are still in force today and the FDA has not changed the review status of Donnatal® as being conditionally approved for its indication.

On September 29, 2011, the FDA issued new guidance with regard to the DESI category. This effectively disallowed any new DESI formulations to enter the market. The FDA also has stated that DESI drugs do not have any therapeutic equivalent drugs listed in the “Orange Book”. In their description of therapeutic equivalence, the FDA specifically cites Donnatal®. Therefore, any so-called generic drugs on the market with similar formulation to DESI drugs, are considered illegal drugs as the FDA has not reviewed their composition or therapeutic equivalence.

Donnatal, although containing phenobarbital, is exempt from the Controlled Substances Act due to the belladonna alkaloids present in the formulation.
