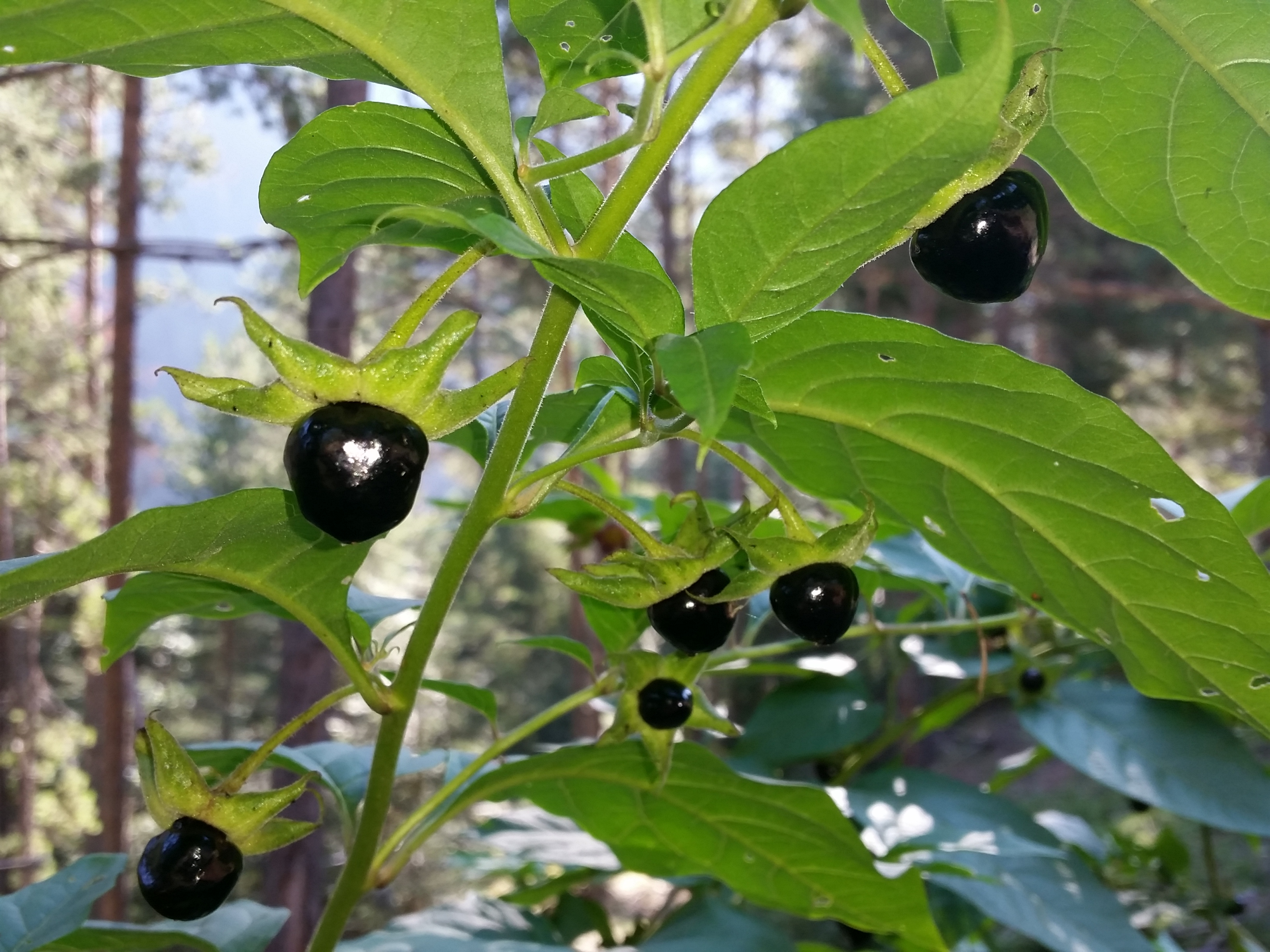

Scientific classification
- Kingdom: Plantae
- Clade: Tracheophytes
- Clade: Angiosperms
- Clade: Eudicots
- Clade: Asterids
- Order: Solanales
- Family: Solanaceae
- Genus: Atropa
- Species: A. belladonna

Binomial name
- Atropa belladonna L.

= Atropa bella-donna =

Deadly nightshade, a flowering plant

Atropa belladonna, commonly known as deadly nightshade or belladonna, is a toxic perennial herbaceous plant in the nightshade family Solanaceae, which also includes tomatoes, potatoes and eggplant. It is native to Europe and Western Asia, including Turkey, its distribution extending from England in the west to western Ukraine and the Iranian province of Gilan in the east. It is also naturalised or introduced in some parts of Canada, North Africa and the United States.

The foliage and berries are extremely toxic when ingested, containing tropane alkaloids. It can also be harmful to handle or touch these plants. These toxins include atropine, scopolamine, and hyoscyamine, which cause delirium and hallucinations, and are also used as pharmaceutical anticholinergics. Tropane alkaloids are of common occurrence not only in the Old World tribes Hyoscyameae (to which the genus Atropa belongs) and Mandragoreae, but also in the New World tribe Datureae—all of which belong to the subfamily Solanoideae of the plant family Solanaceae.

Consumption of Atropa bella-donna has unpredictable effects. The antidote for belladonna poisoning is physostigmine or pilocarpine, the same as for atropine.

The highly toxic ripe fruit can be distinguished from that of black nightshade (Solanum nigrum) by its larger berry size and larger stellate calyx (with long, broad and somewhat accrescent lobes protruding beyond the fruit) and the fact that A. bella-donna bears its berries singly, whilst S. nigrum bears spherical berries resembling tiny tomatoes in umbellate clusters.

== Name ==
As with most names in biology, the scientific name differs from the common name. The common name of this plant is deadly nightshade or simply belladonna. The name entered English when John Gerard used it in his illustrated Herball, or Generall Historie of Plantes, first published in 1597, displacing dwale as the English common name for this plant. The English translation of 1633 was seen as the best and most exhaustive work of its kind and a standard reference for some time.

Its correct scientific name is hyphenated bella-donna. In his original description, Linnaeus called it Atropa bella donna with a space between 'bella' and 'donna', and this space is treated by the International Code of Nomenclature for algae, fungi, and plants (Article 60.12) as an error to be replaced by a hyphen.

== History ==
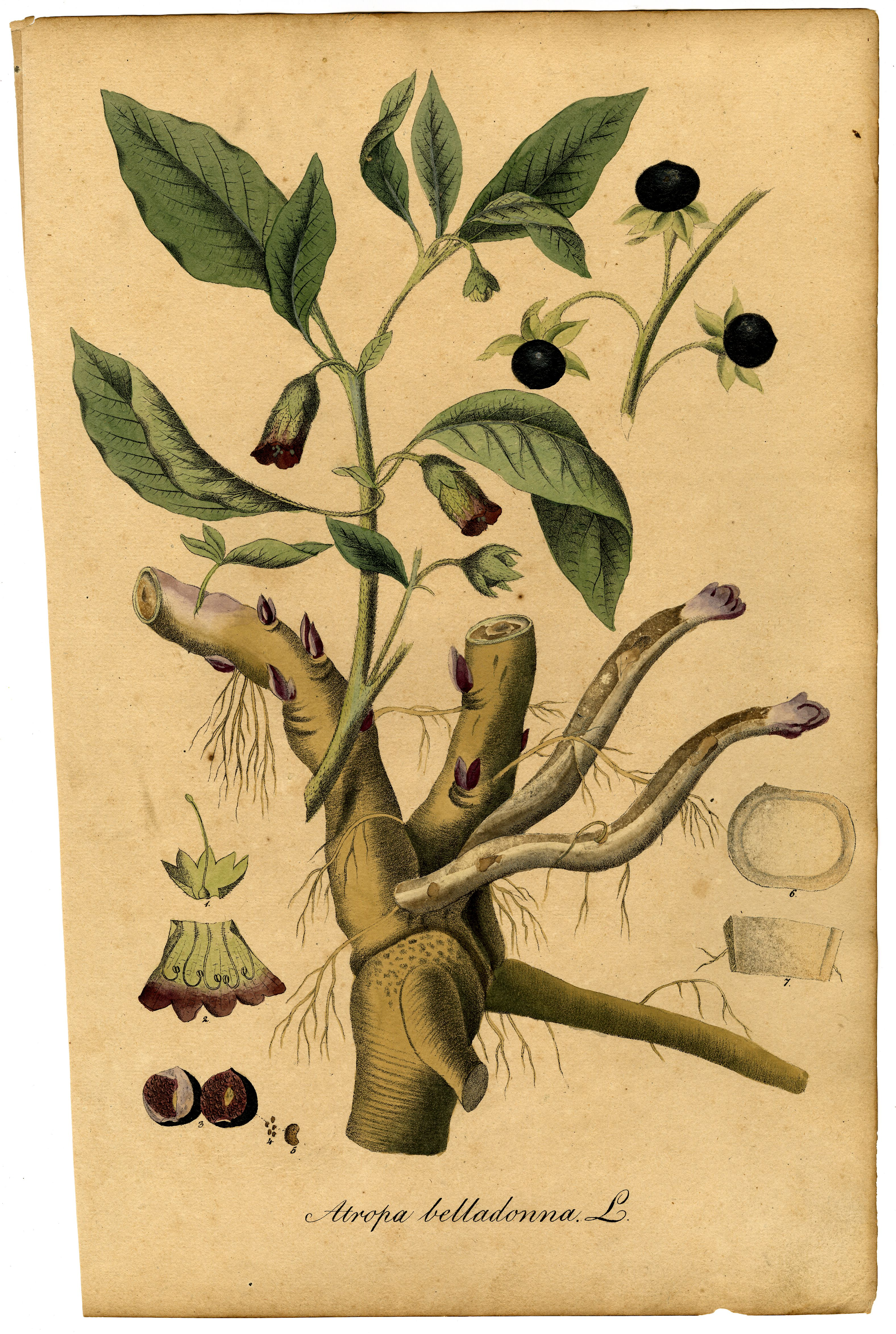
Atropa belladonna by Johann Gottlieb Mann, 1828

Atropa bella-donna has a long history of use as a medicine, cosmetic, and poison. Known originally under various folk names (such as "deadly nightshade" in English), the plant was named Atropa bella-donna by Carl Linnaeus (1707–1778) when he devised his classification system. Linnaeus chose the genus name Atropa because of the poisonous properties of these plants. Atropos (lit. "unturning one"), one of the Three Fates in Greek mythology, is said to have cut a person's thread of life after her sisters had spun and measured it. Linnaeus chose the species name bella-donna ("beautiful woman" in Italian) in reference to the cosmetic use of the plant during the Renaissance.

Extracts of plants in the deadly nightshade family have been in use since at least the 4th century BC, when Mandragora (mandrake) was recommended by Theophrastus for treatment of wounds, gout, and sleeplessness, and as a love potion. In the first century BC, Cleopatra used atropine-rich extracts from the Egyptian henbane plant (also a nightshade) for the above-mentioned purpose of dilating the pupils of her eyes.

The use of deadly nightshades as a poison was known in ancient Rome, as attested by the rumour that the Roman empress Livia Drusilla used the juice of Atropa bella-donna berries to murder her husband, the emperor Augustus.

In the first century AD, Dioscorides recognised wine of mandrake as an anaesthetic for treatment of pain or sleeplessness, to be given prior to surgery or cautery. The use of nightshade preparations for anaesthesia, often in combination with opium, persisted throughout the Roman and Islamic empires and continued in Europe until superseded in the 19th century by modern anaesthetics.

The modern pharmacological study of Atropa bella-donna extracts was begun by the German chemist Friedlieb Ferdinand Runge (1795–1867). In 1831, the German pharmacist Heinrich F. G. Mein (1799–1864) succeeded in preparing a pure crystalline form of the active substance, named atropine.

== Description ==
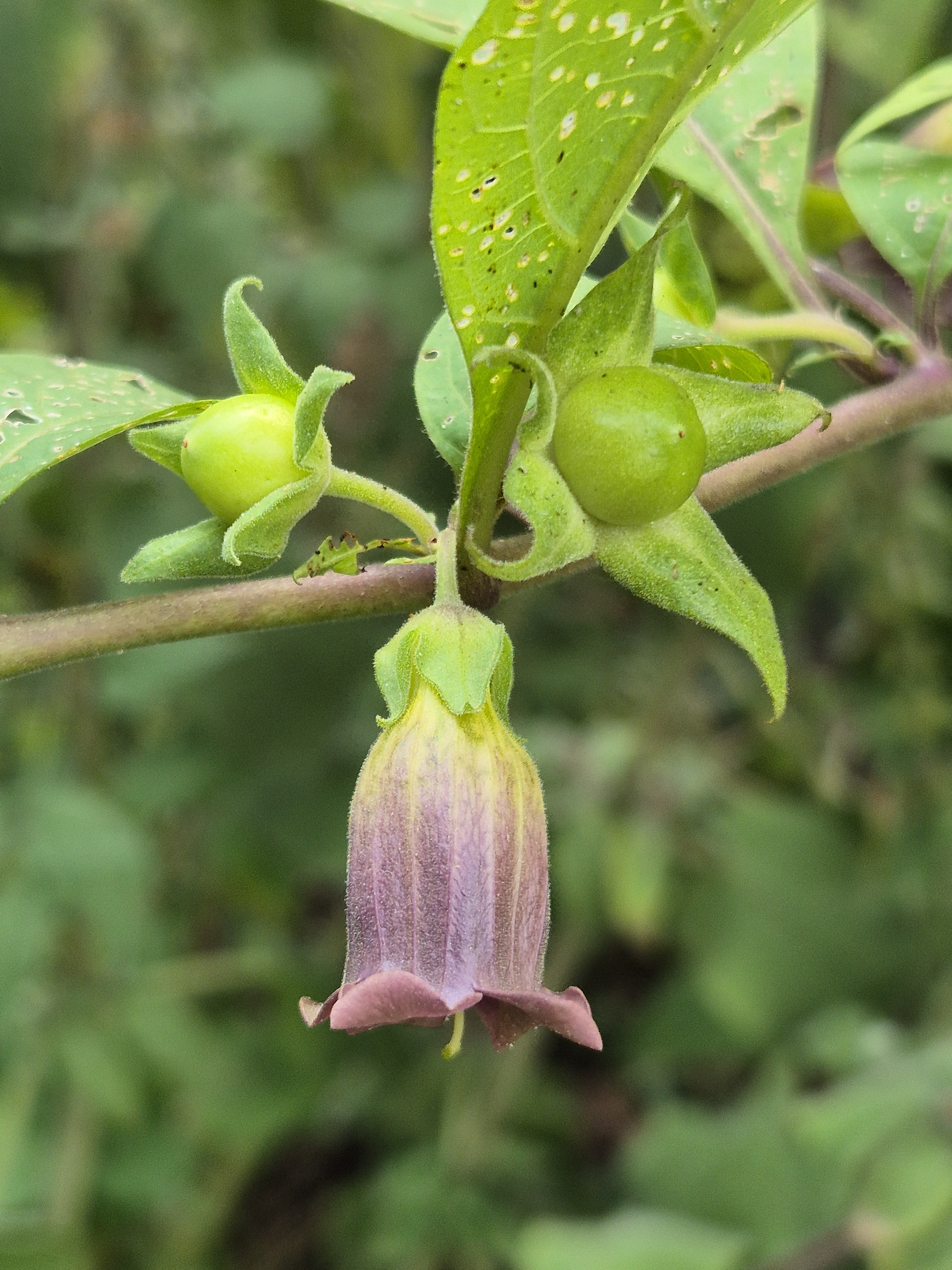
Atropa bella-donna flower

Atropa bella-donna is a branching herbaceous perennial rhizomatous hemicryptophyte, often growing as a subshrub from a fleshy rootstock. Plants can reach a height of 2 m (7 ft) (more commonly 1.5 m (5 ft)), and have ovate leaves up to 18 cm (7 in) long. The bell-shaped flowers are dull purple tinged yellow-green toward the base and are faintly scented. The fruits are berries, which are green, ripening to a shiny black, and approximately 1.5 cm (0.6 in) in diameter. The berries are sweet and are consumed by animals (mainly birds) that disperse the seeds in their droppings, even though they contain toxic alkaloids (see Toxicity). There is a rare variant featuring pale-yellow flowers with pale yellow fruit called Atropa bella-donna var. lutea.

A. bella-donna is sometimes confused with the much less poisonous black nightshade Solanum nigrum, belonging to a different genus within Solanaceae. A comparison of the fruit shows that black nightshade berries are spherical, have a dull lustre and grow in clusters, whereas the berries of deadly nightshade are much glossier, twice as large, somewhat flattened and are borne singly. Another distinction is that black nightshade flowers are not tubular but white and star-shaped, bearing a central cone of yellow anthers.

== Distribution ==
Atropa bella-donna is native across temperate southern, central and eastern Europe, northwestern Africa (Morocco and Algeria), and in southwest Asia in Turkey, Iran and the Caucasus. In the British Isles it is native only in England, where it grows on calcareous soils, on disturbed ground, field margins, hedgerows and open woodland; it is more widespread as an alien, including in Wales, Scotland, and also Ireland, where it is a relic of cultivation as a medicinal herb.

It has long been introduced and cultivated outside its native range, and is now naturalised north and west of its native range in Europe, and in parts of North America, China, Australia, and New Zealand, where it is often found in shady, moist locations with limestone-rich soils. In southern Sweden it was recorded in Flora of Skåne in 1870 as grown in apothecary gardens near Malmö. It is considered a weed species in parts of the world, where it colonises areas with disturbed soils.

== Cultivation ==
Belladonna cultivation, Eli Lilly and Company, 1919

Atropa bella-donna is rarely grown in gardens, but, when grown, it is usually for its large upright habit and showy berries. Germination of the small seeds is often difficult, due to hard seed coats that cause seed dormancy. Germination takes several weeks under alternating temperature conditions, but can be sped up with the use of gibberellic acid. Seedlings require sterile soil to prevent damping off (weakening of seedlings by soil-borne pathogens).

== Taxonomy ==
Atropa bella-donna is in the nightshade family (Solanaceae), which it shares with potatoes, tomatoes, aubergine, thornapple, tobacco, wolfberry, and chili peppers. The common names for this species include deadly nightshade, belladonna, divale, dwale, banewort, devil's berries, death cherries, beautiful death, devil's herb, great morel, and dwayberry.

== Etymology ==
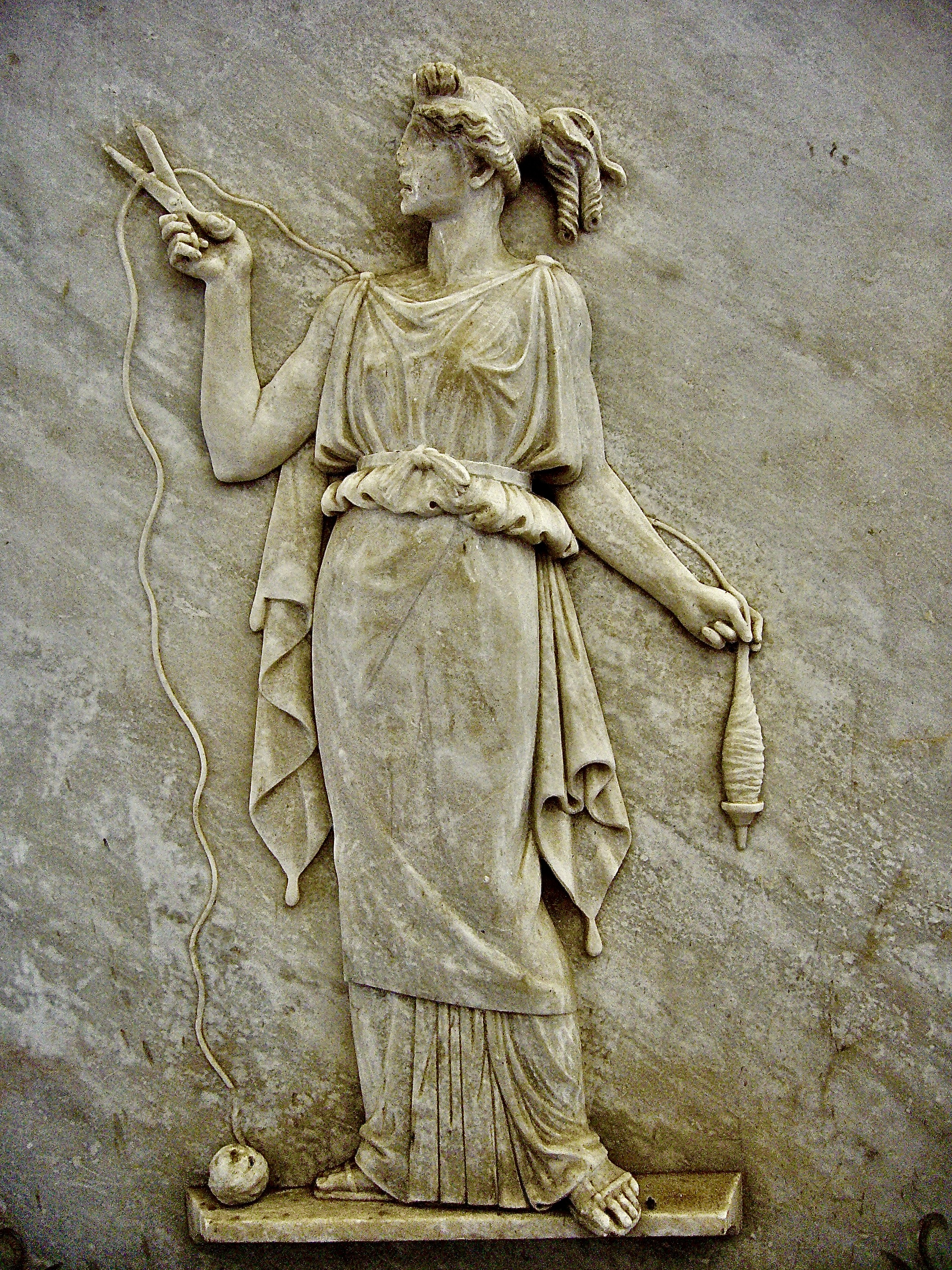
Modern Greek, Parian marble bas relief depicting Atropos severing the thread of life

The name Atropa bella-donna was published by Carl Linnaeus in Species Plantarum in 1753. The genus name Atropa is derived from the name of the Greek goddess Atropos ('she who may not be turned aside' i.e. 'the inflexible' or 'the implacable')—one of the three Moirai (Greek fates or destinies) who determine the course of a man's life by the spinning, winding and finally cutting of the thread that symbolise his birth, the events in his life, and his death, with Atropos being the severer of the thread. The (recently-hyphenated) specific name "bella-donna" is a compound of the Italian words bella and donna, meaning 'beautiful' and 'woman', respectively, originating from its usage as a cosmetic to beautify pallid skin.

== Toxicity ==
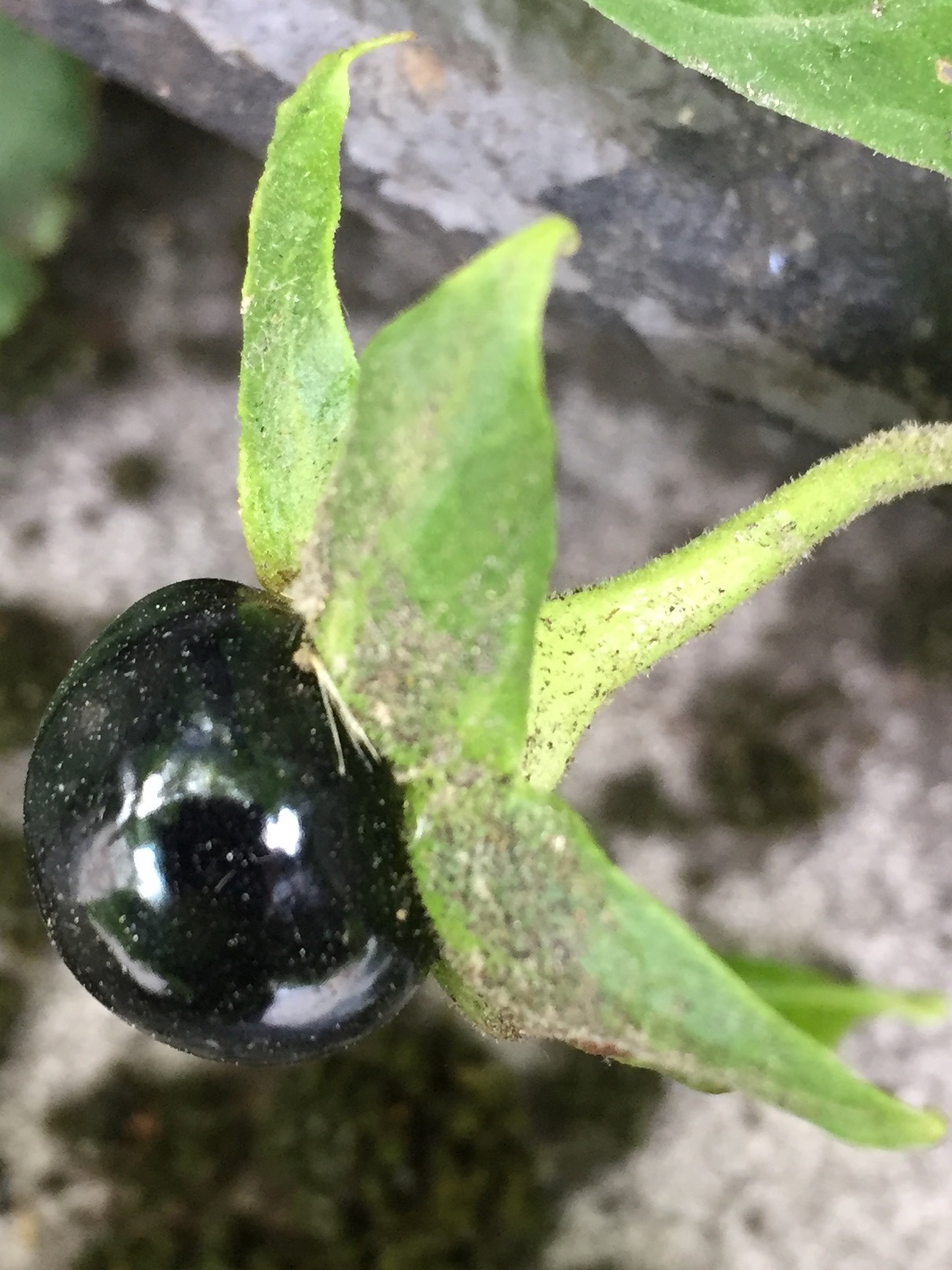
Attractively sweet and cherry-like fruit of Atropa bella-donna

Deadly nightshade is one of the most toxic plants known, and its use by mouth increases risk in numerous clinical conditions, such as complications of pregnancy, cardiovascular diseases, gastrointestinal disorders, and psychiatric disorders, among others. All parts of the plant contain tropane alkaloids; roots have up to 1.3%, (Note: Fresh weight percentages. Dry weight percentages would cut these figures roughly in half.) leaves 1.2%, stalks 0.65%, flowers 0.6%, ripe berries 0.7%, and seeds 0.4% tropane alkaloids; leaves reach maximal alkaloid content when the plant is budding and flowering, roots are most poisonous in the end of the plant's vegetation period. The nectar is used by bees to make honey that also contains tropane alkaloids. The berries pose the greatest danger to children because they look attractive and have a somewhat sweet taste. The root of the plant is generally the most toxic part, though this can vary from one specimen to another.

The active agents in deadly nightshade, atropine, hyoscine (scopolamine), and hyoscyamine, have anticholinergic properties. The symptoms of poisoning include dilated pupils, sensitivity to light, blurred vision, tachycardia, loss of balance, staggering, headache, rash, flushing, severely dry mouth and throat, slurred speech, urinary retention, constipation, confusion, hallucinations, delirium, and convulsions. In 2009, A. bella-donna berries were mistaken for blueberries by an adult woman; the six berries she ate were documented to result in severe anticholinergic syndrome. The deadly symptoms are caused by disruption by the atropine of the parasympathetic nervous system's ability to regulate involuntary activities, such as sweating, breathing, and heart rate. The antidote for belladonna poisoning is an anticholinesterase (such as physostigmine) or a cholinomimetic (such as pilocarpine), the same as for atropine.

Atropa bella-donna is also toxic to many domestic animals, causing narcosis and paralysis. However, cattle and rabbits eat the plant seemingly without suffering harmful effects. In humans, its anticholinergic properties cause the disruption of cognitive capacities, such as memory and learning.

Due to its toxicity, it is advised to not handle the plant without the use of gloves. It is also cautioned to not eat the plant. Even in extremely small doses, when consumed, the toxicity can lead to death. In addition to this, Atropa has been known to have negative psychological effects on those that come into contact with it. Alongside the side effects of insomnia, local paralysis, and dizziness, are the interchanging states of mind swinging from excitement to absolute rabidness.

== Legal status ==
Cultivation is legal in Europe, Pakistan, North America, and Brazil. Belladonna leaves and roots can be bought with a medical prescription in pharmacies throughout Germany. In the United States, drugs containing tropane alkaloids such as atropine are prescription-only, and the FDA regards any over-the-counter products claiming efficacy and safety as an anticholinergic drug to be illegal.

== Uses ==
=== Cosmetics ===
The common name belladonna originates from its historic use by women, as bella donna is Italian for "beautiful woman". It has been widely claimed that drops prepared from the plant were used to dilate women's pupils, an effect considered to be attractive and seductive. Belladonna drops act as a muscarinic antagonist, blocking receptors in the muscles of the eye that constrict pupil size. Belladonna is currently rarely used cosmetically, as it carries the adverse effects of causing minor visual distortions, inability to focus on near objects, and increased heart rate. Prolonged usage was reputed to cause blindness.

=== Dietary supplements ===
In the United States, belladonna is marketed as a dietary supplement, typically as an atropine ingredient in over-the-counter cold medicine products. Although such cold medicine products are probably safe for oral use at typical atropine dosages (0.2 milligram), there is inadequate scientific evidence to assure their effectiveness. By FDA guidelines for supplements, there are no regulated manufacturing standards for cold medicines containing atropine, with some belladonna supplements found to contain contaminants.

=== Medicinal uses ===
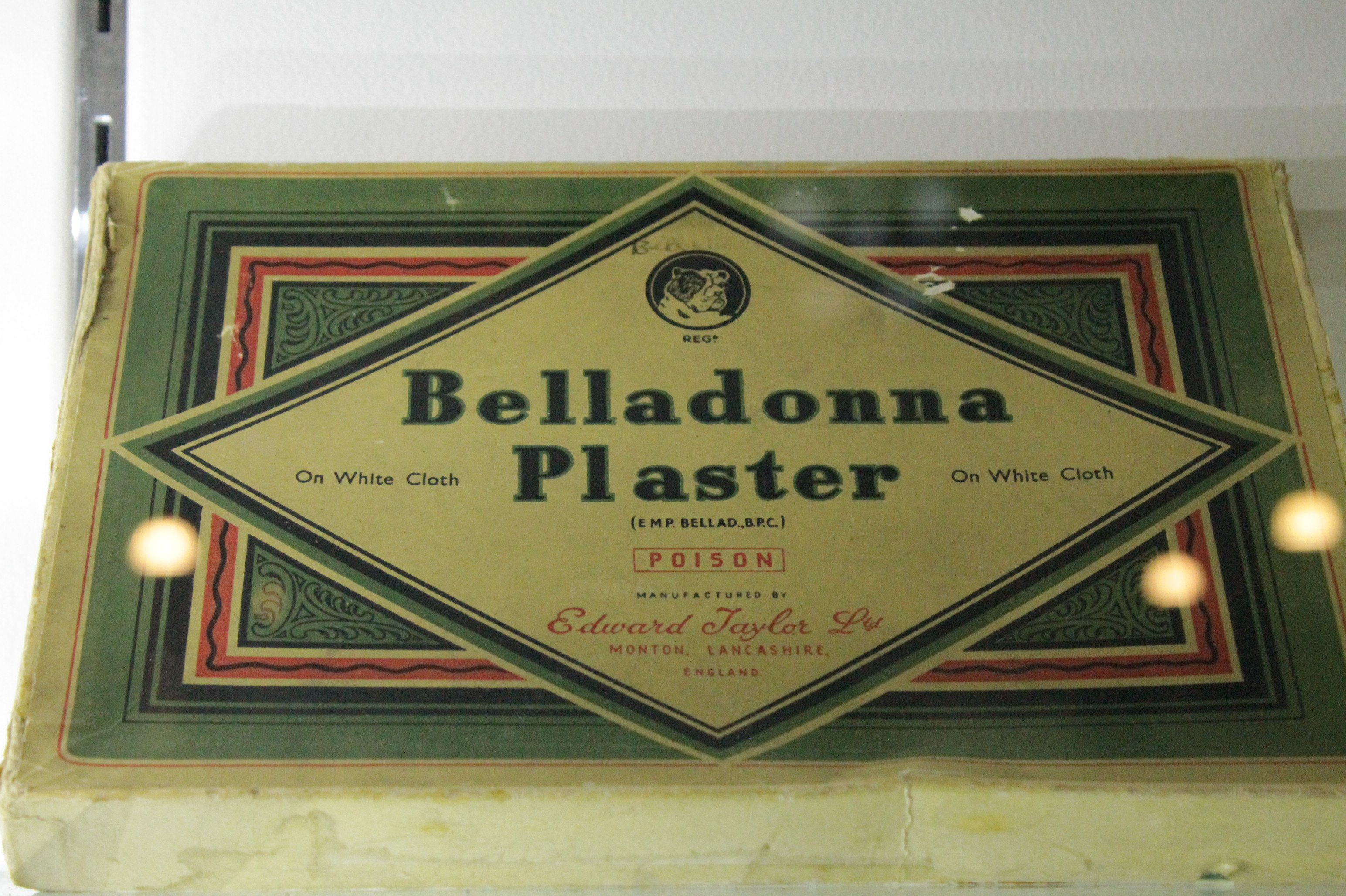
A belladonna plaster, Hunterian Museum, Glasgow

Scientific evidence to recommend the use of A. bella-donna in its natural form for any condition is insufficient, although some of its components, in particular l-atropine, which was purified from belladonna in the 1830s, have accepted medical uses. Donnatal is a prescription pharmaceutical, that combines natural belladonna alkaloids in a specific, fixed ratio with phenobarbital to provide peripheral anticholinergic or antispasmodic action and mild sedation. Donnatal contains 0.0194 mg of atropine. According to the FDA and Donnatal labeling, it is possibly effective for use as adjunctive therapy in the treatment of irritable bowel syndrome (irritable colon, spastic colon, mucous colitis) and acute enterocolitis. Donnatal is not approved by the FDA as being either safe or effective. According to the FDA, Donnatal use has significant risks: it can cause harm to a fetus if administered to a pregnant woman, can lead to heat prostration if used in hot climates, may cause constipation, and may produce drowsiness or blurred vision.

The Towns-Lambert or Bella Donna Cure was a regimen for treating alcoholism in the early 20th century.

==== Alternative medicine and toxicity risk ====
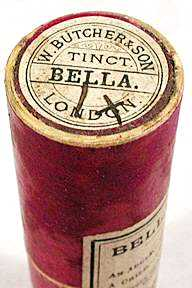
A homeopathic preparation of belladonna

Belladonna has been used in herbal medicine for centuries as a pain reliever, muscle relaxer, and anti-inflammatory, and to treat menstrual problems, peptic ulcer disease, histaminic reaction, and motion sickness.

At least one 19th-century eclectic medicine journal explained how to prepare a belladonna tincture for direct administration. In homeopathic practices, belladonna was prescribed by German physician Samuel Hahnemann as a topical medication for inflammation and pain diluted to such an extent that none of the plant was actually present in the preparation. In the form of Doktor Koster's Antigaspills, belladonna was a homeopathic medication for upset stomach and excessive flatulence, again with no actual belladonna present in the medication. There is insufficient scientific evidence justifying the use of belladonna for these or any other clinical disorders.

In 2010 and 2016, the US Food and Drug Administration warned consumers against the use of homeopathic teething tablets and gels containing belladonna as used for infants and children, stating that the products may be toxic, causing "seizures, difficulty breathing, lethargy, excessive sleepiness, muscle weakness, skin flushing, constipation, difficulty urinating, or agitation" especially for the lower potencies which are, counterintuitively, the ones that are more likely to include belladonna since they are less diluted.

=== Recreational drug ===
Atropa bella-donna and related plants, such as Datura stramonium (commonly known as thornapple or jimson weed), have occasionally been used as recreational drugs because of the vivid hallucinations and delirium they produce. These hallucinations are most commonly described as very unpleasant, and recreational use is considered extremely dangerous because of the high risk of unintentional fatal overdose. The main psychoactive ingredients are the alkaloids scopolamine and, to a lesser extent, hyoscyamine. The effects of atropine on the central nervous system include memory disruption, which may lead to severe confusion. The major effects of belladonna consumption last for three to four hours; visual hallucinations can last for three to four days, and some negative aftereffects are preserved for several days.

=== Poison ===
The tropane alkaloids of A. bella-donna were used as poisons, and early humans made poisonous arrows from the plant. In ancient Rome, it was allegedly used as a poison by Agrippina the Younger, wife of Emperor Claudius, on the advice of Locusta, a woman who specialised in poisons, and Livia, who is rumored to have used it to kill her husband, Emperor Augustus.

The Scots used it during a truce to poison the troops of the invading Harold Harefoot, King of England, to the point that the English troops were unable to stand their ground and had to retreat to their ships.

Medical historians also suspect that Solomon Northup, a free black man who was kidnapped and sold into slavery in 1841, was poisoned using a combination of Atropa bella-donna and laudanum.

== Folklore ==
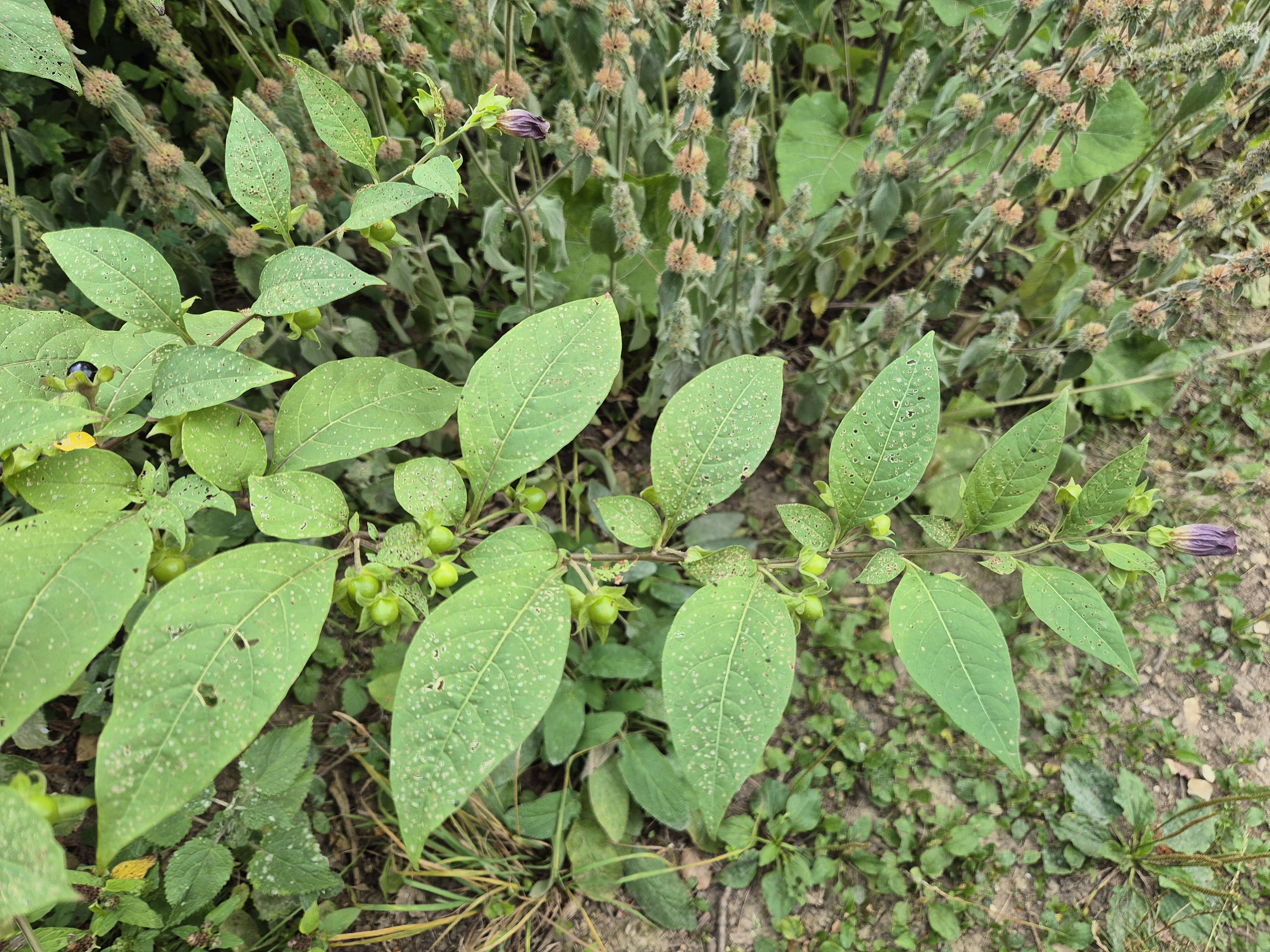
Deadly nightshade leaves

=== Flying ointment ===
In the past, witches were believed to use a mixture of belladonna, opium poppy and other plants, typically poisonous (such as monkshood and hemlock), in flying ointment, which they allegedly applied to help them fly to gatherings with other witches or to experience bacchanalian carousal. Carlo Ginzburg and others have argued that flying ointments were preparations meant to encourage hallucinatory dreaming; a possible explanation for the inclusion of belladonna and opium poppy in flying ointments concerns the known antagonism between tropane alkaloids of belladonna (scopolamine) and opiate alkaloids in the opium poppy, Papaver somniferum (to be specific, morphine), which produces a dream-like waking state (hypnagogia) or potentiated dreams while the user is asleep. This antagonism was known in folk medicine and discussed in traditional medicine formularies. Belladonna is also notable for the unpredictability of its toxic effects.

=== Female attractiveness ===
Among the ancient folk traditions of the Romanian (Moldavian) / Ukrainian region of Bukovina in the Carpathians is the ritual for a Bukovinian girl to enhance her attractiveness by making an offering to deadly nightshade. She entered the fields on a Sunday in Shrovetide, clad in her Sunday best, accompanied by her mother and bringing a bag of bread, salt, and brandy. She would dig up a deadly nightshade root and leave the three offerings in its place. As she returned home, she carried the root on the top of her head. On the way both to and from home, she avoided all quarrels and arguments. If asked by anyone on the way back what she was taking home, she would not divulge the truth or the spell would break.

== Gallery ==
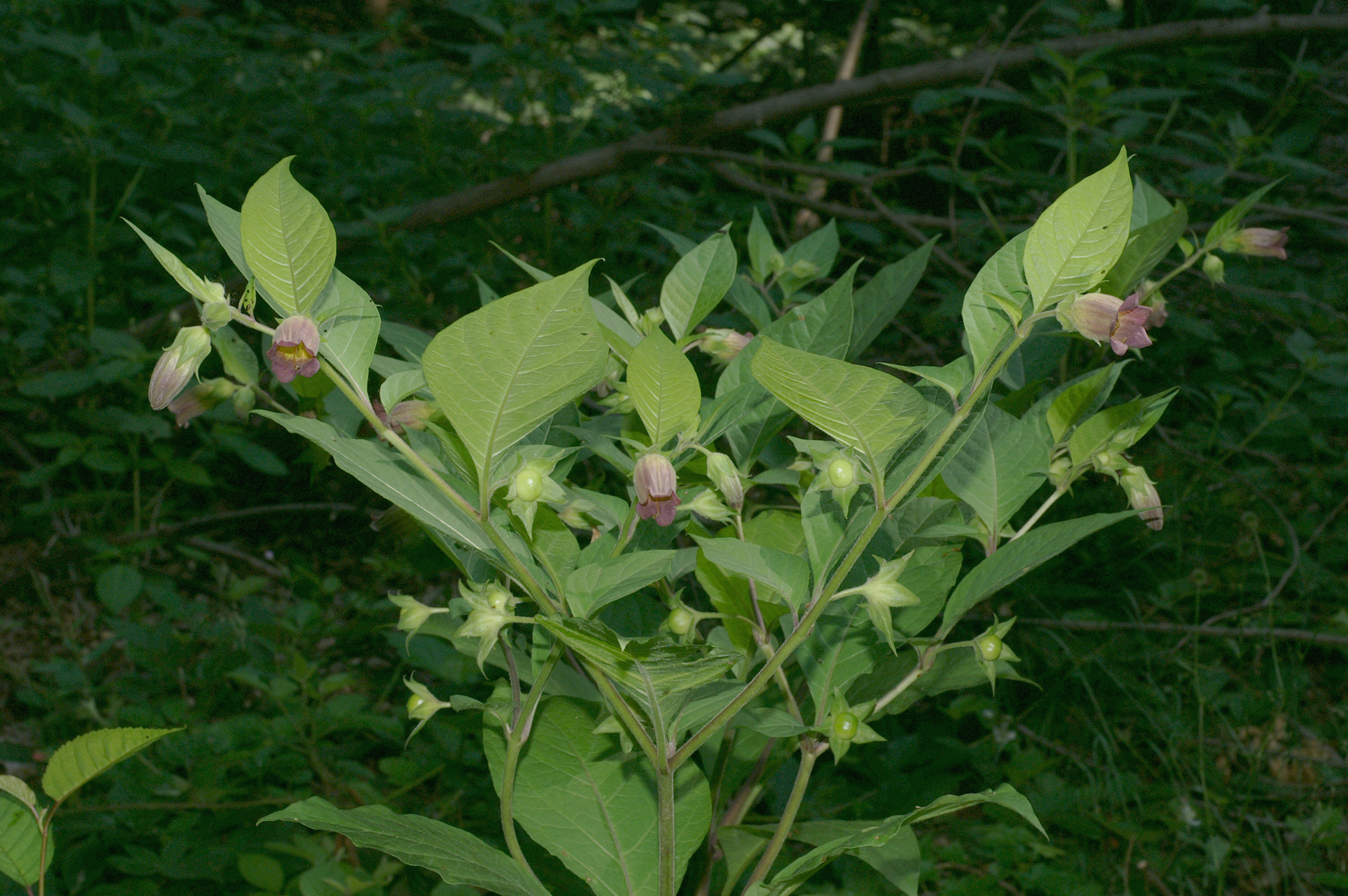
Specimen with abundant flowers and green, immature berries

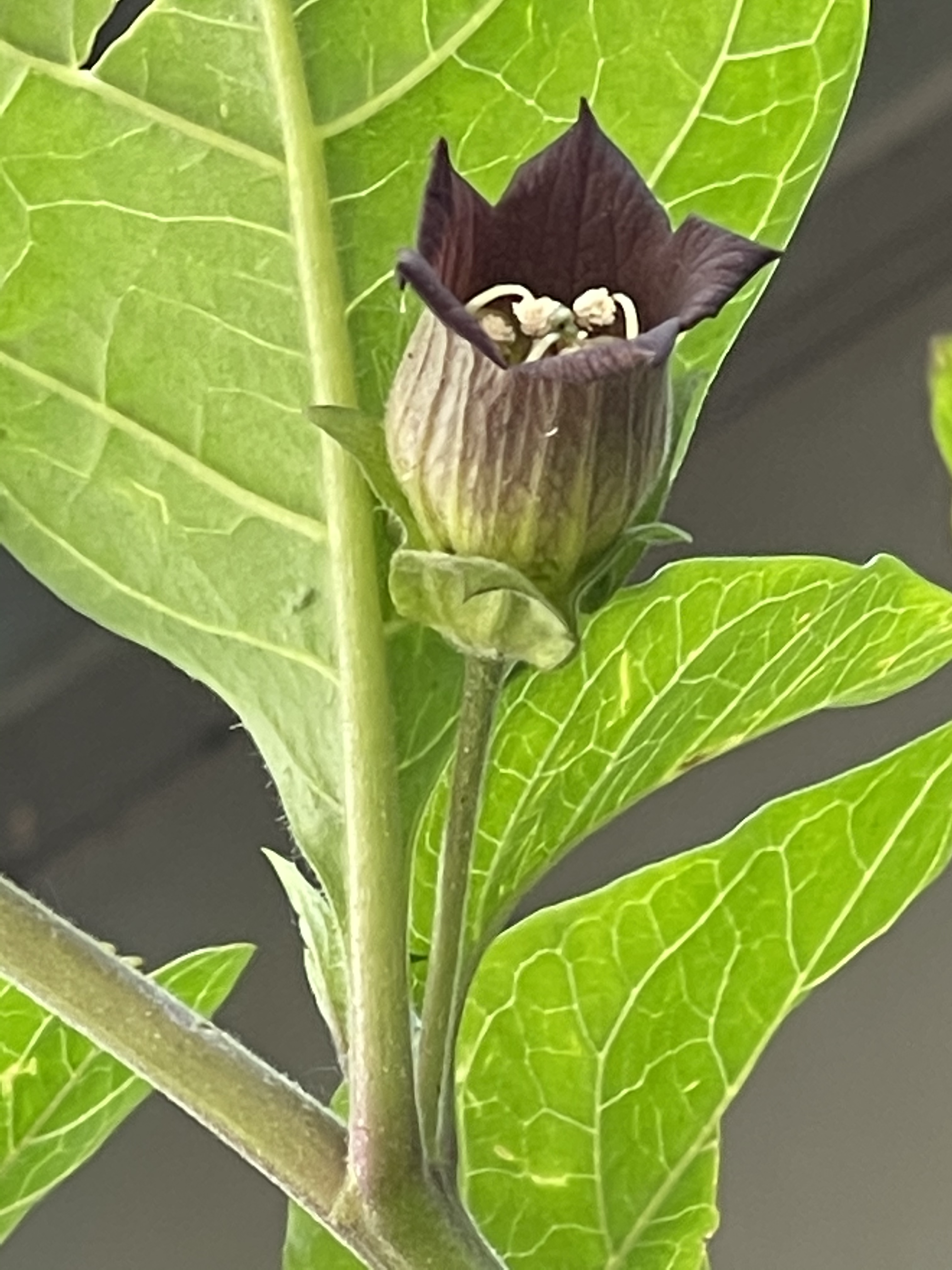
Single flower, showing long pedicel springing from leaf axil.

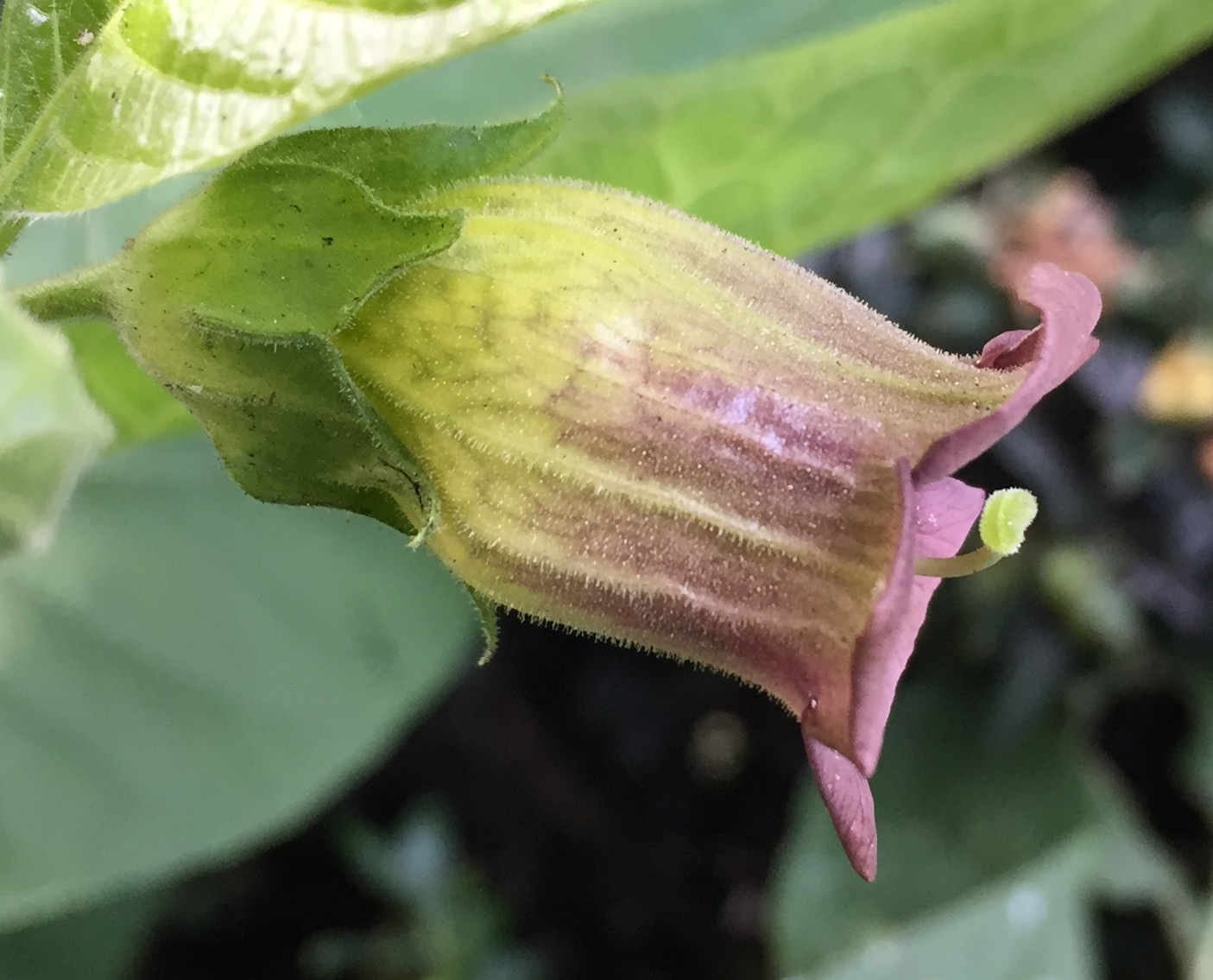
Corolla and calyx of single flower in profile.

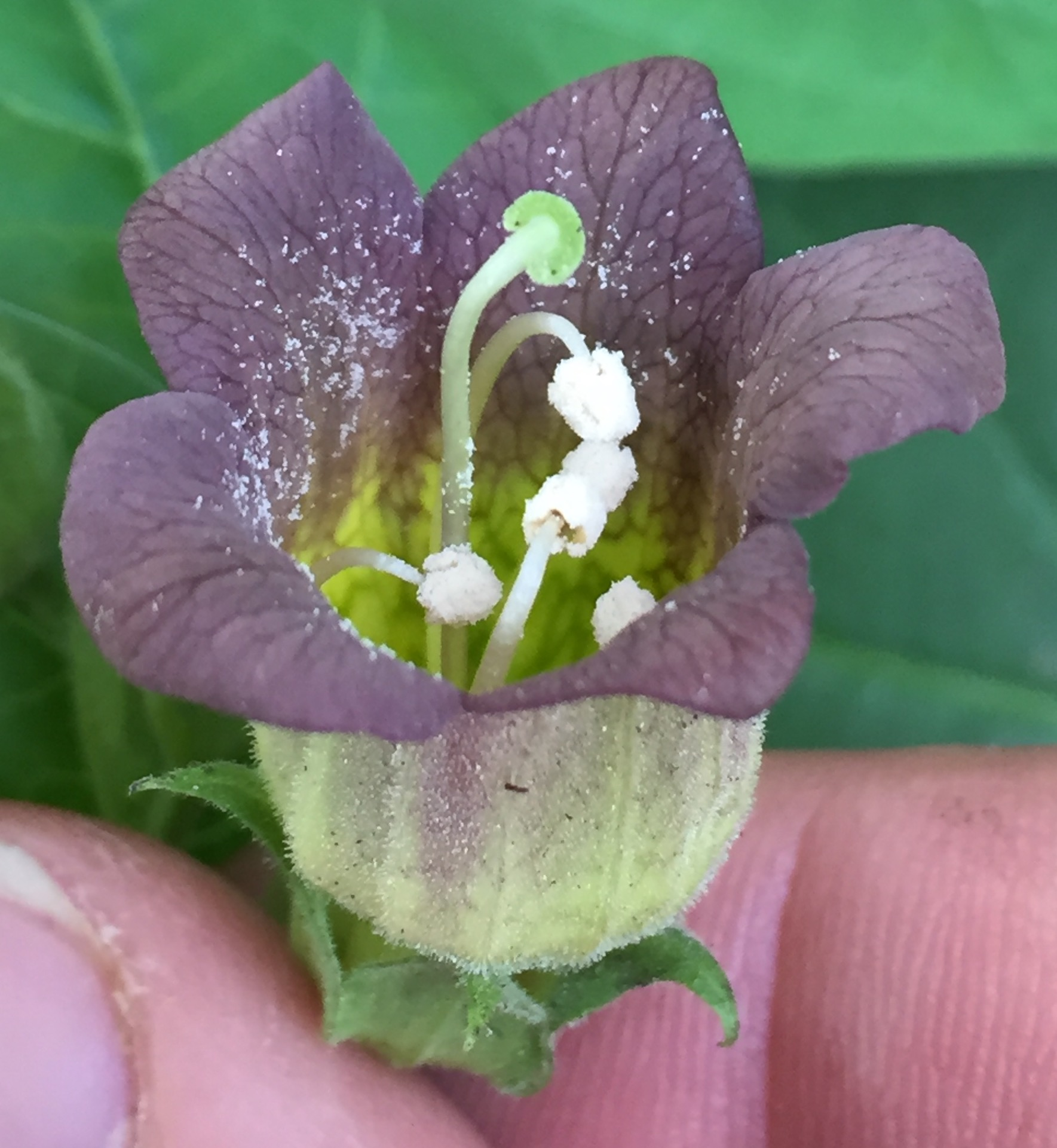
Single flower angled to show both exterior and interior.

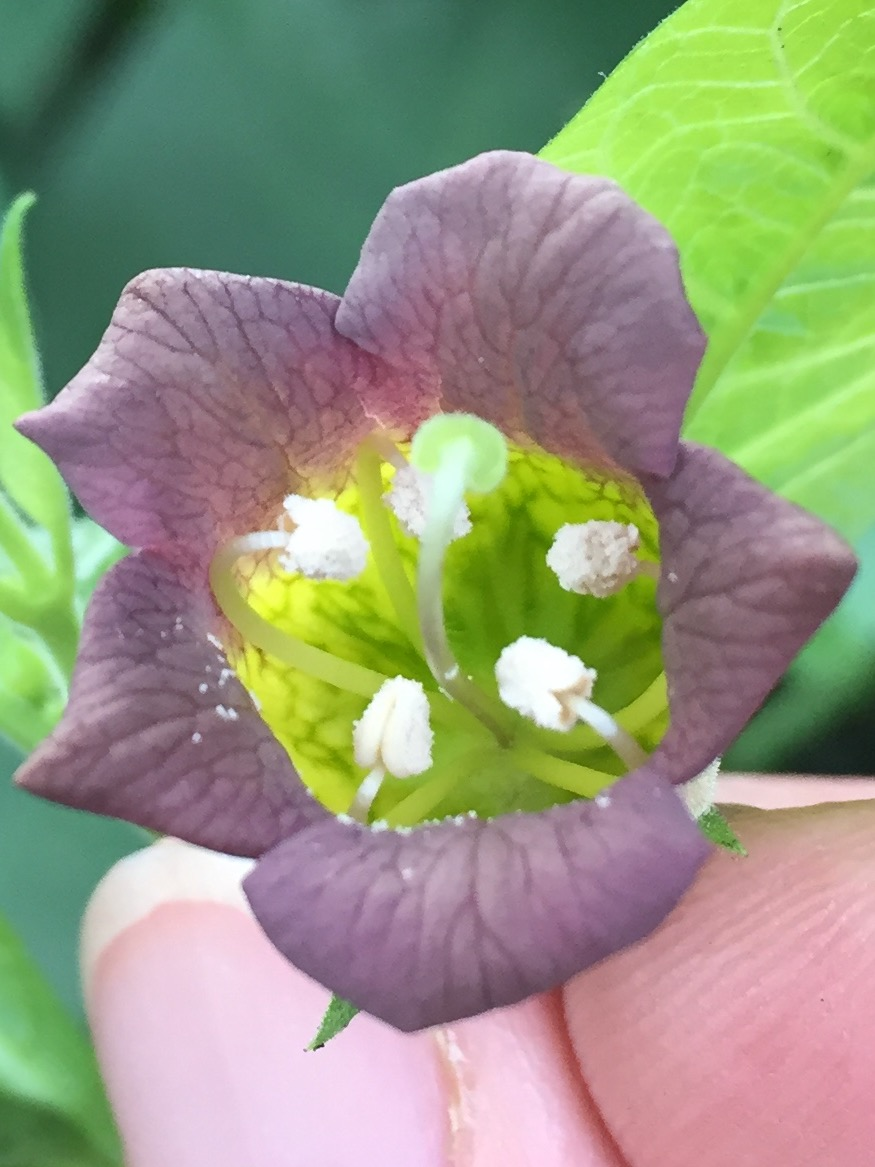
Single flower, full face, showing reticulated corolla base and insertion of (characteristically curled) stamens, and pistil.

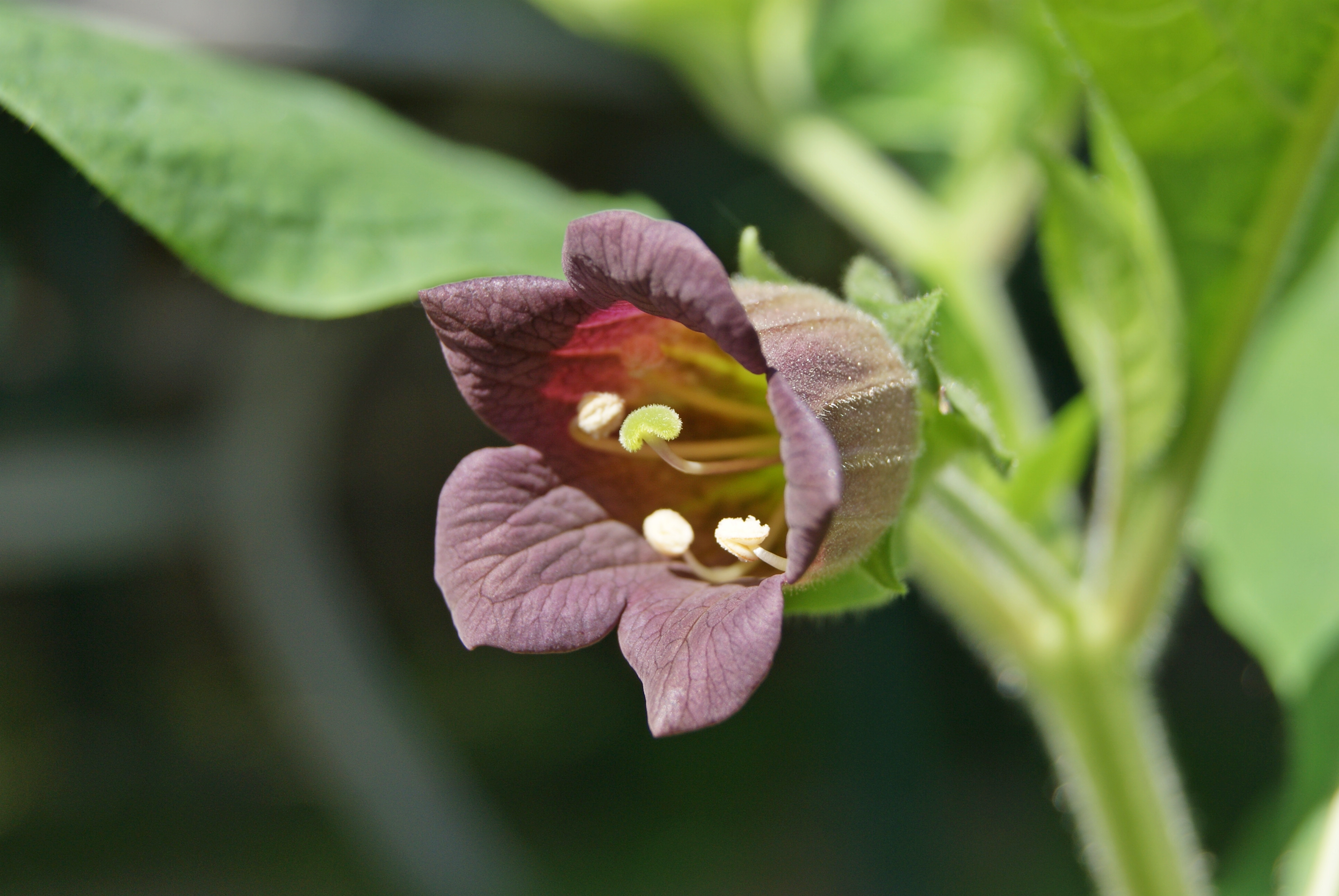
Single flower, three-quarter face, showing fine detail of puberulent stigma

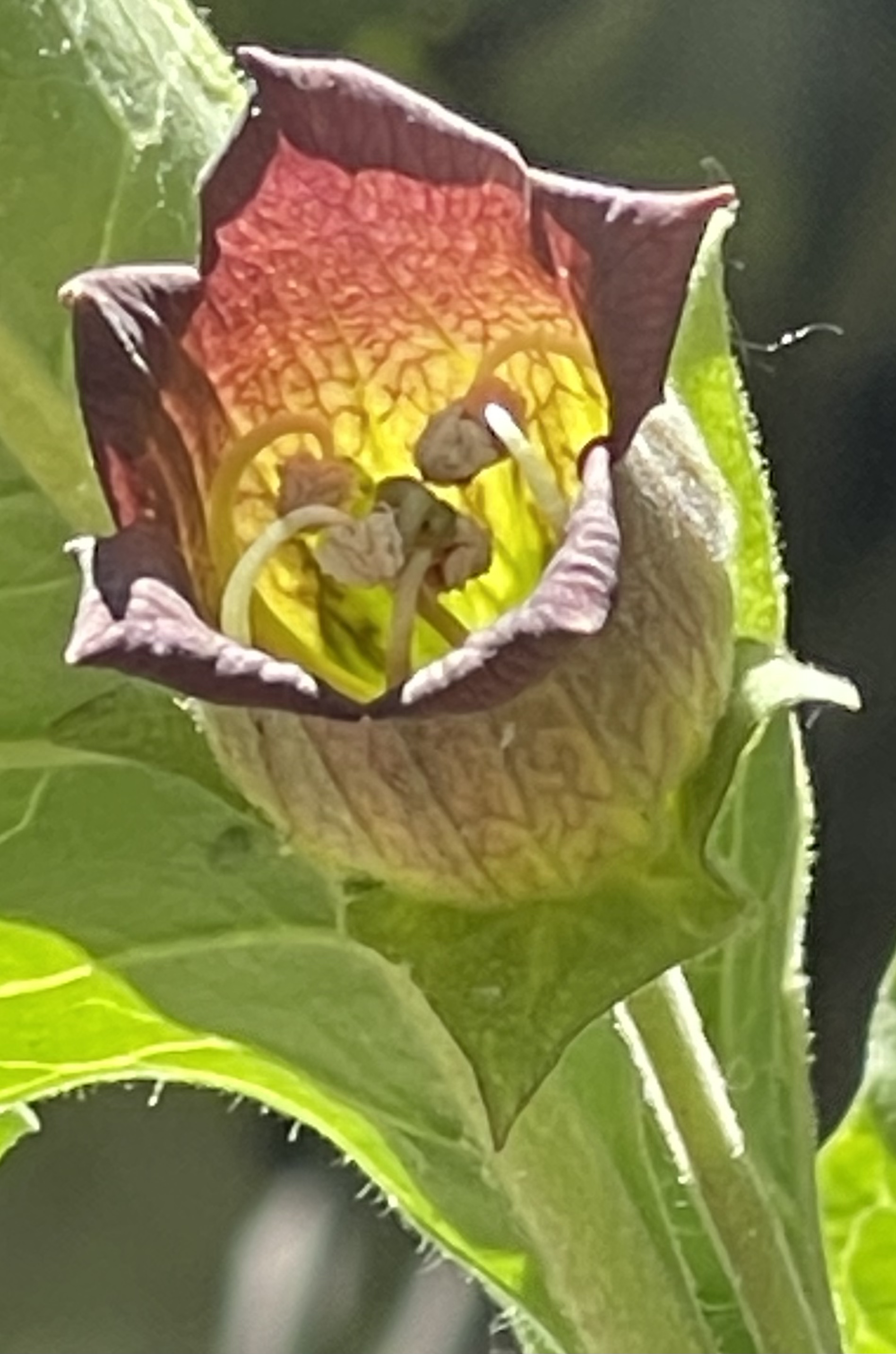
Single flower back-lit by bright sunlight to reveal purple reticulation of yellowish-green corolla tube.

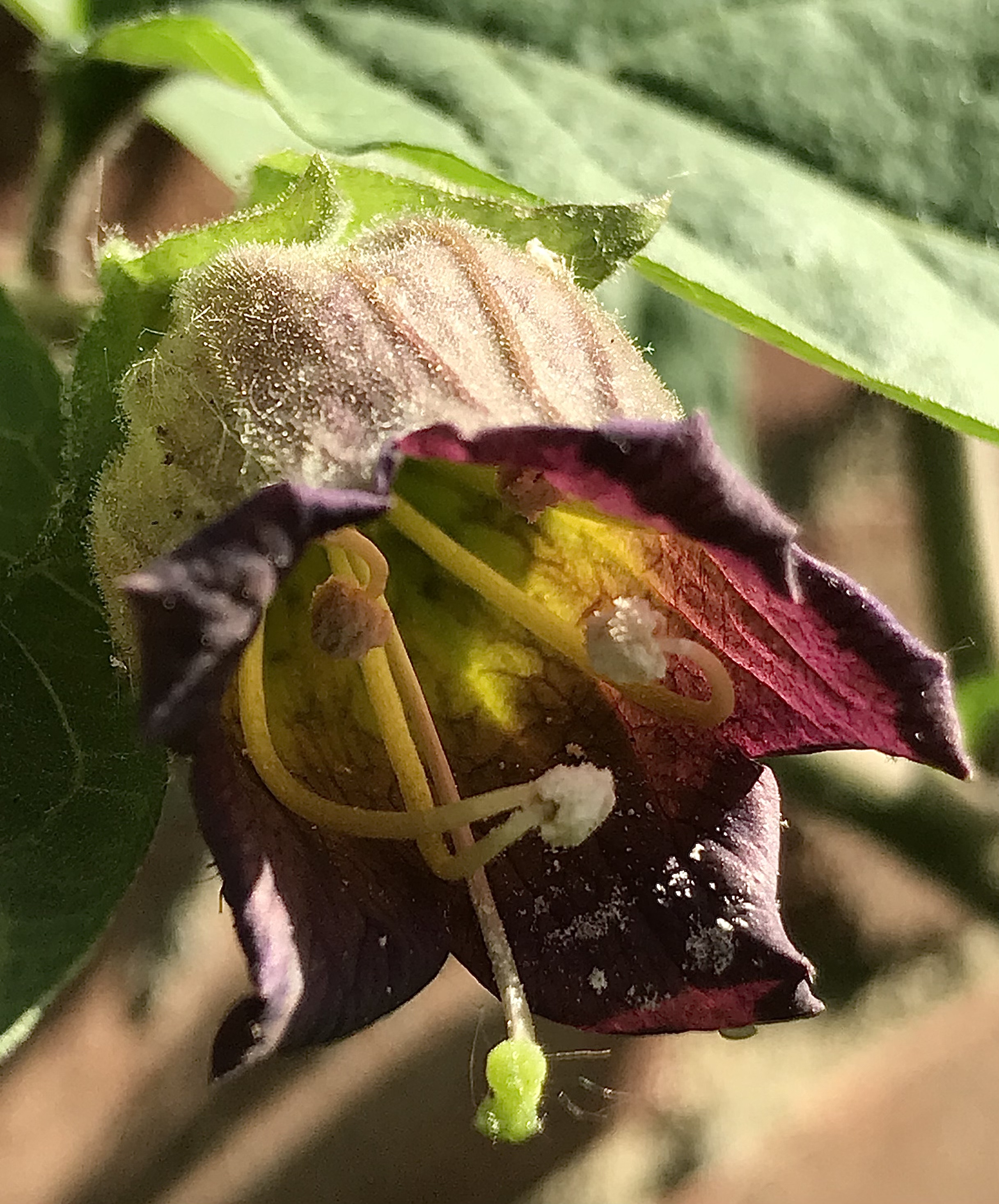
Back-lit corolla, showing contrast between pubescent, ribbed exterior and more glabrous interior

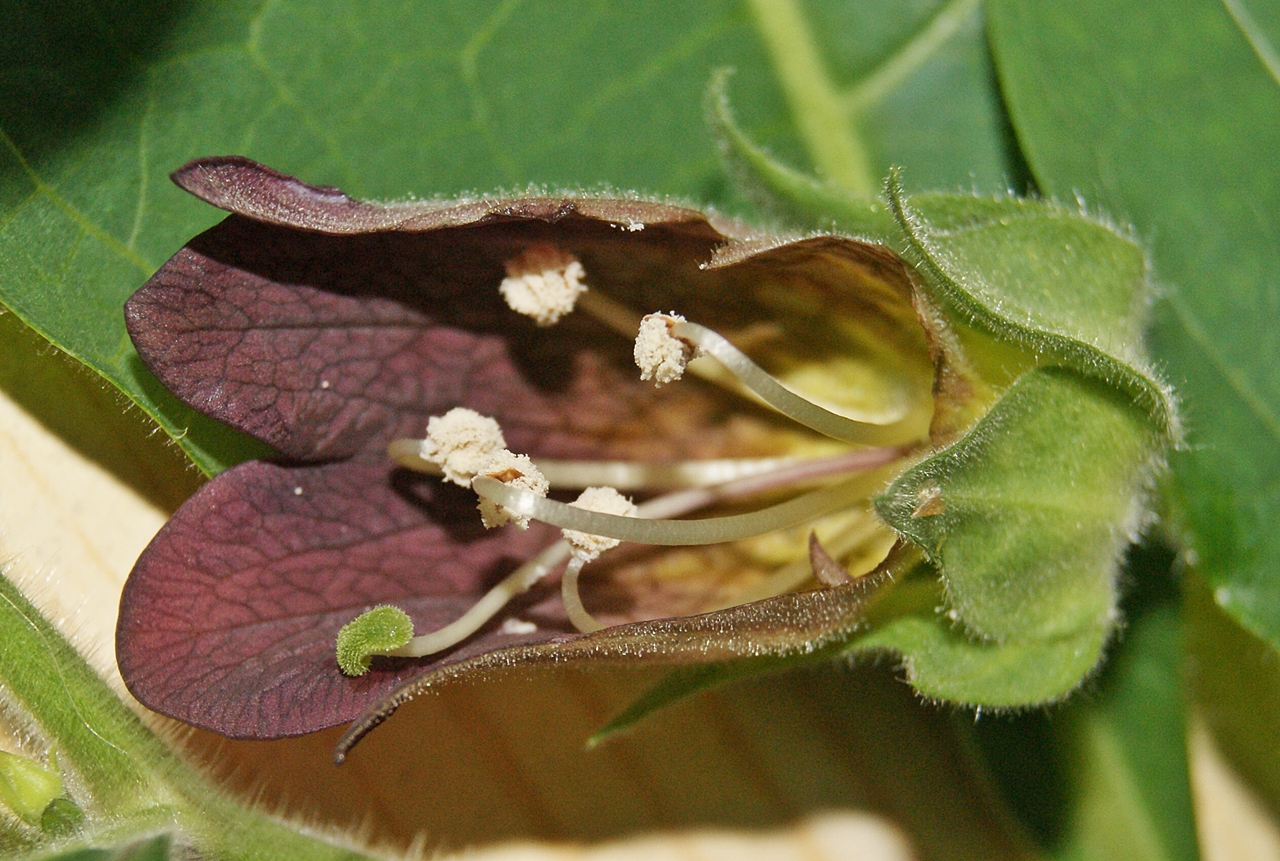
Cross-section of corolla, showing ripe anthers with flocculent, cream pollen

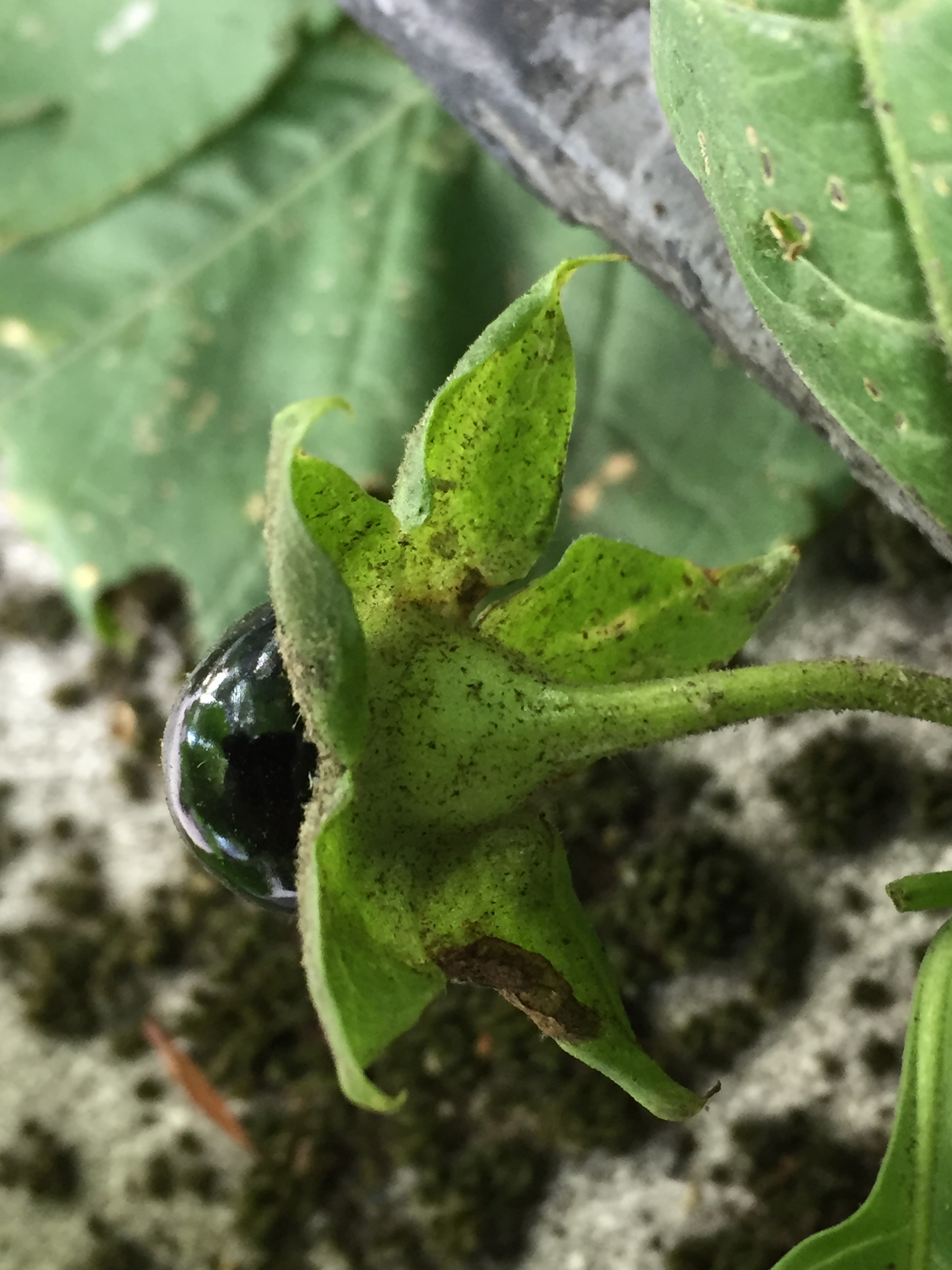
Reverse of fruiting calyx, showing concave backs of calyx lobes with dirt from air pollution coating sticky trichomes.

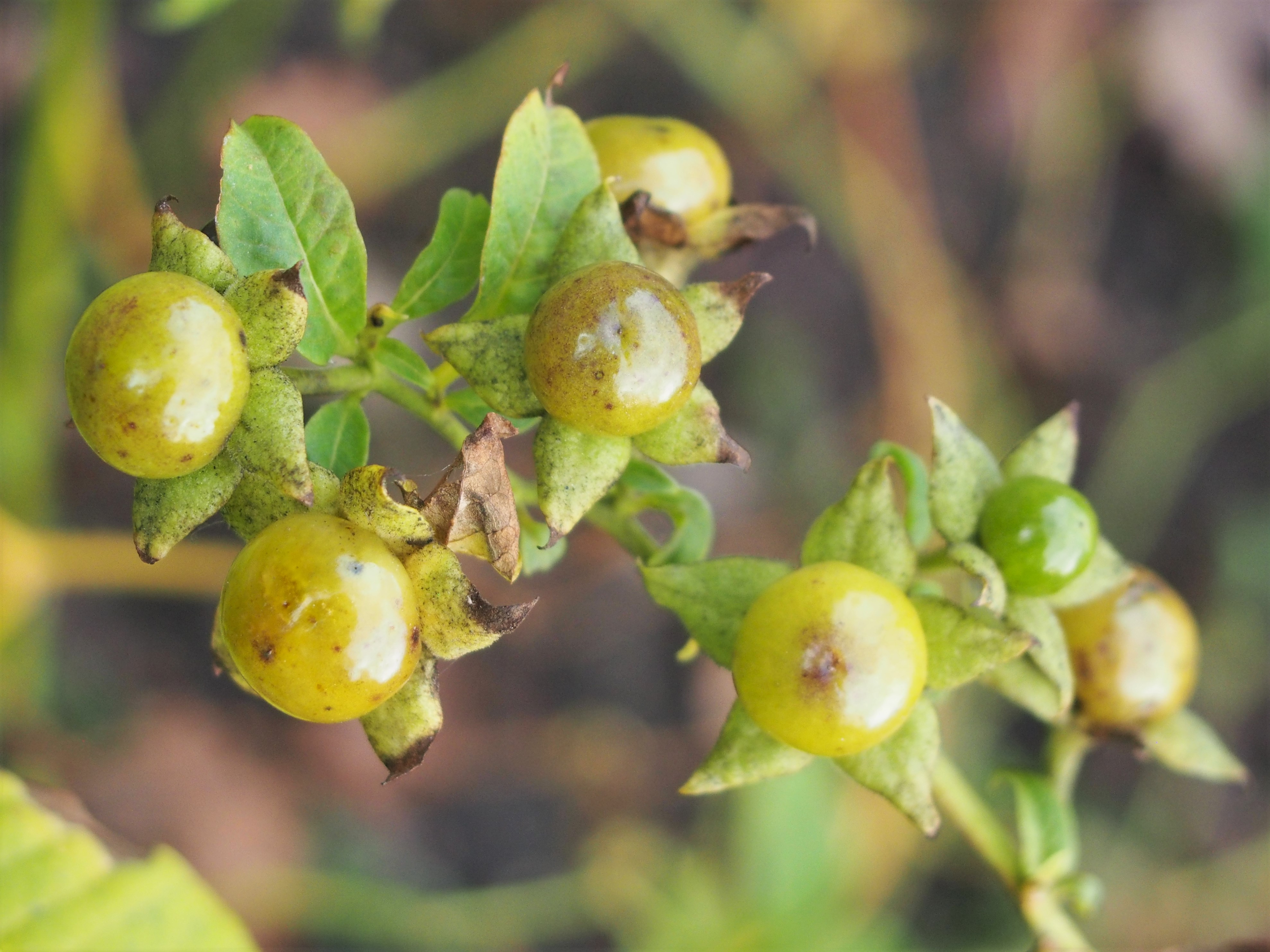
The translucent yellow berries of Atropa bella-donna lutea.

== See also ==
- List of poisonous plants
- List of plants poisonous to equines
- Donnatal, a pharmaceutical containing the active alkaloids in belladonna: scopolamine, hyoscyamine, and atropine, as a medication.
