= Consecutive controlled case series =

Type of clinical study

A consecutive controlled case series (CCCS) is a clinical study that involves aggregating multiple cases consecutively encountered wherein an experimentally controlled single-case experimental design was employed with each case. The CCCS design differs from the consecutive case series, because the latter reports on multiple cases where experimental control was not demonstrated, usually because a pre-post non experimental design was used. In contrast, a CCCS includes only cases where the intervention was evaluated using single-case experimental designs, such as a reversal design, where experimental control is demonstrated through the replication of treatment effects for each individual participant. Thus, the CCCS design has better internal validity than a consecutive case series. The CCCS design also address some concerns about the external validity or generality of findings of small-n single-case experimental design studies because it explicitly includes all cases encountered, regardless of outcome. By including all cases, any bias favoring a particular outcome in controlled for, resulting in stronger external validity relative to studies describing fewer cases that were not consecutively encountered. Moreover, when a large number of individuals are included in the series, this provides opportunities to identify variables that may predict treatment outcomes. Consecutive controlled case-series studies examining behavior analytic interventions of late have examined functional communication training. schedule thinning during functional communication training, and functional analysis and treatment using caregivers.

As with any experimental design, the CCCS design has limitations. When the sample in the series is drawn from a particular clinic, there is the potential that that sample may not be representative of the broader population because of referral bias. One additional limitation of reporting on a series of cases receiving clinical treatment (as opposed to participants enrolled in a formal research protocol) is that there tend to be variations in how the treatment is applied across participants. This is particularly the case with behavioral interventions which are individualized, and continuously evaluated, and altered based on the individual’s response. An ideal middle ground would involve the use of treatment algorithms to structure how treatment components are sequenced while still preserving the response-guided approach that is the hallmark of good clinical practice in applied behavior.

== See also ==
- Single-subject research
- Applied behavior analysis
