= Case series =

Type of medical research study

A case series (also known as a clinical series) is a type of medical research study that tracks subjects with a known exposure, such as patients who have received a similar treatment, or examines their medical records for exposure and outcome. Case series may be consecutive or non-consecutive, depending on whether all cases presenting to the reporting authors over a period were included, or only a selection. When information on more than three patients is included, the case series is considered to be a systematic investigation designed to contribute to generalizable knowledge (i.e., research), and therefore submission is required to an institutional review board (IRB). Case series usually contain demographic information about the patient(s), for example, age, gender, ethnic origin. etc.

Case series have a descriptive study design; unlike studies that employ an analytic design (e.g. cohort studies, case-control studies or randomized controlled trials), case series do not, in themselves, involve hypothesis testing to look for evidence of cause and effect (though case-only analyses are sometimes performed in genetic epidemiology to investigate the association between an exposure and a genotype). Case series are especially vulnerable to selection bias; for example, studies that report on a series of patients with a certain illness and/or a suspected linked exposure draw their patients from a particular population (such as a hospital or clinic) which may not appropriately represent the wider population.

Internal validity of case series studies is usually very low, due to the lack of a comparator group exposed to the same array of intervening variables.

For example, the effects seen may be wholly or partly due to intervening effects such as the placebo effect, Hawthorne effect, Rosenthal effect, time effects, practice effects or the natural history effect. Calculating the difference in effects between two treatment groups assumed to be exposed to a very similar array of such intervening effects allows the effects of these intervening variables to cancel out. Hence only the presence of a comparator group, which is not a feature of case-series studies, will allow a valid estimate of the true treatment effect.

== See also ==
- Case report
- Consecutive case series
- Consecutive controlled case series
