= Consecutive case series =

Type of clinical study

A consecutive case series is a type of case series clinical study that includes all eligible patients identified by the researchers during the study registration period. The patients are treated in the order in which they are identified. This type of study usually does not have a control group.

For example, in Sugrue, et al. (2016), a consecutive case series design was used to determine trends in hand surgery research.
