= Hang Lung Plaza =

Hang Lung Plaza (Chinese: 恒隆廣場) may refer to properties developed by Hang Lung Properties, all located in mainland China but none of its development named as Hang Lung Plaza in Hong Kong the headquarters located:

- Plaza 66, Shang Hai (上海恒隆廣場, literally Shanghai Hang Lung Plaza)
- Grand Gateway 66, Shang Hai (港匯恒隆廣場, literally Grand Gateway Hang Lung Plaza)
- Palace 66, Old City area, Shenyang (皇城恒隆廣場, literally Emperor City Hang Lung Plaza)
- Parc 66, Jinan (濟南恒隆廣場, literally Jinan Hang Lung Plaza)
- Forum 66, City Centre, Shenyang (市府恒隆廣場, literally City Centre Hang Lung Plaza)
- Center 66, Wuxi (無錫恒隆廣場, literally Wuxi Hang Lung Plaza)
- Riverside 66, Tianjin (天津恒隆廣場, literally Tianjin Hang Lung Plaza)
- Olympia 66, Dalian (大連恒隆廣場, literally Dalian Hang Lung Plaza)
- Spring City 66, Kunming (昆明恒隆廣場, literally Kunming Hang Lung Plaza)
- Heartland 66, Wuhan (武漢恒隆廣場, literally Wuhan Hang Lung Plaza)
- Westlake 66, Hangzhou (杭州恒隆廣場, literally Hangzhou Hang Lung Plaza)
