= Kohn Pedersen Fox =

American architectural and design firm

Kohn Pedersen Fox Associates

Practice information
- Firm type: Architecture, interior design, sustainable design, urban design, planning
- Founded: New York City, New York, U.S. 1976; 50 years ago
- No. of employees: 600+
- Location: 11 West 42nd Street, New York City, New York, U.S. (Additional offices in London, Shanghai, Shenzhen, Hong Kong, Seoul, San Francisco, Singapore, Berlin)

Website
- www.kpf.com

Kohn Pedersen Fox Associates (KPF) is an American architectural firm based in New York City that provides architecture, interior, programming and master planning services. They engineer different projects including civic and cultural spaces, commercial office buildings, transportation facilities, residential and hospitality developments, educational and institutional facilities, and mixed-use commercial developments.

== History ==
=== Beginnings in the United States (1976–1980s) ===
KPF was founded in 1976 by A. Eugene Kohn, William Pedersen, and Sheldon Fox, all of whom coordinated their departure from John Carl Warnecke & Associates, among the largest architectural firms in the country. Shortly thereafter, the American Broadcasting Company (ABC) chose KPF to redevelop a former armory building on Manhattan's West Side to house TV studios and offices. This led to 14 more projects for ABC over the next 11 years, as well as commissions from major corporations across the country, including AT&T and Hercules Incorporated. By the mid-1980s, KPF had nearly 250 architects working on projects in cities throughout the United States. In 1985, John Burgee (of rival architecture firm John Burgee Architects) called KPF "The best commercial firm now practicing in the U.S." KPF's design for 333 Wacker Drive in Chicago (1983), which was awarded the AIA National Honor Award in 1984, made the firm nationally famous. It remains a Chicago landmark, and was voted "Favorite Building" by the readers of the Chicago Tribune in both 1995 and 1997. In 1986, KPF's Procter & Gamble Headquarters in Cincinnati, which included an open plan interior design by Patricia Conway, was recognized for its innovative design with the AIA National Honor Award. After its success with these projects, KPF was selected to design the IBM World Headquarters in Armonk, New York (1997), the Chicago Title and Trust Building in Chicago (1992), and the Federal Reserve Bank of Dallas (1993).

In the 1990s, KPF also took on a larger number of government and civic projects, including the Foley Square U.S. Courthouse in New York (1995), the Mark O. Hatfield U.S. Courthouse in Portland, Oregon (1996), the U.S. Courthouse of Minneapolis (1996), the Buffalo Niagara International Airport (1993) and the multiple award-winning redevelopment of The World Bank Headquarters in Washington, D.C. (1996).

KPF's winning entry in the international competition for the World Bank Headquarters, which drew 76 entrants from 26 countries, was the only entry that included the retention of existing structures.

=== Expansion to Europe (1980s–1990s) ===
In the 1980s and 1990s, KPF transformed from an American firm known for its corporate designs into an international firm with institutional, government, and transportation commissions in addition to corporate work.

KPF completed the design for two blocks of the large-scale Canary Wharf redevelopment (1987) and the Goldman Sachs Headquarters on Fleet Street (1987–1991). KPF has been selected for projects in the Canary Wharf area through to the present day, including the Clifford Chance Tower (2002) to KPMG's European Headquarters (2009). KPF's subsequent work in the United Kingdom includes Thames Court in London (1998), the Rothermere American Institute at Oxford University (2001) and the master plan for the London School of Economics (2002). KPF's design for the award-winning Westendstraße 1 in Frankfurt (1992), an early example of mixed-use design, further increased the firm's international prominence and solidified the firm's reputation as a progressive global practice. KPF was chosen for subsequent projects throughout Europe, including Provinciehuis in The Hague (1998), Danube House in River City, Prague (2003), the expansion and renovation of the World Trade Center in Amsterdam (2004) and the Endesa Headquarters in Madrid (2003).

=== Work in Asia and internationally (1990s–2009) ===
KPF's introduction to the Asian market began with the 4,500,000 sq ft (420,000 m^{2}) Japan Railways Central Towers project in Nagoya (1999). Within 10 years, KPF had projects in Japan, Korea, Indonesia, Thailand, Hong Kong, Taiwan and mainland China. Completed KPF projects in Asia include Plaza 66 on Shanghai's Nanjing Xi Lu (2001), Roppongi Hills in Tokyo (2003), Continental Engineering Corporation Tower in Taipei (2003), the Rodin Pavilion in Seoul (2003), the Merrill Lynch Japan Head Office in Tokyo (2004), Shr-Hwa International Tower in Taichung (2004), and the Shanghai World Financial Center (2008), which was named the "Best Tall Building Overall" by the Council on Tall Buildings and the Urban Habitat in 2008. KPF worked with renowned structural engineers, Leslie E. Robertson Associates, to maximize the tower's floor plate and material efficiency by perfecting its tapered form. In addition to this work in Asia, KPF has completed projects in: the Middle East, including the Abu Dhabi Investment Authority Headquarters (2007) and the Marina Towers in Beirut (2008); South America including Ventura Corporate Towers in Rio de Janeiro (2008) and Infinity Tower in São Paulo (2012); Australia, including Chifley Tower in Sydney (1992); and has also worked on several projects in Africa.

=== Expanded national and global presence (2010–present) ===
Four decades after its founding, KPF has refined particular expertise in the area of office design, supertall structures, and large-scale, urban, mixed use developments.

In November 2018, the firm announced the opening of new offices in San Francisco, Berlin, and Singapore to support current projects, new commissions, and imminent endeavors in those regions.

The firm's high-profile projects include One Vanderbilt, a new supertall office tower in Midtown Manhattan located next to Grand Central Terminal and providing direct access to the station; and the master plan for Hudson Yards, the largest private real estate development in U.S. history, which mixes residences with offices, hotels and retail, and street life. KPF also designed buildings 10 Hudson Yards, 20 Hudson Yards, 30 Hudson Yards, and 55 Hudson Yards, which together offer office, retail, and hospitality space within the development.

Also in New York, KPF is leading the redevelopment of New York City Housing Authority's (NYCHA) Red Hook Houses, which suffered severe flooding and wind damage during Superstorm Sandy in 2012. The largest public housing development in Brooklyn, Red Hook Houses accommodates over 6,000 people across 28 buildings.

Outside of the United States, KPF has been contributing to the regeneration and conservation of the Covent Garden Estate in the roles of both master planner and architect for a collection of buildings. Also in London, the firm designed 52 Lime Street, known as The Scalpel.

Construction of "The Spiral Tower" in Tel Aviv, Israel, began in 2018. Designed by KPF and Israeli architect Moshe Tzur, the 91-story, 350-meter-tall skyscraper is set for completion in 2028 and is slated to become the tallest building in Israel.

== Recent work ==
KPF's projects include civic and cultural spaces, commercial office buildings, transportation facilities, residential and hospitality developments, educational and institutional facilities, and mixed-use commercial developments.

In Boston, KPF is currently designing two waterfront projects: Channelside, three buildings with housing, office, labs, and retail on the Fort Point Waterfront and The Pinnacle at Central Wharf, a 600-foot residential, office, and retail tower downtown. KPF is also designing the University of Michigan's Detroit Center for Innovation, 601 West Pender in Vancouver, 40 Charter Street in London, 81 Newgate Street in London, and The Bermondsey Project in south London, which will create around 1,548 homes on the site. KPF is also planning and designing the new Hong Kong University of Science and Technology "sustainable, smart campus" in Guangzhou.

=== Recent projects ===
- CUNY Advanced Science Research Centers in New York City (2015)
- 52 Lime Street in London (2018)

=== Gallery ===
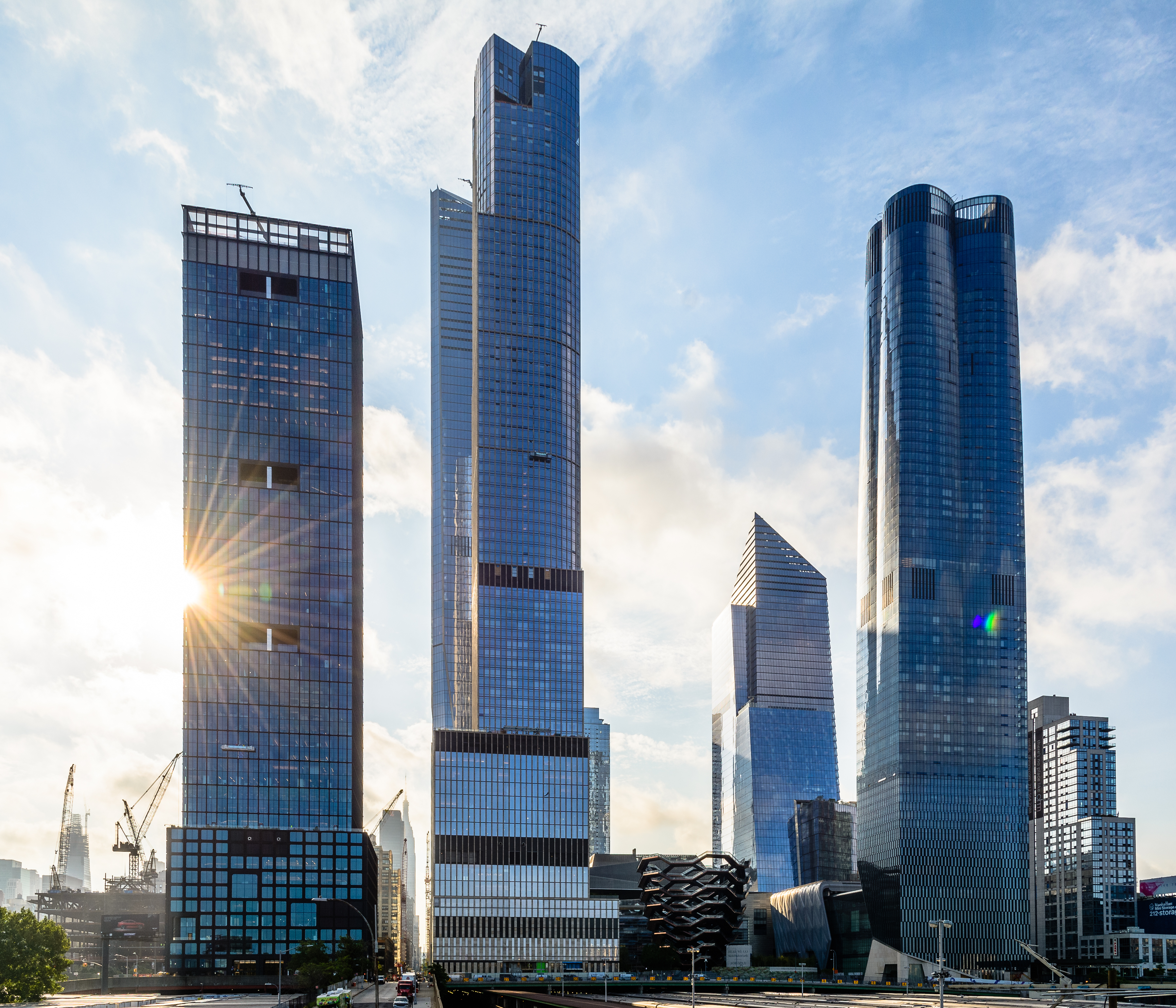
Hudson Yards, New York, NY, USA

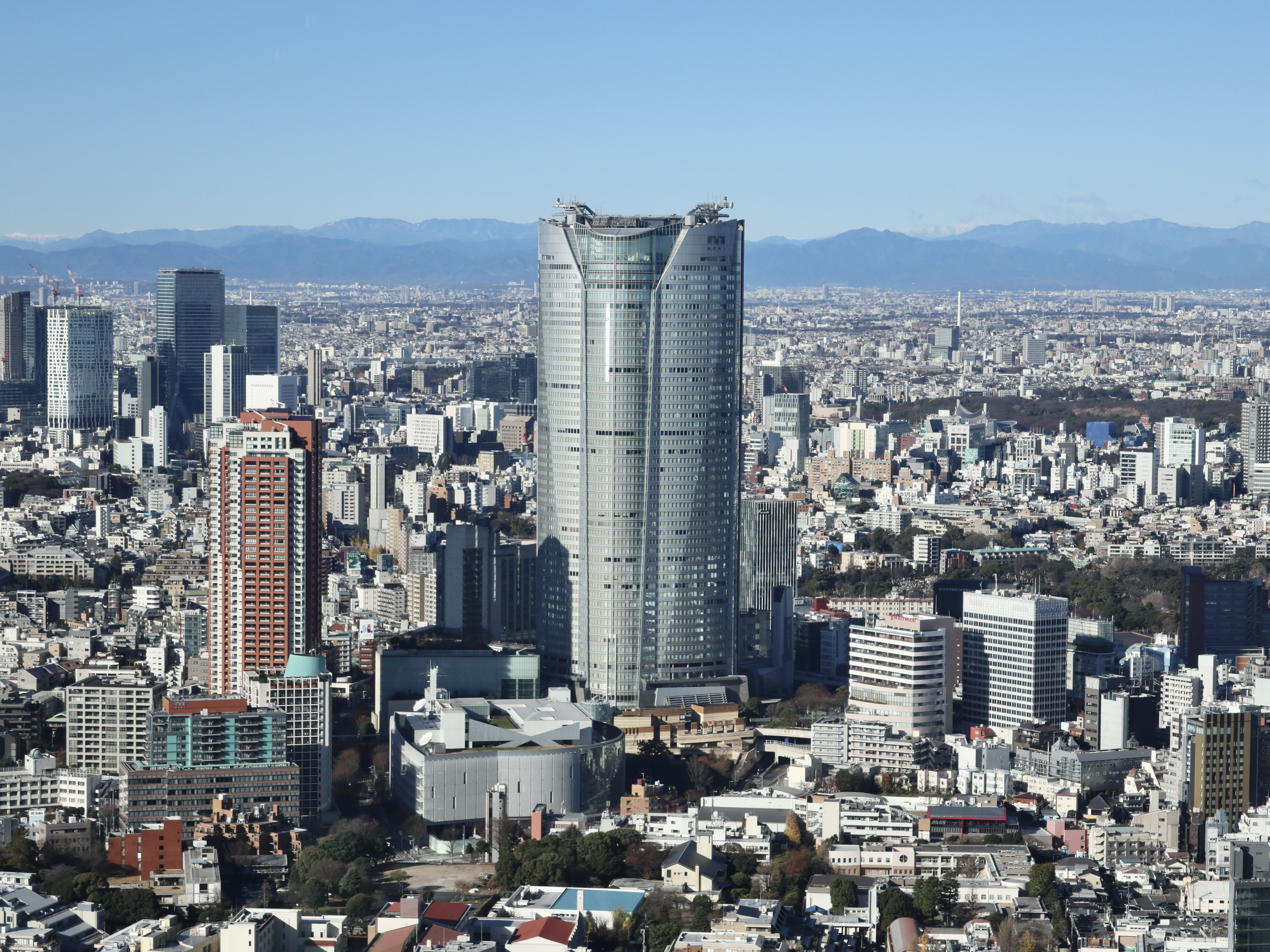
Roppongi Hills, Tokyo, Japan

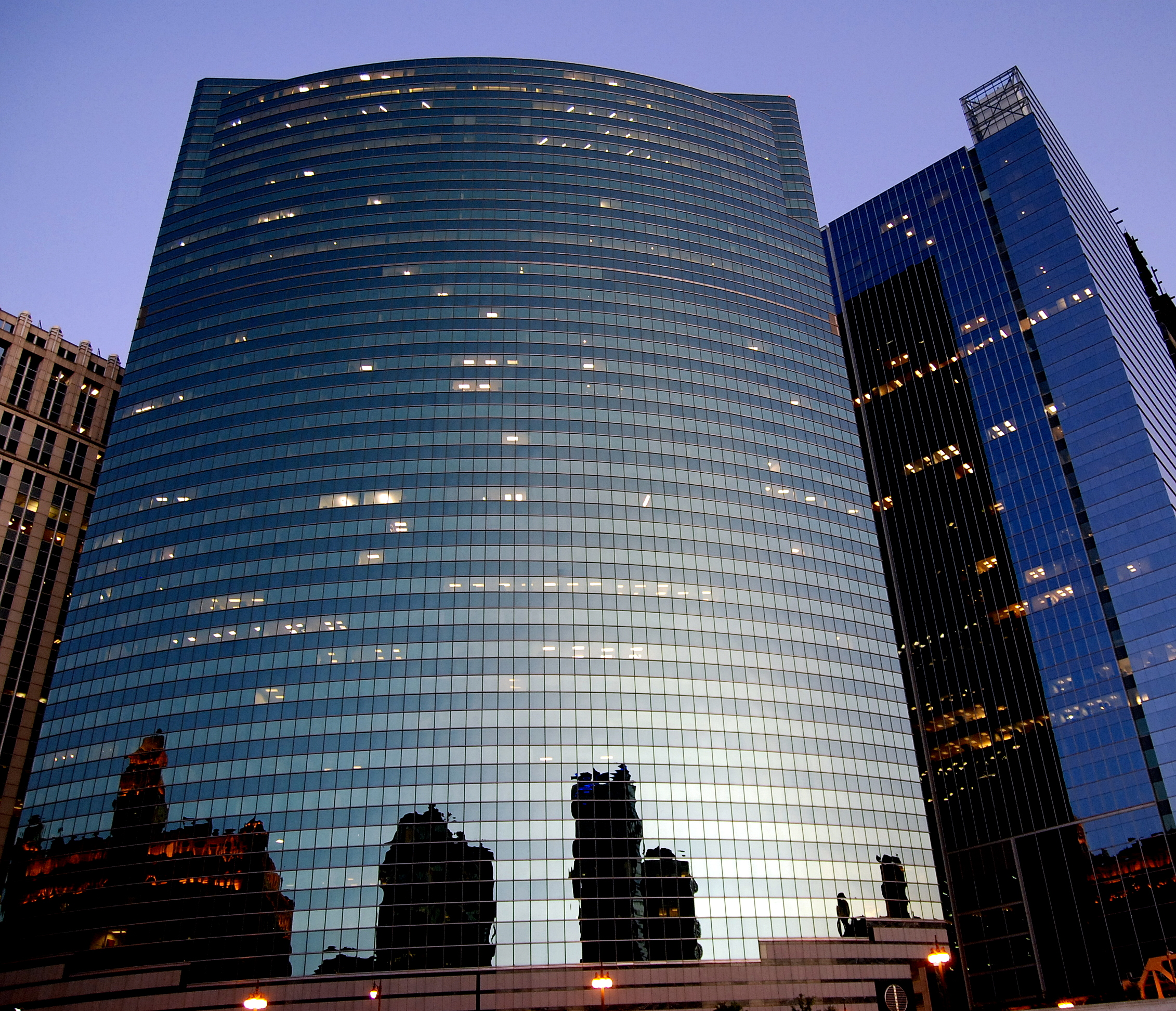
333 West Wacker Drive, Chicago, IL, USA

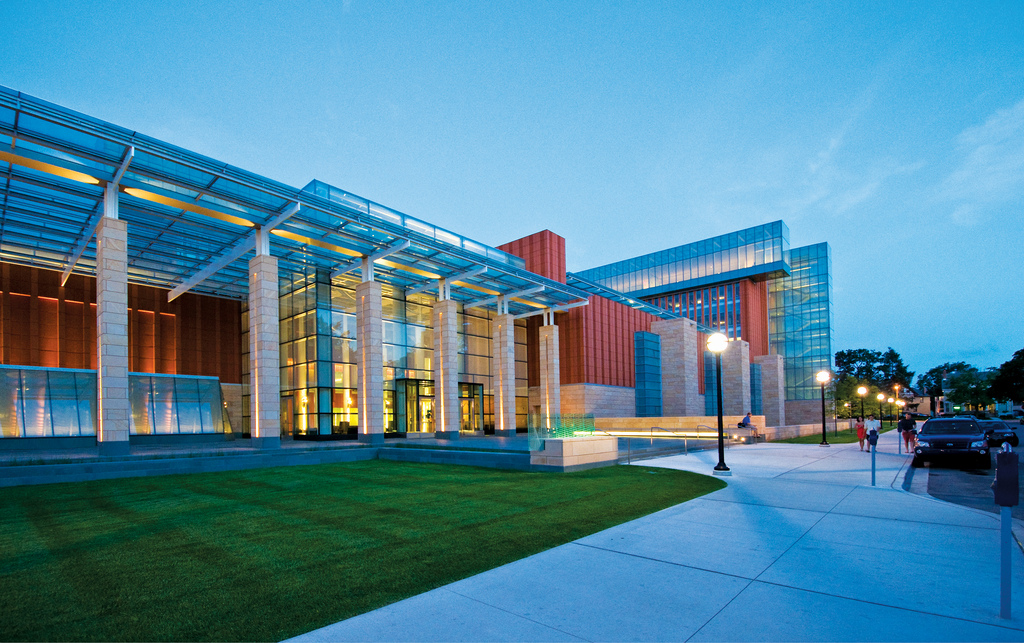
Ross School of Business, University of Michigan, Ann Arbor, MI, USA

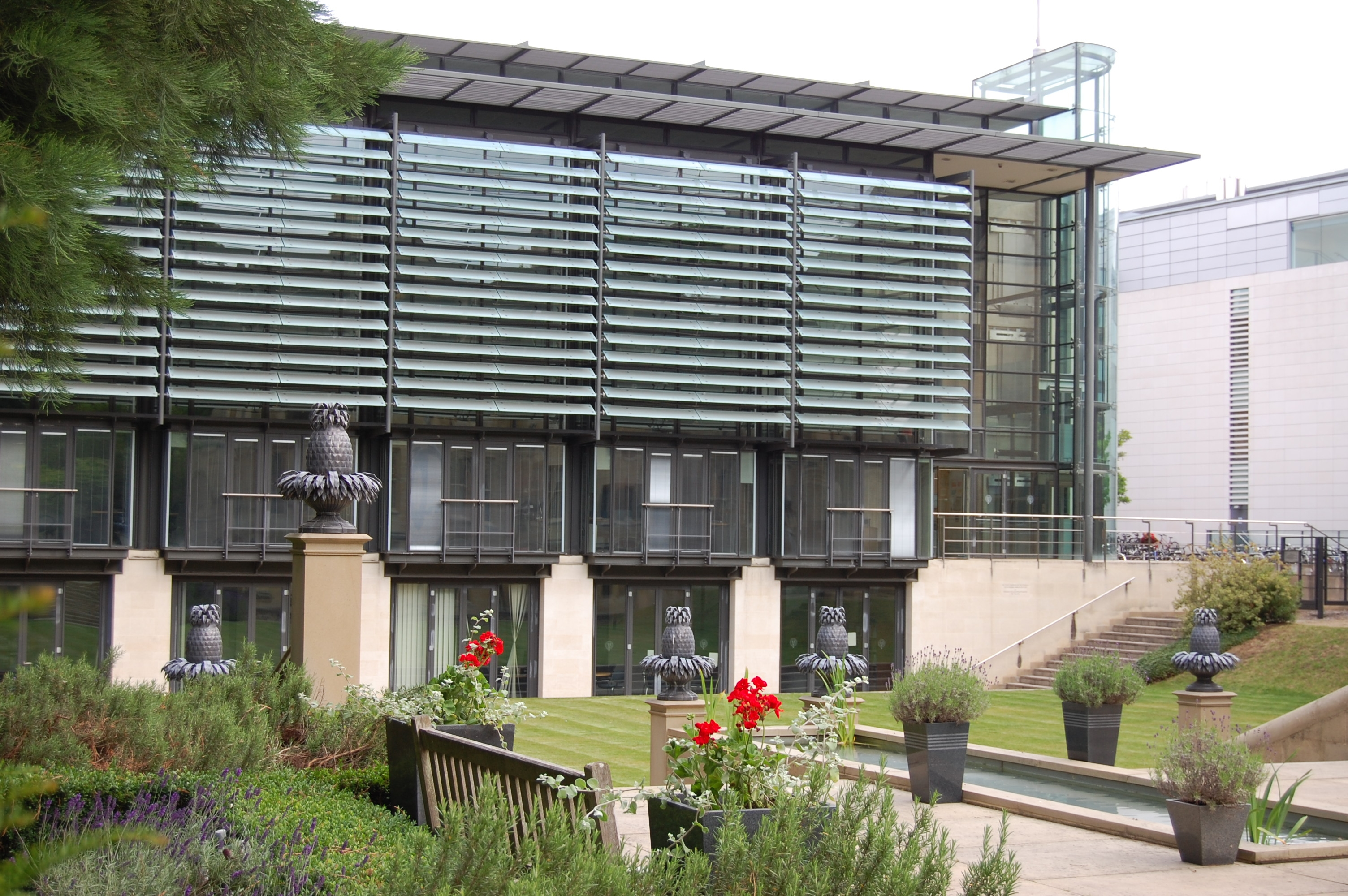
Rothermere American Institute, University of Oxford, Oxford, UK

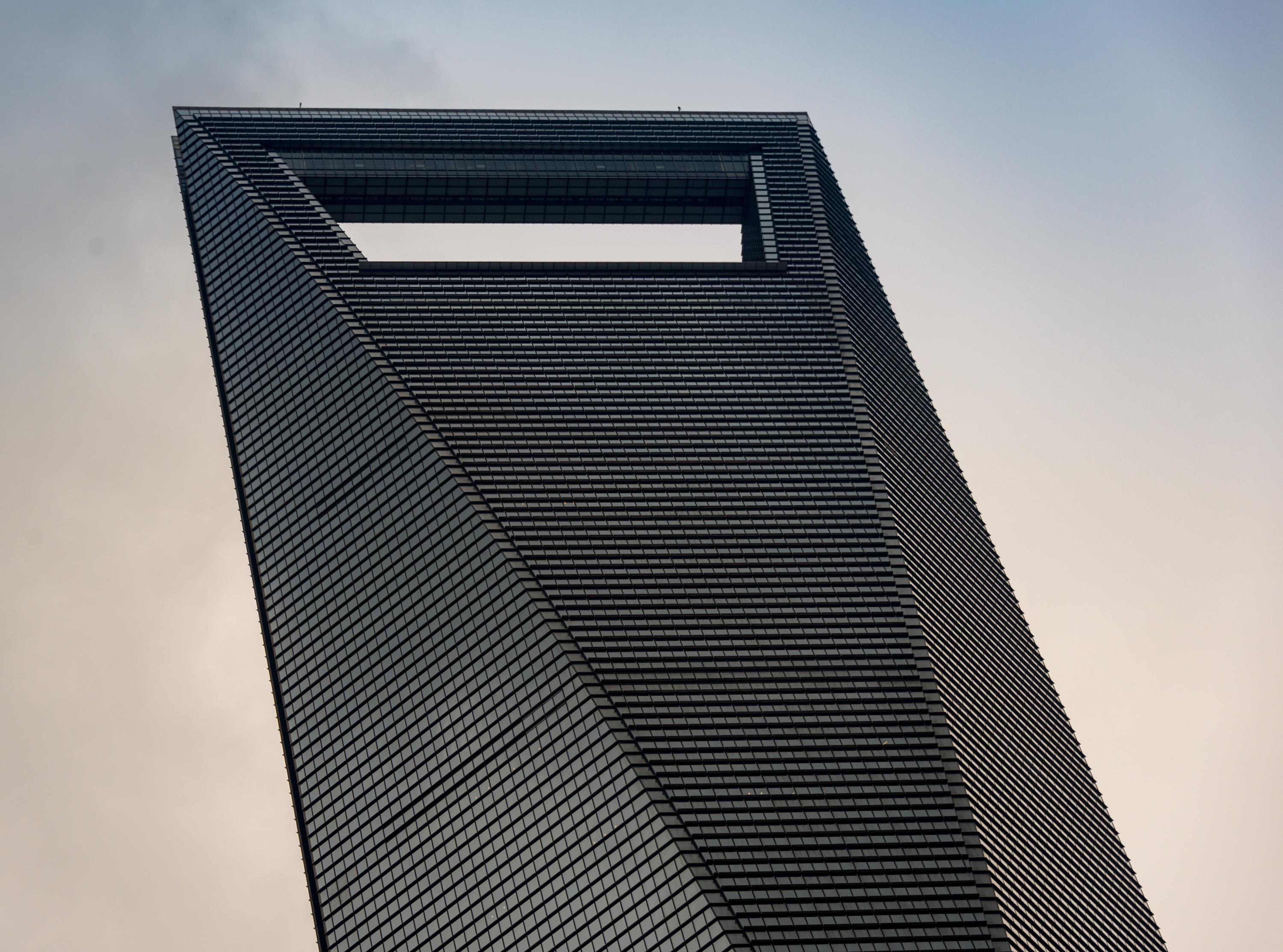
Shanghai World Financial Center, Shanghai, China

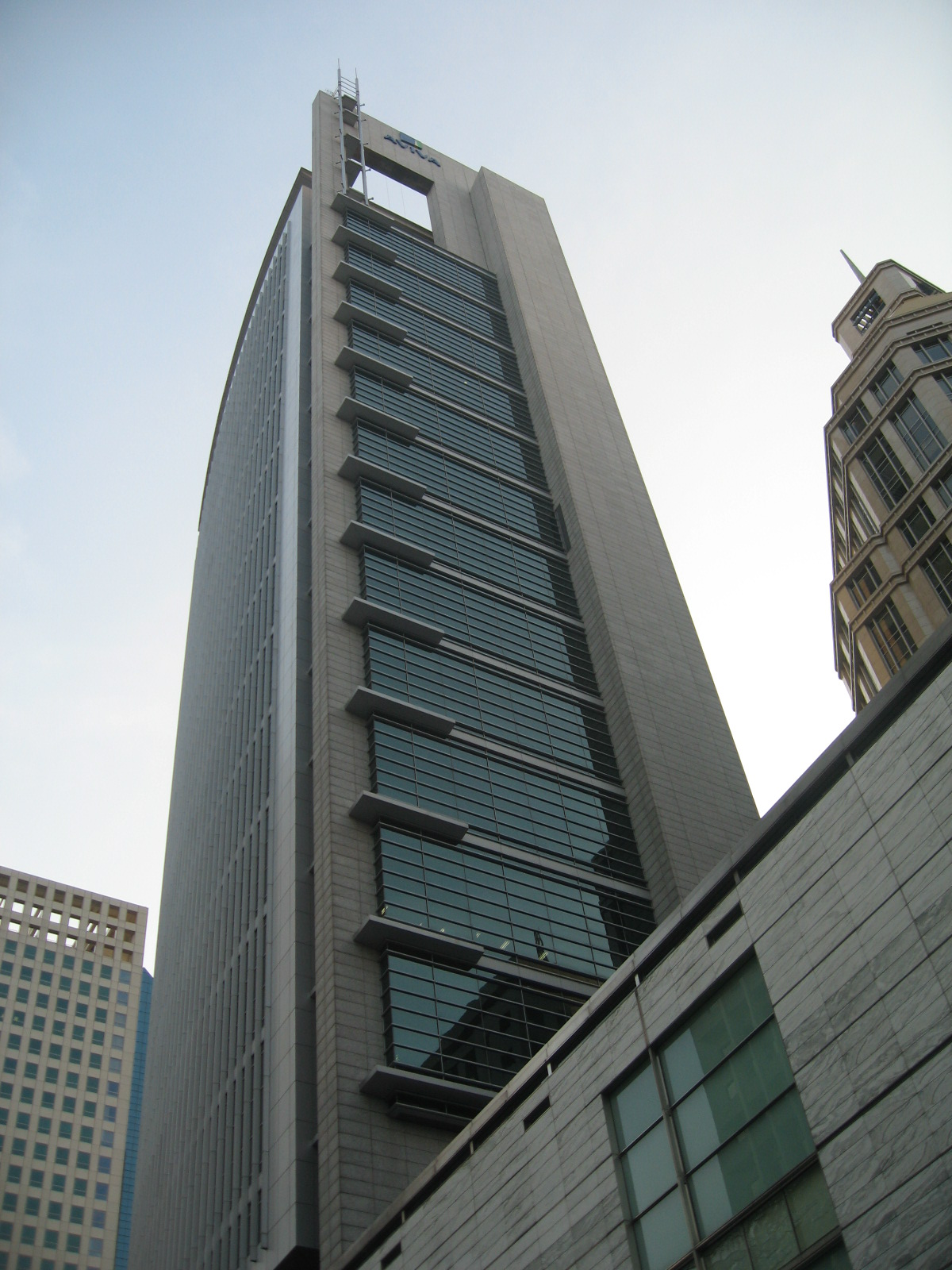
SGX Centre, Singapore

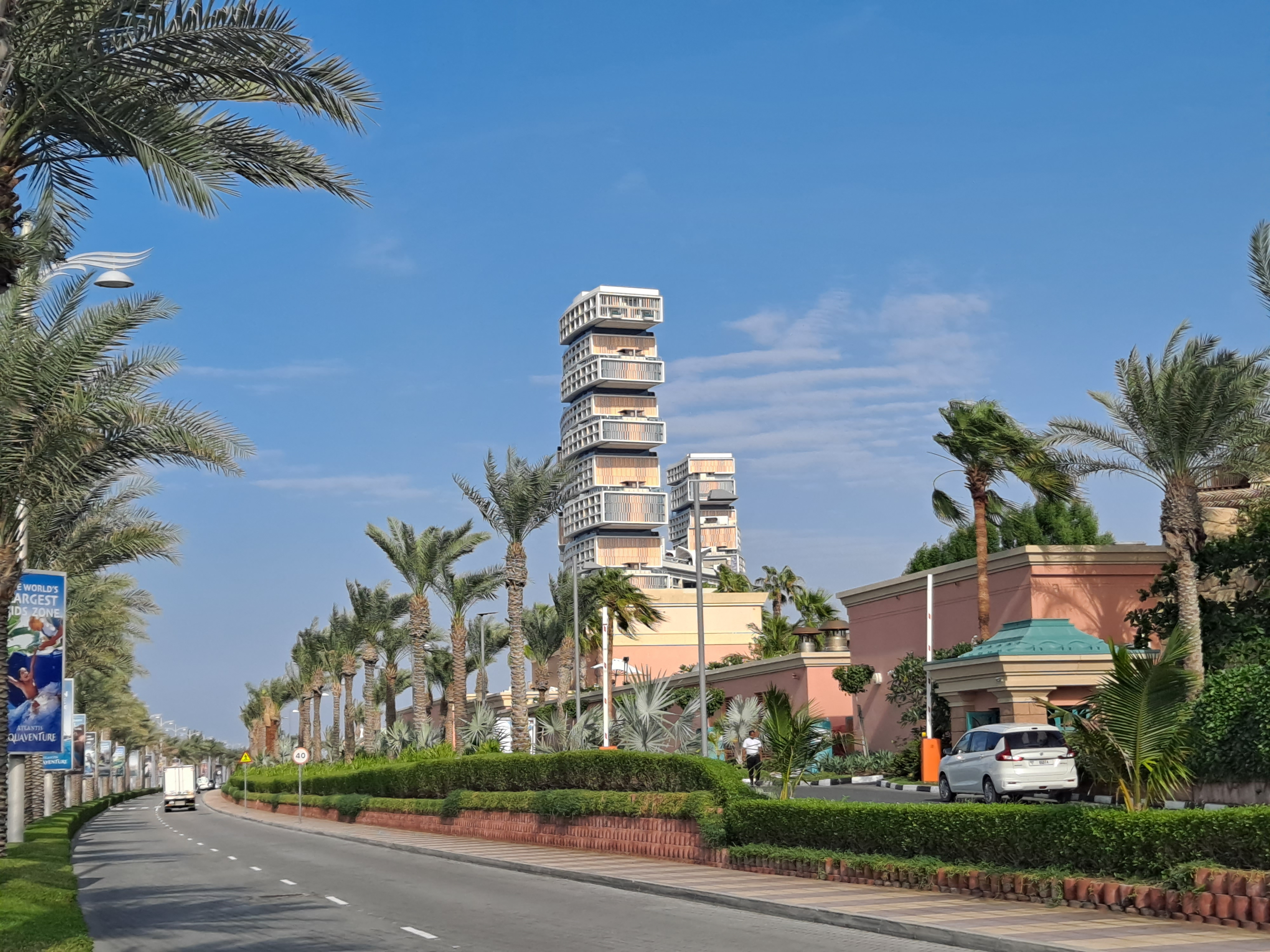
Atlantis The Royal, Dubai, United Arab Emirates

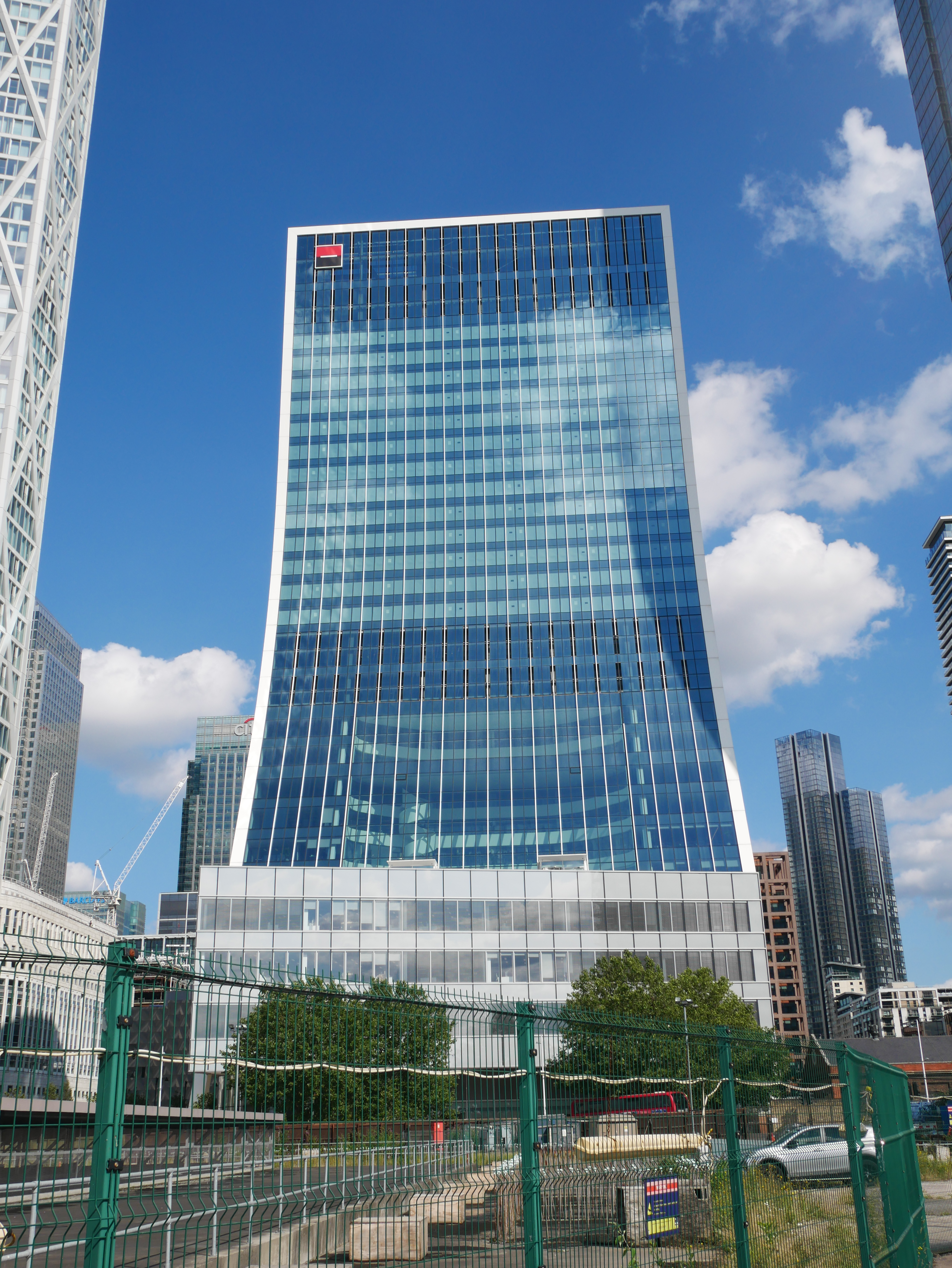
One and Five Bank Street, London, UK

The Spiral Tower (Tel Aviv, Israel)

== Achievements ==
KPF has been involved in the design of some of the world's tallest buildings including: Ping-An Financial Centre in Shenzhen, China at 600 m / 1,969 ft.; the Lotte World Tower in Seoul, South Korea at 555 m / 1,820 ft.; the CTF Finance Center in Guangzhou, China at 530 m / 1,739 ft.; the CITIC Tower in Beijing, China at 528 m / 1,732 ft; and Shanghai World Financial Center in Shanghai, China at 492 m / 1,614 ft.

KPF takes on a large number of restoration and renovation projects. Examples of this work include The World Bank Headquarters, Unilever House, and The Landmark in Hong Kong. KPF has been recognized for workplace collaboration. KPF's intranet "Architectural Forum" has been described in Architectural Record as an example of "a resource that contributes to a learning environment through mentoring supporting teams and individuals with new ideas, and sharing best practices".

== Tallest buildings ==
This list ranks buildings which stand over 750 ft (230 m) tall that are designed by Kohn Pedersen Fox. Spires and other architectural details are included in the height of a building, however, antennas are excluded.

In order for a building to be in this list, the building itself must have been designed or partially designed by Kohn Pedersen Fox. Due to this, buildings such as 15 Hudson Yards, 35 Hudson Yards, 50 Hudson Yards, and many others are not included in this list.

Building has been architecturally topped out

Rank	Name	Image	City	Height	Floors	Year	Purpose	Notes
1	Ping An Finance Center	PING_AN_FINANCE_CENTER,_SHENZHEN_(9)	Flag_of_the_People's_Republic_of_China Shenzhen, China	1,965 ft (599 m)	115	2017	Office	Tallest building designed by Kohn Pederson Fox. Tallest building in Shenzhen. 5th-tallest building in the world.
2	Lotte World Tower		Flag_of_South_Korea Seoul, South Korea	1,821 ft (555 m)	123	2017	Office, Residential, Hotel	
3	Guangzhou CTF Finance Centre		Flag_of_the_People's_Republic_of_China Guangzhou, China	1,739 ft (530 m)	111	2016	Office, Residential, Hotel	
4	China Zun	CITIC_Tower_2021	Flag_of_the_People's_Republic_of_China Beijing, China	1,731 ft (528 m)	109	2018	Office	Tallest building to have ever been hit by a plane, surpassing the original World Trade Center in New York.
5	Shanghai World Financial Center		Flag_of_the_People's_Republic_of_China Shanghai, China	1,614 ft (492 m)	101	2008	Office, Hotel	
6	International Commerce Centre	Hong_Kong_International_Commerce_Centre;_November_2014	Flag_of_Hong_Kong Hong Kong, China	1,588 ft (484 m)	108	2010	Hotel, Office	
7	Chongqing International Trade and Commerce Center	Photo of Chongqing International Land-Sea Center taken on 28.10.2025 from Liziba viewing platform	Flag_of_the_People's_Republic_of_China Chongqing, China	1,503 ft (458 m)	98	2026	Hotel, Office	
8	Suzhou IFS		Flag_of_the_People's_Republic_of_China Suzhou, China	1,476 ft (450 m)	95	2019	Office, Hotel, Residential	Tallest building in Suzhou.
9	One Vanderbilt		Flag_of_the_United_States New York City, United States	1,401 ft (427 m)	62	2020	Office	
10	China Resources Tower		Flag_of_the_People's_Republic_of_China Shenzhen, China	1,288 ft (393 m)	68	2018	Office	
11	Citymark Centre		Flag_of_the_People's_Republic_of_China Shenzhen, China	1,274 ft (388 m)	70	2022	Office, Residential	
12	30 Hudson Yards		Flag_of_the_United_States New York City, United States	1,270 ft (390 m)	73	2019	Office	
13	Autograph Tower		Flag_of_Indonesia Jakarta, Indonesia	1,256 ft (383 m)	75	2022	Office, Hotel	
14	Dabaihui Plaza		Flag_of_the_People's_Republic_of_China Shenzhen, China	1,232 ft (376 m)	70	2021	Office, Residential	
15	Ping An Finance Center		Flag_of_the_People's_Republic_of_China Jinan, China	1,181 ft (360 m)	63	2024	Office, Hotel	
16	Forum 66 Tower 1	Forum_66,_Shenyang,_Oct2014	Flag_of_the_People's_Republic_of_China Shenyang, China	1,150 ft (350 m)	68	2015	Hotel, Office	
17	Spring City 66	昆明恒隆广场 - 2025-05-16 02	Flag_of_the_People's_Republic_of_China Kunming, China	1,145 ft (349 m)	61	2019	Office	
18	One Shenzhen Bay Tower 7	One_Shenzhen_Bay_7_03-10-2018	Flag_of_the_People's_Republic_of_China Shenzhen, China	1,120 ft (340 m)	71	2018	Office, Hotel, Residential	
19	TEDA IFC 1		Flag_of_the_People's_Republic_of_China Tianjin, China	1,027 ft (313 m)	56	2026	Office	
20	Waterline	Waterline_8-3-25	Flag_of_the_United_States Austin, United States	1,021 ft (311 m)	74	2026	Office, Residential, Hotel	
21	Northeast Asia Trade Tower	South_Korea,_Incheon,_Songdo,_the_Prugio_Central_Park_Towers,_Sharp_First_World_Towers,_Sheraton_Hotel_and_Posco_Tower	Flag_of_South_Korea Incheon, South Korea	1,001 ft (305 m)	68	2014	Hotel, Residential, Office	
22	520 Fifth Avenue	520_Fifth_Avenue_Photomontage	Flag_of_the_United_States New York City, United States	1,000 ft (300 m)	76	2026	Residential, Hotel, Office	Built on the site of the former Camolin Building.
23	Luminary Tower	Kompleks_Thamrin_Nine	Flag_of_Indonesia Jakarta, Indonesia	988 ft (301 m)	64	2023	Hotel, Office, Residential	
24	OCT Tower	SZ_深圳_Shenzhen_南山區_Nanshan_華僑城大廈_OCT_Tower_office_main_lobby_July_2023_Px3_05	Flag_of_the_People's_Republic_of_China Shenzhen, China	984 ft (300 m)	60	2020	Office	
25	Greenland Bund Centre Tower 1		Flag_of_the_People's_Republic_of_China Shanghai, China	984 ft (300 m)	64	2025	Hotel, Office	
26	311 South Wacker Drive	Chicago_(5)	Flag_of_the_United_States Chicago, United States	961 ft (293 m)	65	1990	Office	Upon its completion, it was the tallest building known by its street address. Tallest reinforced concrete building in the world from 1990 to 1992.
27	Plaza 66	Plaza_66_Tower_1	Flag_of_the_People's_Republic_of_China Shanghai, China	945 ft (288 m)	66	2001	Office	
28	Ping An Finance Center South	中国平安总部区摩天大楼群	Flag_of_the_People's_Republic_of_China Shenzhen, China	938 ft (286 m)	51	2019	Hotel, Office	
29	Zhenru Center		Flag_of_the_People's_Republic_of_China Shanghai, China	935 ft (285 m)	53	2023	Office	
30	Qiantan Center	Qiantan_Center2	Flag_of_the_People's_Republic_of_China Shanghai, China	919 ft (280 m)	56	2020	Office	
31	Dajia Insurance Group Headquarters		Flag_of_the_People's_Republic_of_China Shenzhen, China	896 ft (273 m)	54	2025	Office	
32	Victoria Dockside	Victoria_Dockside_night_view_201906	Flag_of_Hong_Kong Hong Kong, China	894 ft (272 m)	66	2017	Residential, Office, Hotel	Also known as Rosewood Hong Kong.
33	Shanghai Wheelock Square	Wheelock_Square_-_panoramio	Flag_of_the_People's_Republic_of_China Shanghai, China	887 ft (270 m)	55	2010	Office	
34	10 Hudson Yards	10_Hudson_Yards_August_2024_020	Flag_of_the_United_States New York City, United States	878 ft (268 m)	52	2016	Office	
35	Mori Building		Flag_of_Indonesia Jakarta, Indonesia	871 ft (265 m)	57	2022	Office	
36	900 North Michigan Avenue	Chicago_900_North_Michigan_Avenue_(27940356553)~2	Flag_of_the_United_States Chicago, United States	869 ft (265 m)	66	1989	Office, Hotel, Residential	The building houses a Four Seasons Hotel.
37	Three Sixty West Tower B		Flag_of_India Mumbai, India	853 ft (260 m)	66	2025	Residential	
38	Jing An Kerry Centre Tower 2	201907_Jing_An_Kerry_Centre	Flag_of_the_People's_Republic_of_China Shanghai, China	853 ft (260 m)	58	2013	Office, Hotel	
39	CITIC Ruibo Tower 1	Citic_Ruibo_towers,_Shanghai	Flag_of_the_People's_Republic_of_China Shanghai, China	840 ft (260 m)	55	2017	Office	
40	Corporate Avenue 2		Flag_of_the_People's_Republic_of_China Chongqing, China	839 ft (256 m)	47	2014	Office	
41	Three Sixty West Tower A		Flag_of_India Mumbai, India	839 ft (256 m)	52	2025	Hotel, Residential	
42	Pacific Xintiandi Commercial Center Tower 1		Flag_of_the_People's_Republic_of_China Shanghai, China	820 ft (250 m)	49	2024	Office	
43	China Resources Center		Flag_of_the_People's_Republic_of_China Qingdao, China	820 ft (250 m)		2021	Office, Hotel	
44	Chengdu IFS Tower 1	Chengdu IFS 2	Flag_of_the_People's_Republic_of_China Chengdu, China	810 ft (250 m)	50	2014	Office	
45	Chengdu IFS Tower 2	IFS Chengdu Tower 2-2	Flag_of_the_People's_Republic_of_China Chengdu, China	810 ft (250 m)	50	2014	Office	
46	JR Central Office Tower	JR_Central_Towers	Flag_of_Japan Nagoya, Japan	804 ft (245 m)	51	2000	Office	
47	One Raffles Quay North Tower	One_raffles_quay-rectilinear	Flag_of_Singapore Singapore, Singapore	804 ft (245 m)	50	2006	Office	
48	Marina Bay Financial Centre Office Tower 2	Marina_Bay_Financial_Centre_(8107762133)	Flag_of_Singapore Singapore, Singapore	804 ft (245 m)	45	2010	Office	
49	Chifley Tower	Chifley_Tower_from_the_Royal_Botanic_Gardens	Flag_of_Australia_(WFB_2014) Sydney, Australia	801 ft (244 m)	53	1992	Office	Tallest building in Sydney from 1992 to 2020.
50	BNY Mellon Bank Center	BNY_Mellon_Center_(Philadelphia)_cropped	Flag_of_the_United_States Philadelphia, United States	792 ft (241 m)	54	1990	Office	5th-tallest building in Philadelphia. Also known as Nine Penn Center.
51	111 Murray Street	111_Murray_Street_008	Flag_of_the_United_States New York City, United States	788 ft (240 m)	60	2018	Residential	
52	TEDA IFC 2		Flag_of_the_People's_Republic_of_China Tianjin, China	787 ft (240 m)	62	2026	Residential	
53	KIPCO Tower	KIPCO Tower Kuwait City Skyline 2 (cropped)	Flag_of_Kuwait Kuwait City, Kuwait	787 ft (240 m)	60	2011	Office, Residential	
54	Qianhai Tencent Headquarters Tower 1	Tencent Qianhai Towers 202205	Flag_of_the_People's_Republic_of_China Shenzhen, China	787 ft (240 m)	48	2022	Office	
55	Greenland Bund Centre Tower 3		Flag_of_the_People's_Republic_of_China Shanghai, China	787 ft (240 m)	45	2022	Office	
56	Marina Bay Financial Centre Office Tower 3	Marina Bay Financial Centre, Singapore - 20121110	Flag_of_Singapore Singapore, Singapore	786 ft (240 m)	46	2012	Office	
57	Roppongi Hills Mori Tower	Roppongi_Hills_Mori_Tower_from_Tokyo_Tower_Day_cropped	Flag_of_Japan Tokyo, Japan	781 ft (238 m)	54	2003	Office	
58	CITIC Ruibo Tower 2	Citic_Ruibo_towers,_Shanghai	Flag_of_the_People's_Republic_of_China Shanghai, China	781 ft (238 m)	52	2017	Office	
59	55 Hudson Yards	Bella_Abzug_Park_td_(2023-06-23)_009_-_Block_2,_55_Hudson_Yards	Flag_of_the_United_States New York City, United States	780 ft (240 m)	51	2018	Office	
60	Madison Square Park Tower	Madison_Square_Park_Tower_February_2017	Flag_of_the_United_States New York City, United States	778 ft (237 m)	61	2017	Residential	
61	The First World Tower 1	South_Korea,_Incheon,_Songdo,_the_Prugio_Central_Park_Towers,_Sharp_First_World_Towers,_and_Sheraton_Hotel	Flag_of_South_Korea Incheon, South Korea	776 ft (237 m)	67	2009	Residential	
62	The First World Tower 2	South_Korea,_Incheon,_Songdo,_the_Prugio_Central_Park_Towers,_Sharp_First_World_Towers,_and_Sheraton_Hotel	Flag_of_South_Korea Incheon, South Korea	776 ft (237 m)	67	2009	Residential	
63	The First World Tower 3	South_Korea,_Incheon,_Songdo,_the_Prugio_Central_Park_Towers,_Sharp_First_World_Towers,_and_Sheraton_Hotel	Flag_of_South_Korea Incheon, South Korea	776 ft (237 m)	67	2009	Residential	
64	The First World Tower 4	South_Korea,_Incheon,_Songdo,_the_Prugio_Central_Park_Towers,_Sharp_First_World_Towers,_and_Sheraton_Hotel	Flag_of_South_Korea Incheon, South Korea	776 ft (237 m)	67	2009	Residential	
65	1201 Third Avenue Tower	1201_Third_Avenue	Flag_of_the_United_States Seattle, United States	772 ft (235 m)	55	1988	Office	
66	Tour First	Tour First La Défense depuis l'Arc de Triomphe Janvier 2023 (cropped)	Flag_of_France Courbevoie, France	758 ft (231 m)	56	2011	Office	
67	Grant Thornton Tower	2004-08-31 1600x2840 chicago chicago title and trust building	Flag_of_the_United_States Chicago, United States	756 ft (230 m)	50	1992	Office	
68	Heron Tower	Heron Tower from Bury St. 2011-05-04	Flag_of_the_United_Kingdom_(3-5) London, United Kingdom	755 ft (230 m)	46	2011	Office	
69	International Fortune Plaza Tower A		Flag_of_the_People's_Republic_of_China Suzhou, China	755 ft (230 m)	44	2016	Office	
70	Wanxiang City Tower 1		Flag_of_the_People's_Republic_of_China Hangzhou, China	754 ft (230 m)	47	2015	Office	

== See also ==
- Kohn Pedersen Fox buildings
- List of architecture firms
- List of architects
