= Hang Lung =

Hang Lung may refer to the following Hong Kong companies:

- Hang Lung Group, a listed company
- Hang Lung Properties, subsidiary of Hang Lung Group
- Hang Lung Centre, a commercial building and shopping mall in Causeway Bay, Hong Kong, then H&M Flagship Store.
- Hang Lung Bank, a defunct bank
- Hang Lung Plaza (disambiguation), properties in China developed by Hang Lung Properties
