= Grant Thornton Tower =

Office skyscraper in Chicago, Illinois

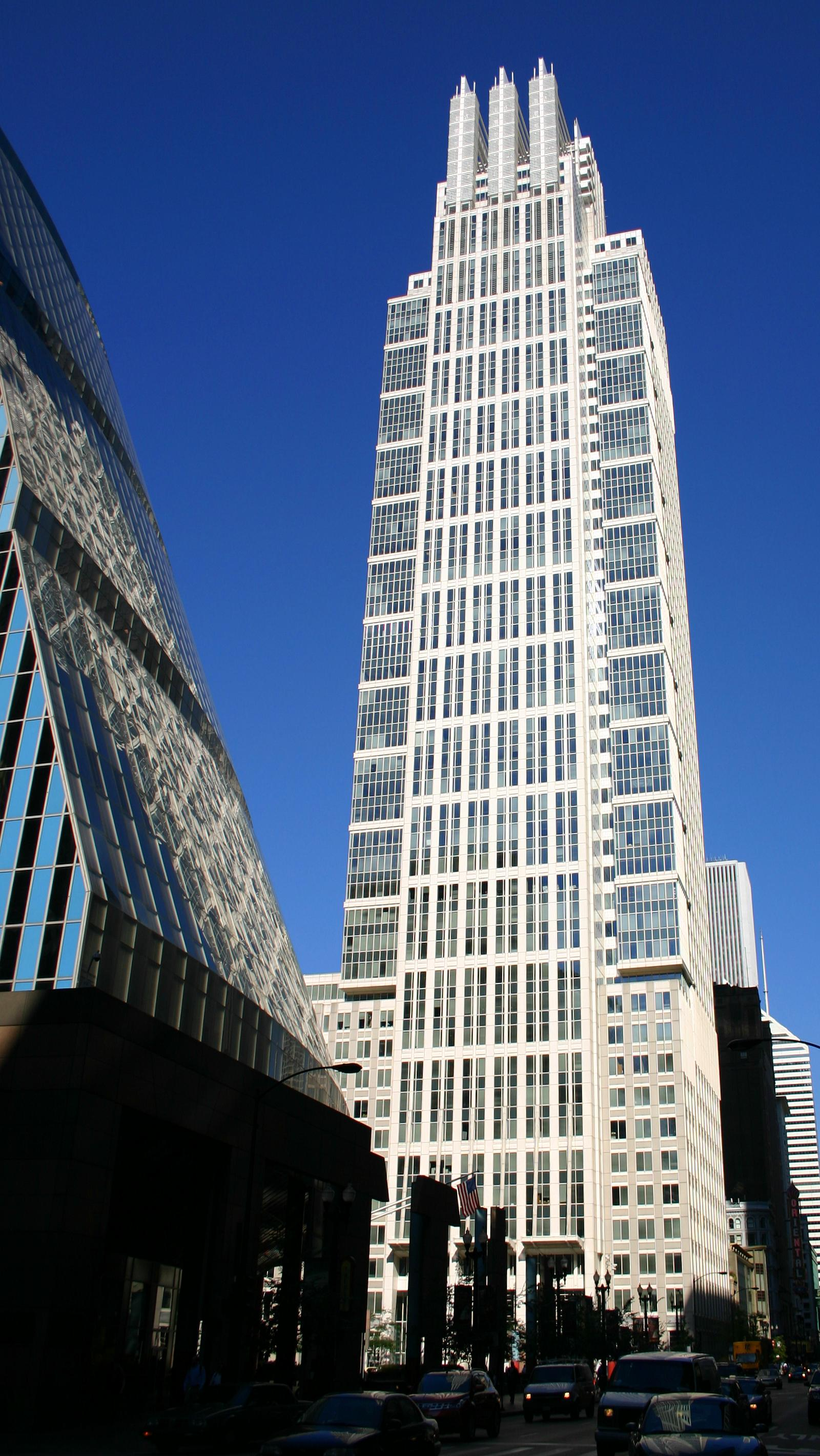
- Grant Thornton Tower as seen from the west

- Location within Chicago metropolitan area Grant Thornton Tower (Illinois) Grant Thornton Tower (the United States)

General information
- Type: Office
- Location: 171 N. Clark St. Chicago, Illinois; United States
- Coordinates: 41°53′05.6″N 87°37′50″W
- Construction started: 1990
- Completed: 1992

Height
- Antenna spire: 756 ft (230 m)

Technical details
- Floor count: 50
- Lifts/elevators: 23

Design and construction
- Architect: Kohn Pedersen Fox Associates
- Structural engineer: Severud Associates

Grant Thornton Tower (formerly Chicago Title & Trust Center, 161 North Clark and sometimes Chicago Title Tower) is an office tower located in Chicago designed by the firm Kohn Pedersen Fox Associates. Before completion in 1990 the twin tower design was awarded The Chicago Athenaeum's "Best Building" Architecture Award, the award was received by one of the lead designers Kevin Flanagan. (view PLP Architects). The fifty-storey building rises 756 feet (230 m) in the Loop and was completed in 1992, on the site of Chicago's Greyhound Bus Station. Previously, a structure at 111 West Washington was known as the Chicago Title & Trust Building. After CT&T moved to the new tower in 1992, its former home became known as the Burnham Center.

One of the tower's most notable features is its eastern-facing slanted roof at upper levels. At night, the top of the building facing east and west is flooded with light, creating a memorable presence on the Chicago skyline.

The building was originally intended to have a twin at 181 N. Clark Street, but the plan has been dropped twice: initially, after the completion of the first tower, and then a second time in 2001 after the 9/11 terror attacks. A multi-level parking structure currently occupies the space where the north tower may someday be constructed.

It has a basement-level pedway connection westward to the south-east corner of the James R. Thompson Center's food court.

As initial tenant CT&T reduced its presence in the building, it became known by its address (161 North Clark). In 2012, Grant Thornton International acquired the naming rights to the building for its 2015 lease. The official address has moved as Grant Thornton's official address is Grant Thornton Tower, 171 North Clark, Suite 200, Chicago, Illinois, 60601 according to U.S. Securities and Exchange Commission filings.

== Tenants ==
- Accenture
- Bryan Cave
- GE Capital Rail Services

== Position in Chicago's skyline ==
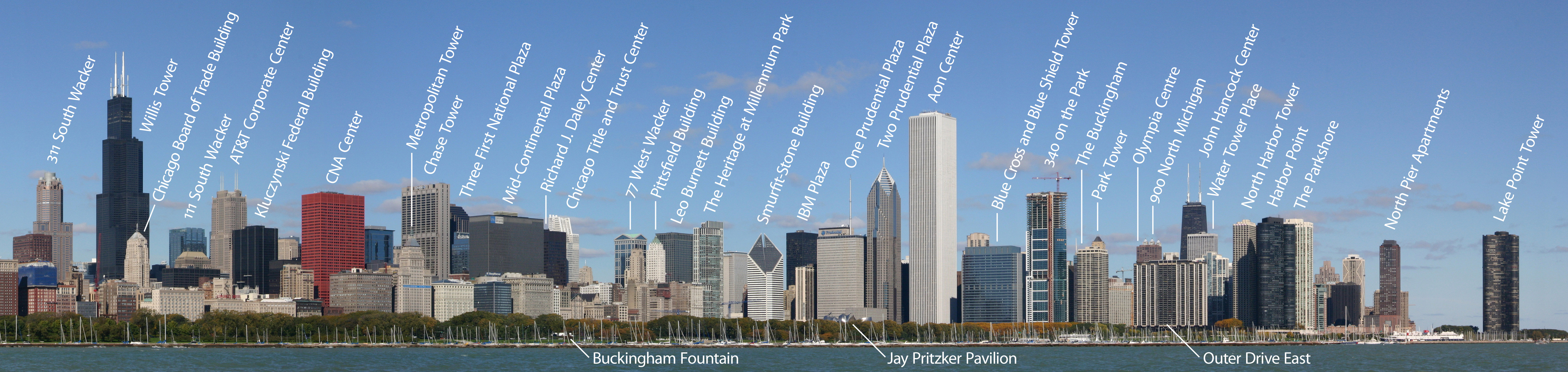

== See also ==
- List of skyscrapers
- List of tallest buildings in the United States
- List of tallest buildings in Chicago
- World's tallest structures
