= 10 Hudson Yards =

Office skyscraper in Manhattan, New York

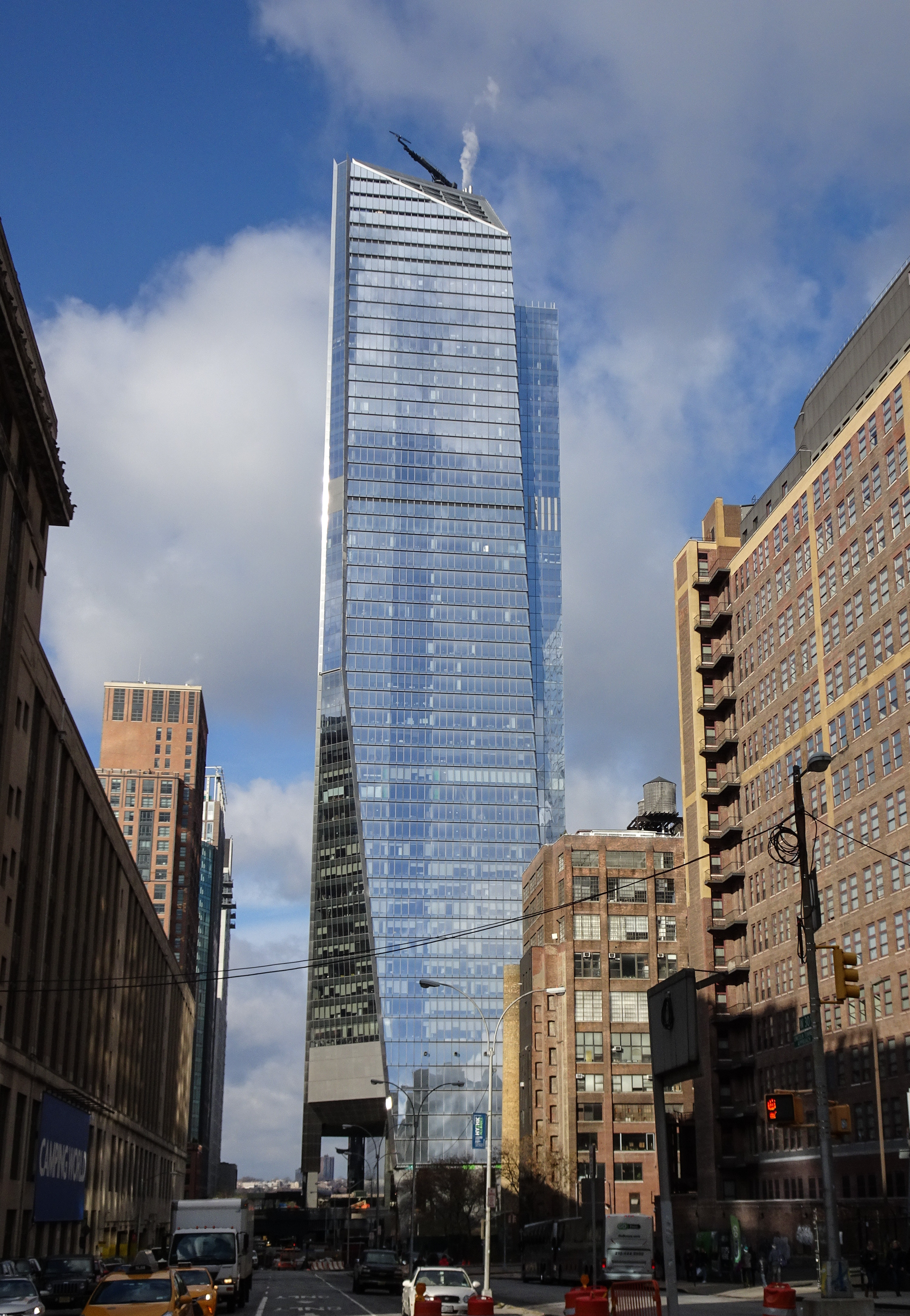
- Seen in 2016
- Alternative names: South Tower

General information
- Status: Completed
- Type: Office
- Architectural style: Neo-futurism
- Location: 501 West 30th Street; New York, NY 10001; U.S.
- Coordinates: 40.7525°N 74.0010°W
- Groundbreaking: December 4, 2012
- Construction started: August 2013
- Completed: May 31, 2016
- Operator: The Related Companies; Oxford Properties

Height
- Roof: 878 feet (268 m)
- Top floor: 704 feet (215 m)

Technical details
- Floor count: 52
- Floor area: 1,700,698 square feet (158,000.0 m^{2})
- Lifts/elevators: 27

Design and construction
- Architects: Kohn Pedersen Fox (architect & master planner)
- Main contractor: Tutor Perini Building

Website
- Official website

Map of buildings and structures at Hudson Yards. Zoom the map and click on points for more details.

10 Hudson Yards, also known as the South Tower, is an office building that was completed in 2016 on the West Side of Manhattan in New York City, United States. Located near Hell's Kitchen, Chelsea and the Penn Station area, the building is a part of the Hudson Yards urban renewal project, a plan to redevelop the Metropolitan Transportation Authority's West Side Yard. Coach New York is the anchor tenant. During planning, the tower was known as Tower C.

== History ==
=== Construction ===
Hudson Yards, conceived through a large master plan by Kohn Pedersen Fox, is expected to consist of 16 skyscrapers containing more than 12.7 million square feet (1,180,000 m^{2}) of new office, residential, and retail space. Among its components will be 6 million square feet (560,000 m^{2}) of commercial office space, a 750,000-square-foot (70,000 m^{2}) retail center with two levels of restaurants, cafes, markets and bars, a hotel, a cultural space, about 5,000 residences, a 750-seat school, and 14 acres (5.7 ha) of public open space. 10 Hudson Yards, the first building on the site, is expected to help draw visitors to the area.

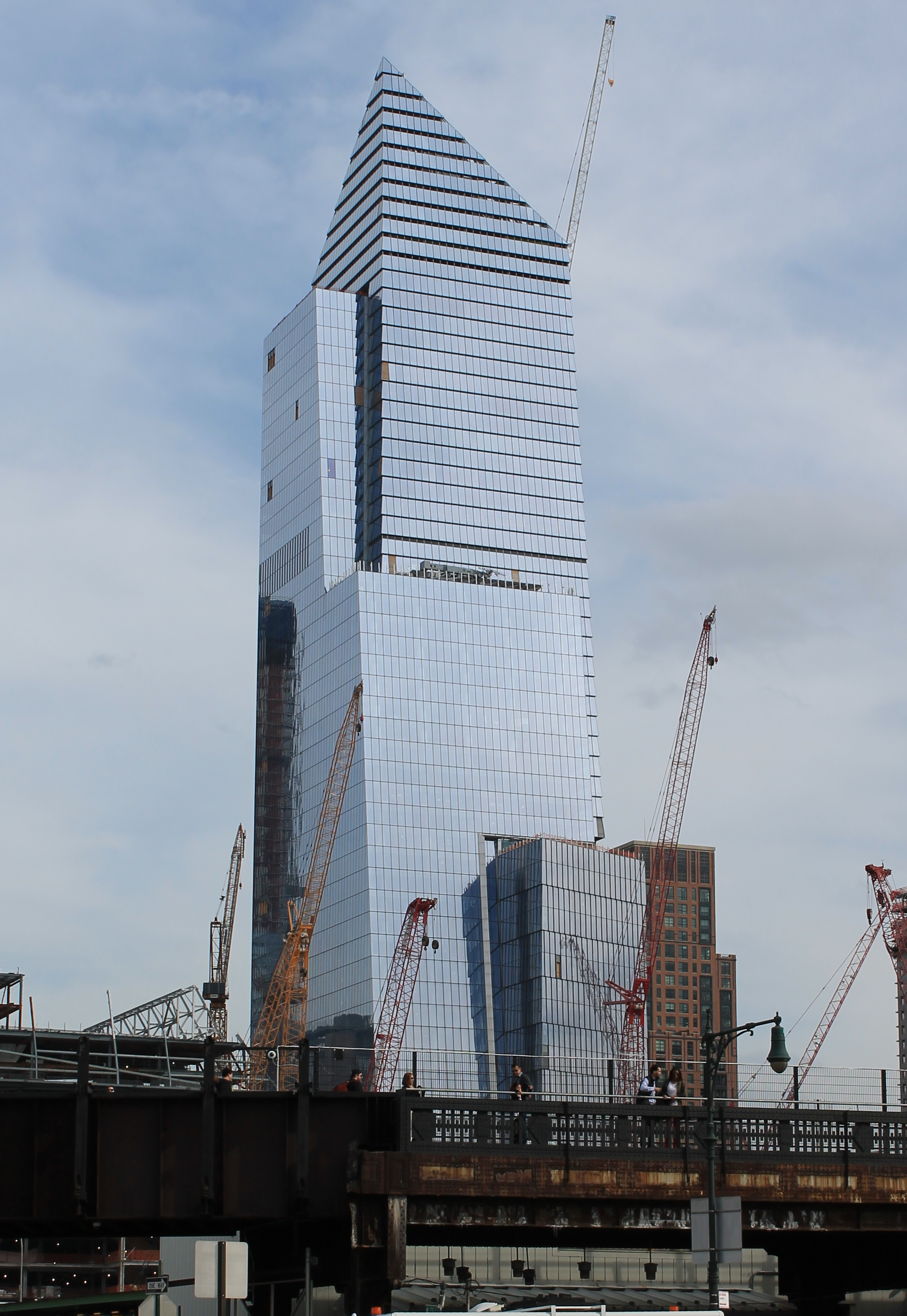
March 2016

Groundbreaking for 10 Hudson Yards occurred on December 4, 2012, with a provisional completion date of 2016. Foundation work continued through the first half of 2013 and the superstructure work began on the tower in August 2013. During excavation work, 70,000 cubic yards (54,000 m^{3}) of soil was removed and 11,000 cubic yards (8,400 m^{3}) of concrete was poured. The contract to construct the tower was awarded to a subsidiary of Tutor Perini in March 2013. The tower is the first tower in the Hudson Yards complex to have been completed, because it is the only Hudson Yards tower not on the artificial platform over the West Side Yards.

As of March 2014, 10 Hudson Yards had risen more than 100 feet (30 m). As of February 2015, 10 Hudson Yards was 27 stories tall. As of April 2015, thirty-two of the tower's 52 floors had been completed. As of November 2015, 10 Hudson Yards had topped out. The tower was opened on May 31, 2016, with the first 300 Coach, Inc. employees moving into the building. As of November 2022, 10 Hudson Yards was the 49th-tallest building in the United States.

The southern facade of 10 Hudson Yards cantilevers over the 30th Street spur of the High Line, and one of the building's entrances is to be located on the High Line. The architectural firm who designed 10 Hudson Yards was Kohn Pedersen Fox. Thornton Tomasetti was the structural engineer; Jaros, Baum & Bolles performed the MEP engineering; and Langan served as lead civil engineer. In January 2019, the developers unveiled a 30 feet (9.1 m) long sculpture by American artist Jonathan Borofsky for the west lobby.

=== Occupancy ===
The first tenants were signed in April 2013. The building is anchored by Tapestry, Inc.'s global headquarters, which covers 737,774 square feet (68,541 m^{2}) on floors 9 to 24 within the tower. Coach's space includes a 15-story atrium, double height conference rooms overlooking the High Line, a private cafeteria, and a large terrace with views of the Hudson River. Coach was the first tenant to move into the new building on May 31, 2016. In September 2017, Coach subleased 148,000 square feet (13,700 m^{2}) of space to The Guardian Life Insurance Company of America.

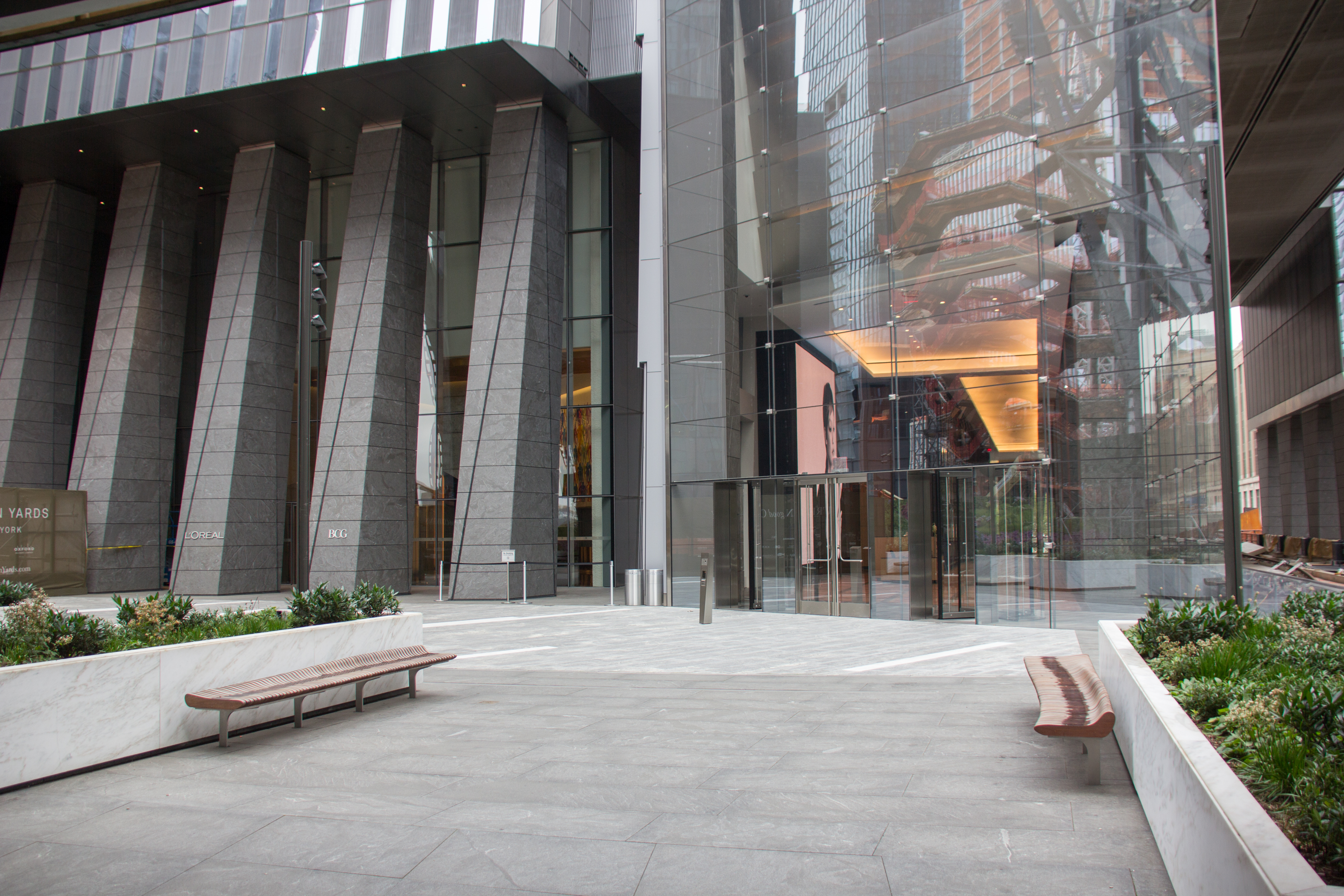
Building Entrance

In total, the building was designed to accommodate over 7,000 employees. Additional occupants include L'Oreal USA, Boston Consulting Group, SAP, and Intersection occupying 402,000 square feet (37,300 m^{2}), 193,295 square feet (17,957.7 m^{2}) and 115,000 square feet (10,700 m^{2}), and 67,000 square feet (6,200 m^{2}) respectively. VaynerMedia occupies the building's 25th floor.

There will also be retail space at street level adjacent to the retail building immediately to the north of 10 Hudson Yards. That building will be designed by Elkus Manfredi Architects. Fairway, a locally based grocer, was expected to build a store in the lower floors of the building, occupying 45,875 square feet (4,262 m^{2}). Additionally, Spanish chef José Andrés will operate a 35,000 square feet (3,300 m^{2}) food hall named Mercado Little Spain which will contain a wine bar, a cocktail bar, and 15 kiosks serving different kinds of tapas. An outpost of fast casual salad restaurant Sweetgreen opened in August 2018 in the base of the tower.

=== Ownership ===
10 Hudson Yards was initially owned by the master developers of the Hudson Yards project, Related Companies and Oxford Properties, in partnership with the Kuwait Investment Authority. Various sections of the tower were sold to tenants as office condos, with Coach purchasing their space for $750 million prior to construction. In August 2016, Coach sold their stake in the tower to Allianz for $420 million. The deal gave Allianz 44% ownership and valued the building at $2.15 billion. In May 2018, the State Teachers Retirement System of Ohio purchased roughly 20% of the tower for $432 million at a similar valuation.

== Gallery ==
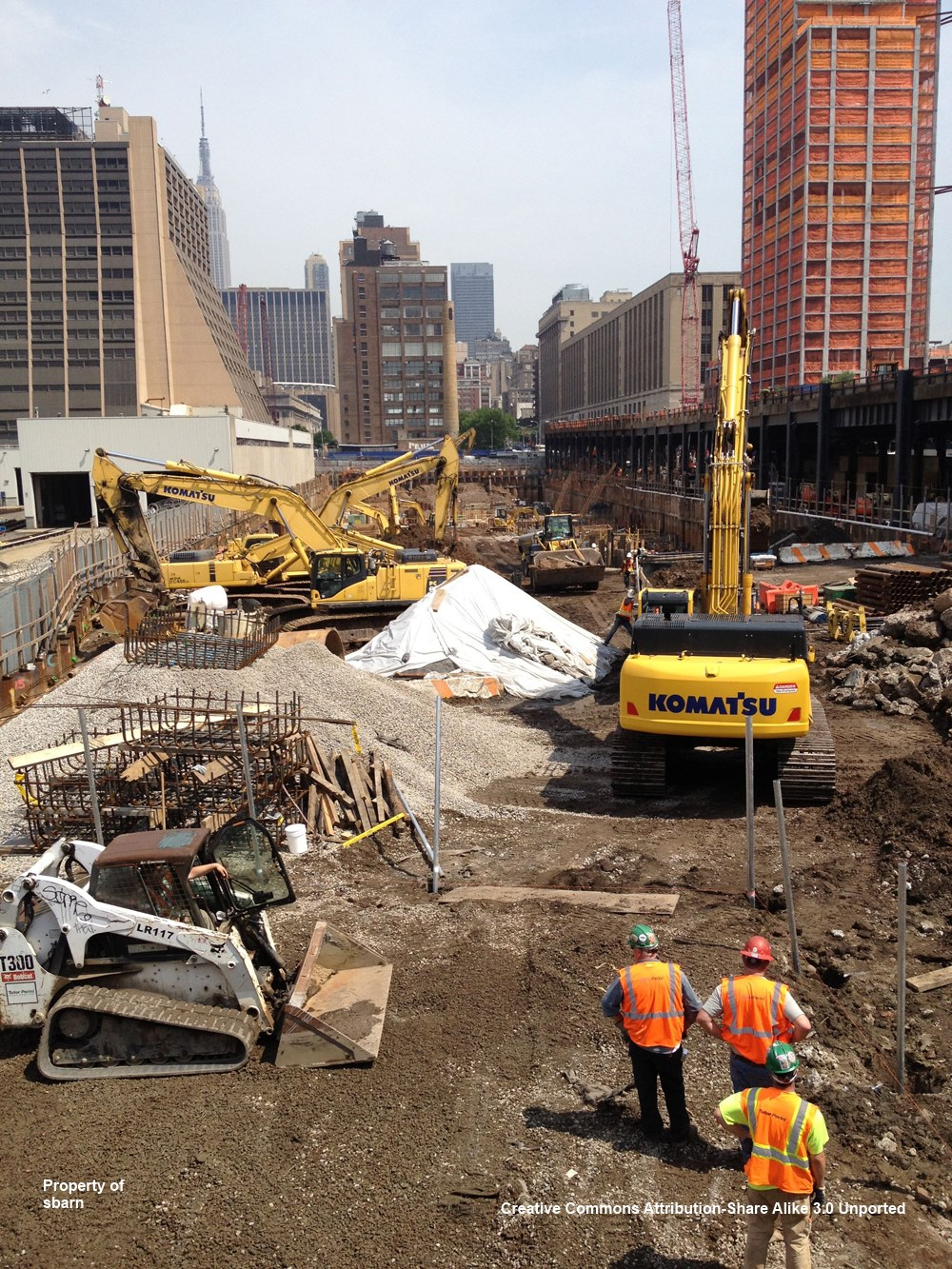
May 2013

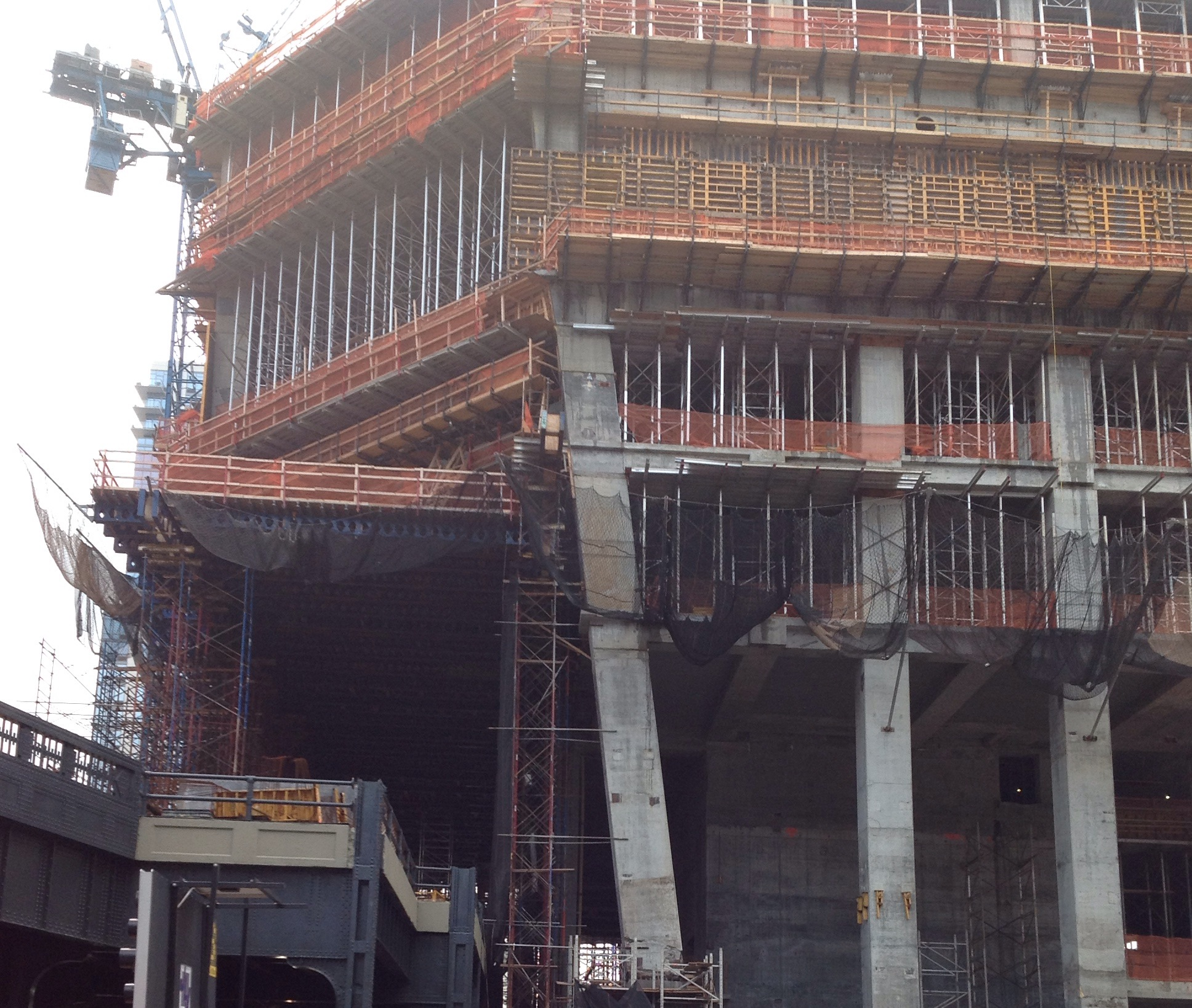
June 2014; close-up of 10 Hudson Yards columns on eastern facade

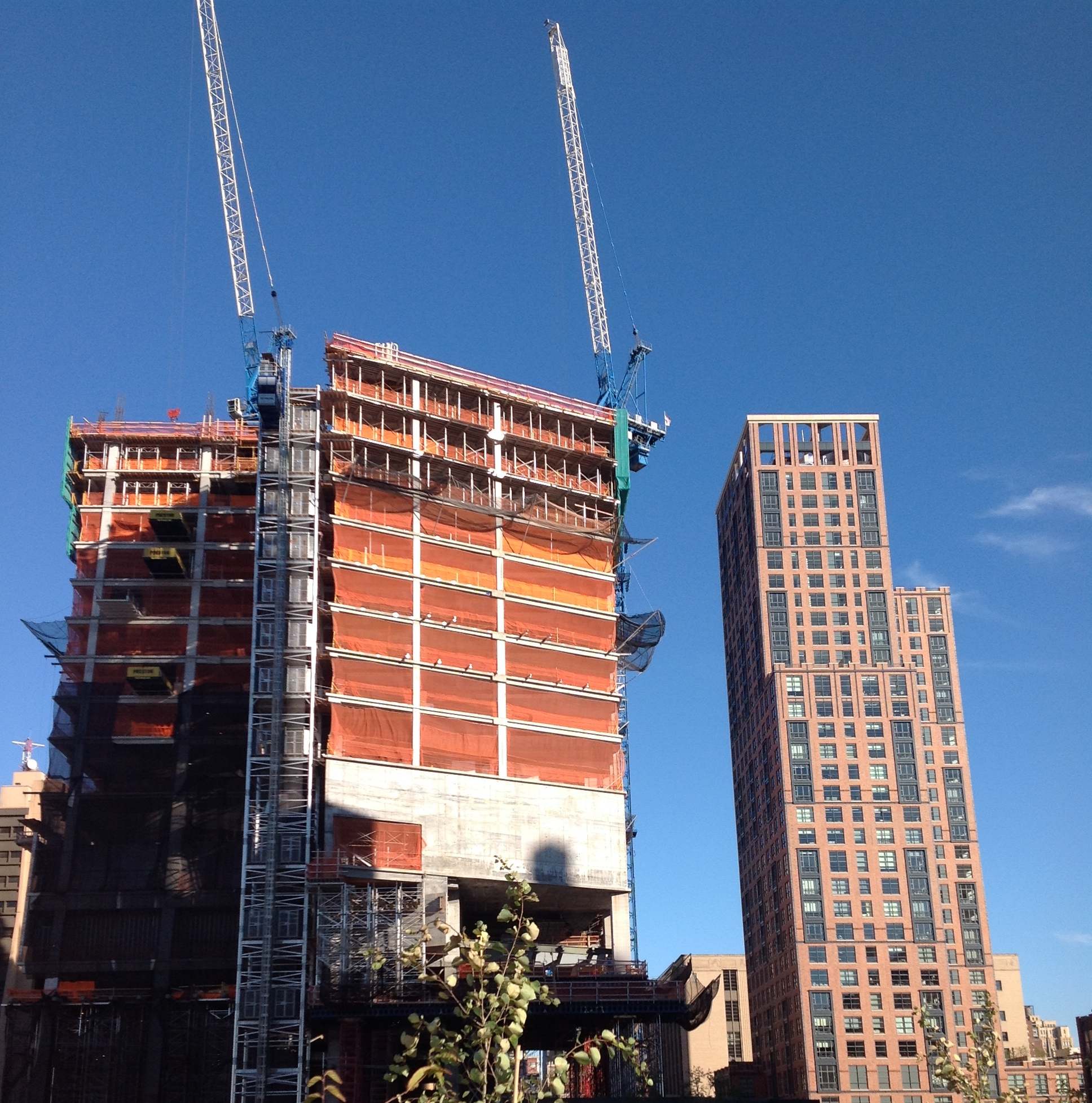
September 2014; Abington House is to the right

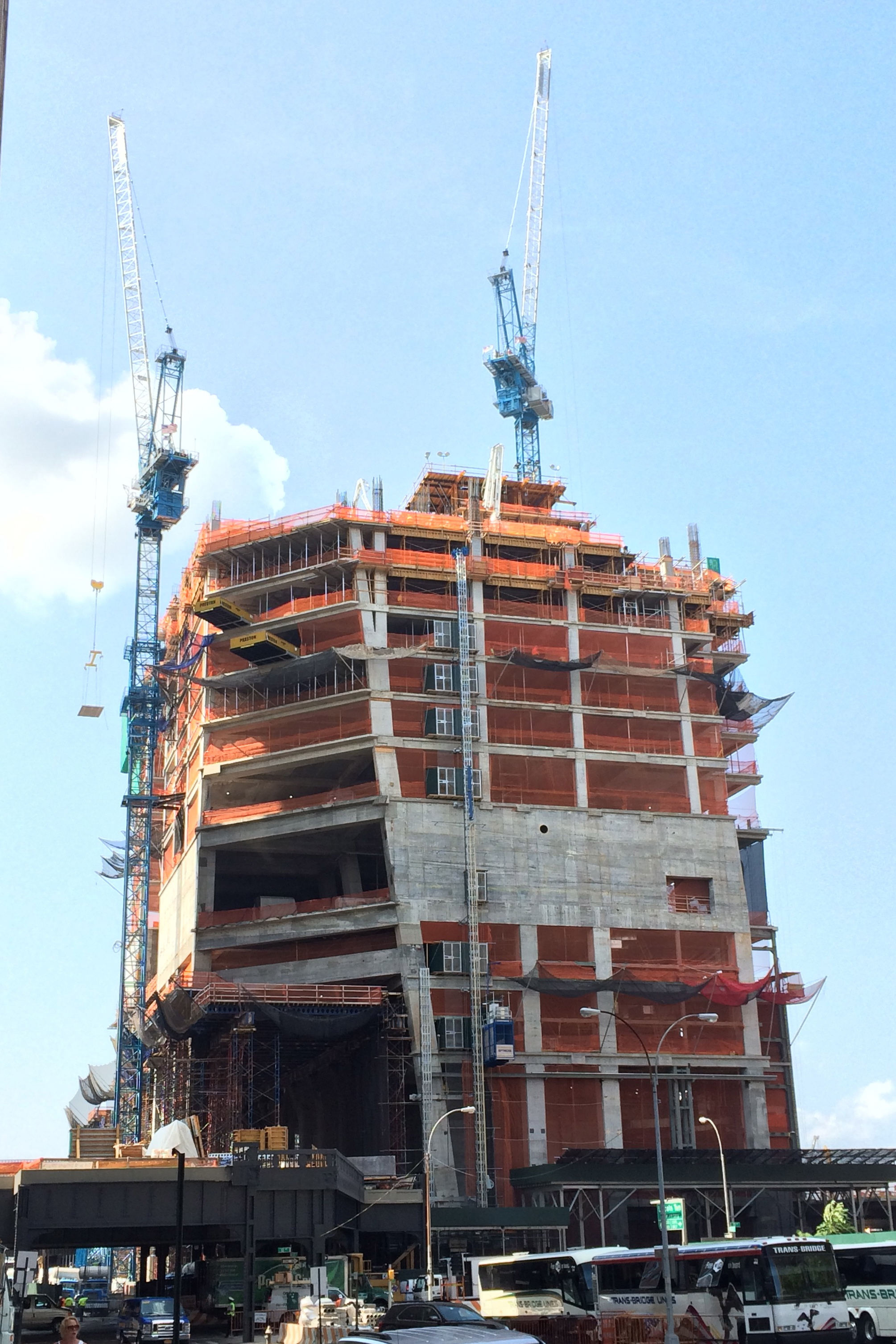
September 2014, from 30th Street

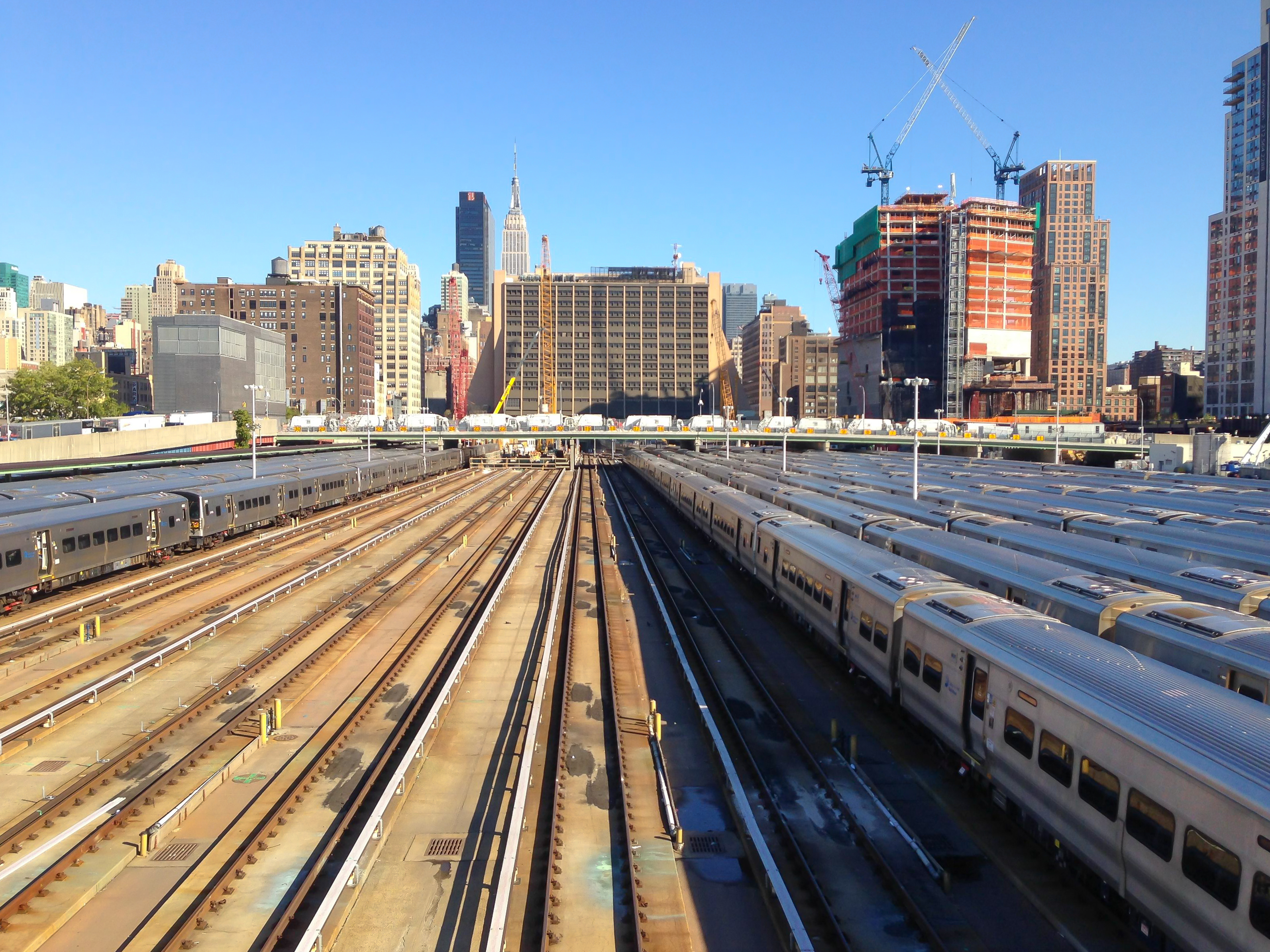
September 2014, from far west side of the site

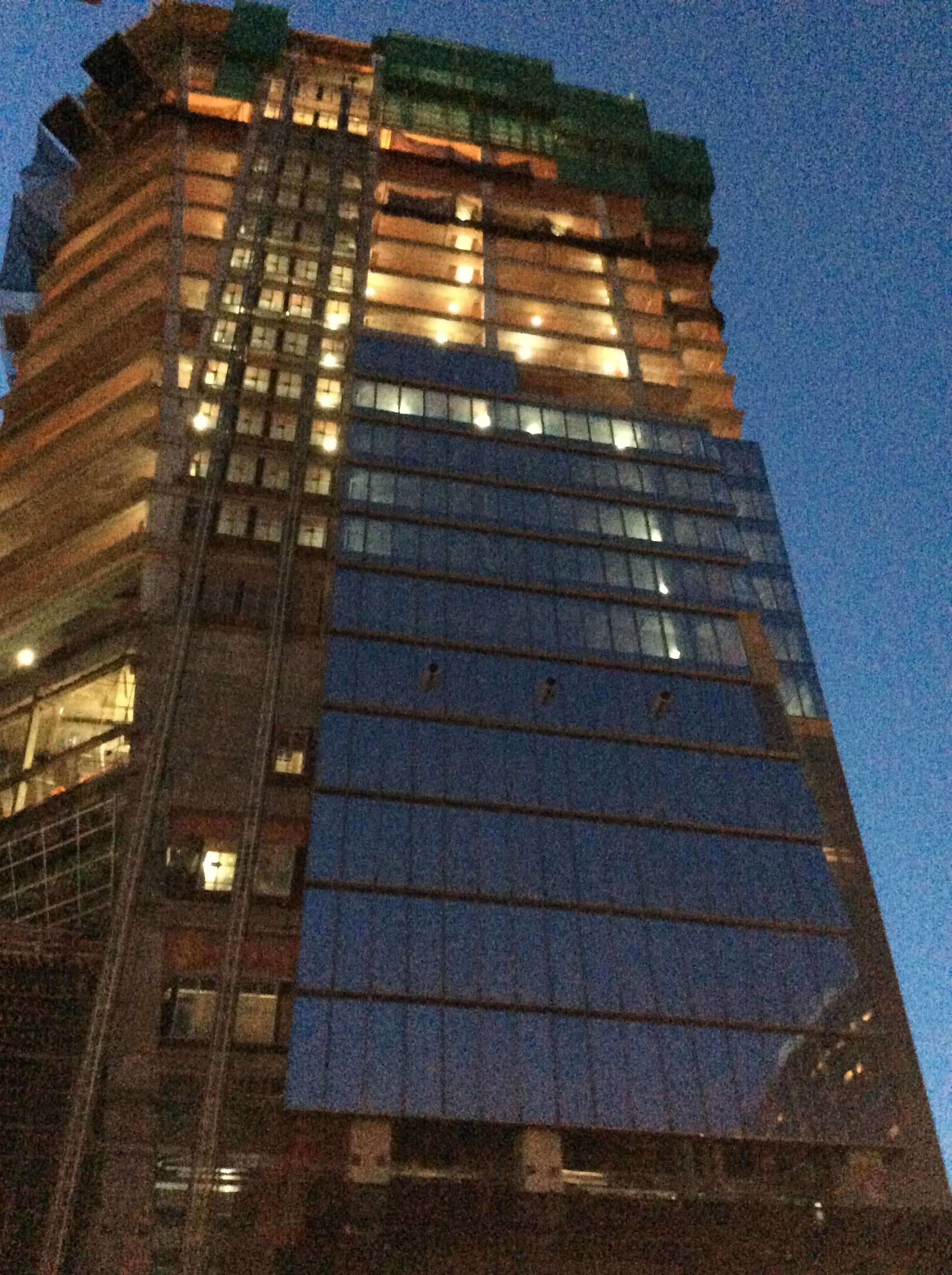
December 2014

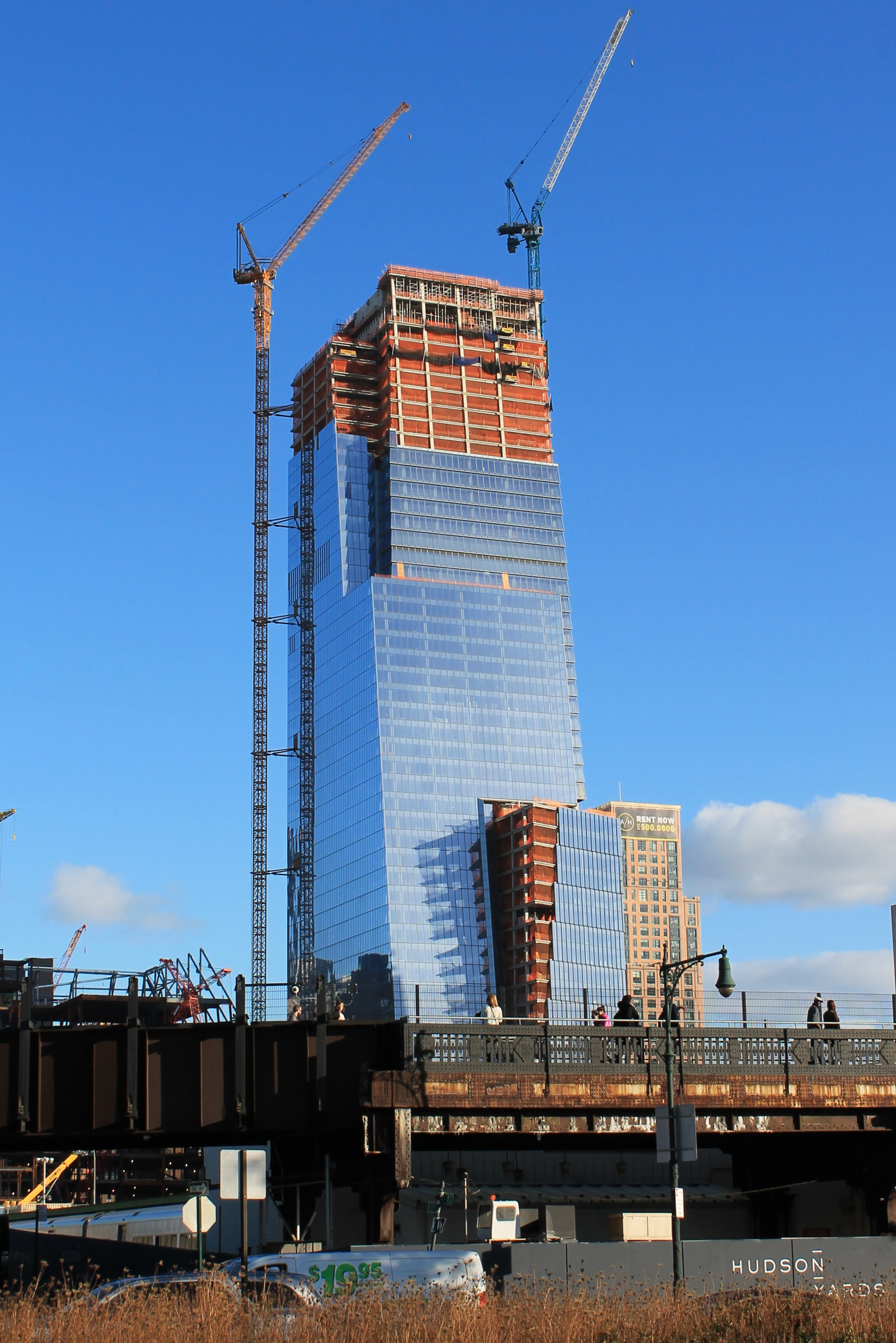
October 2015

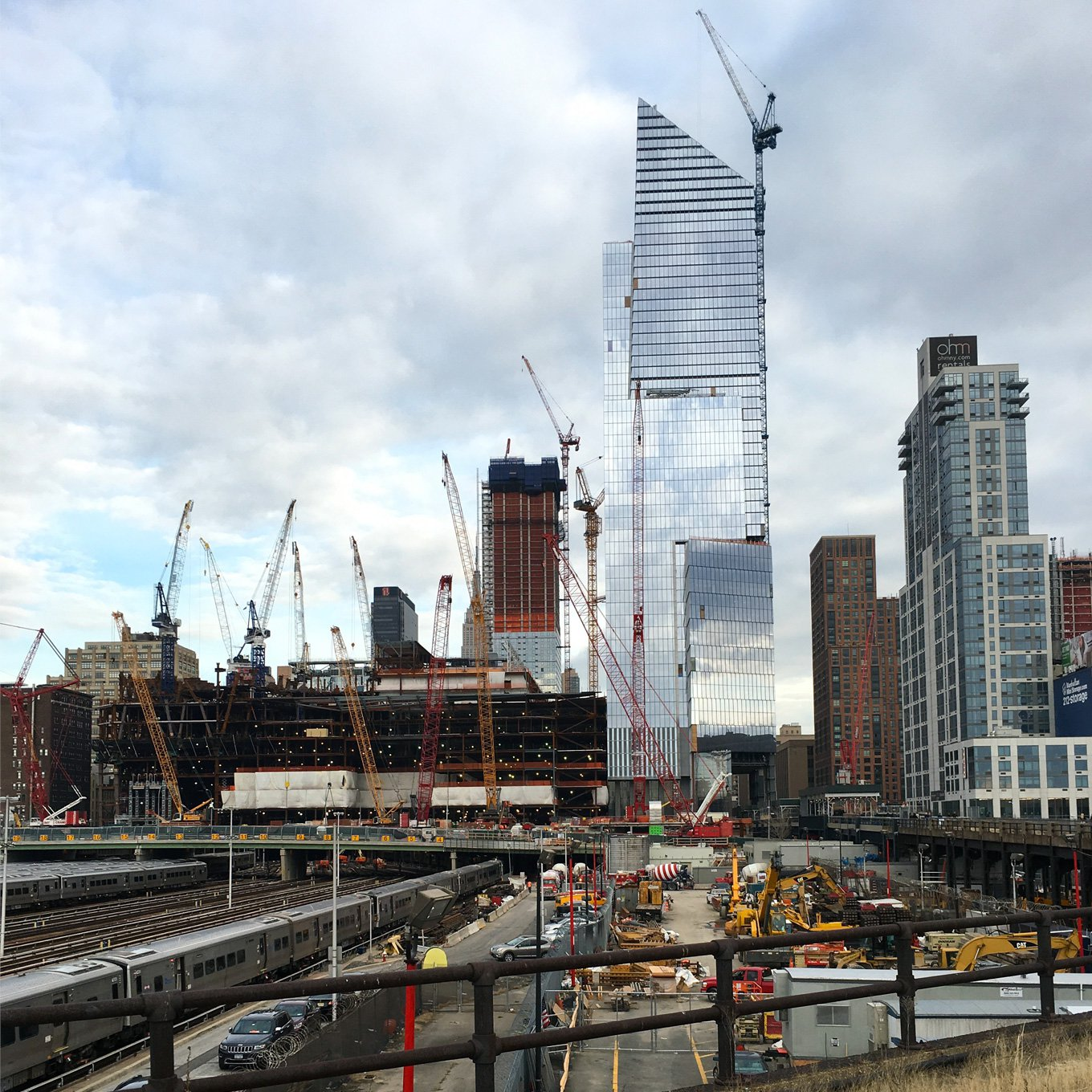
April 2016

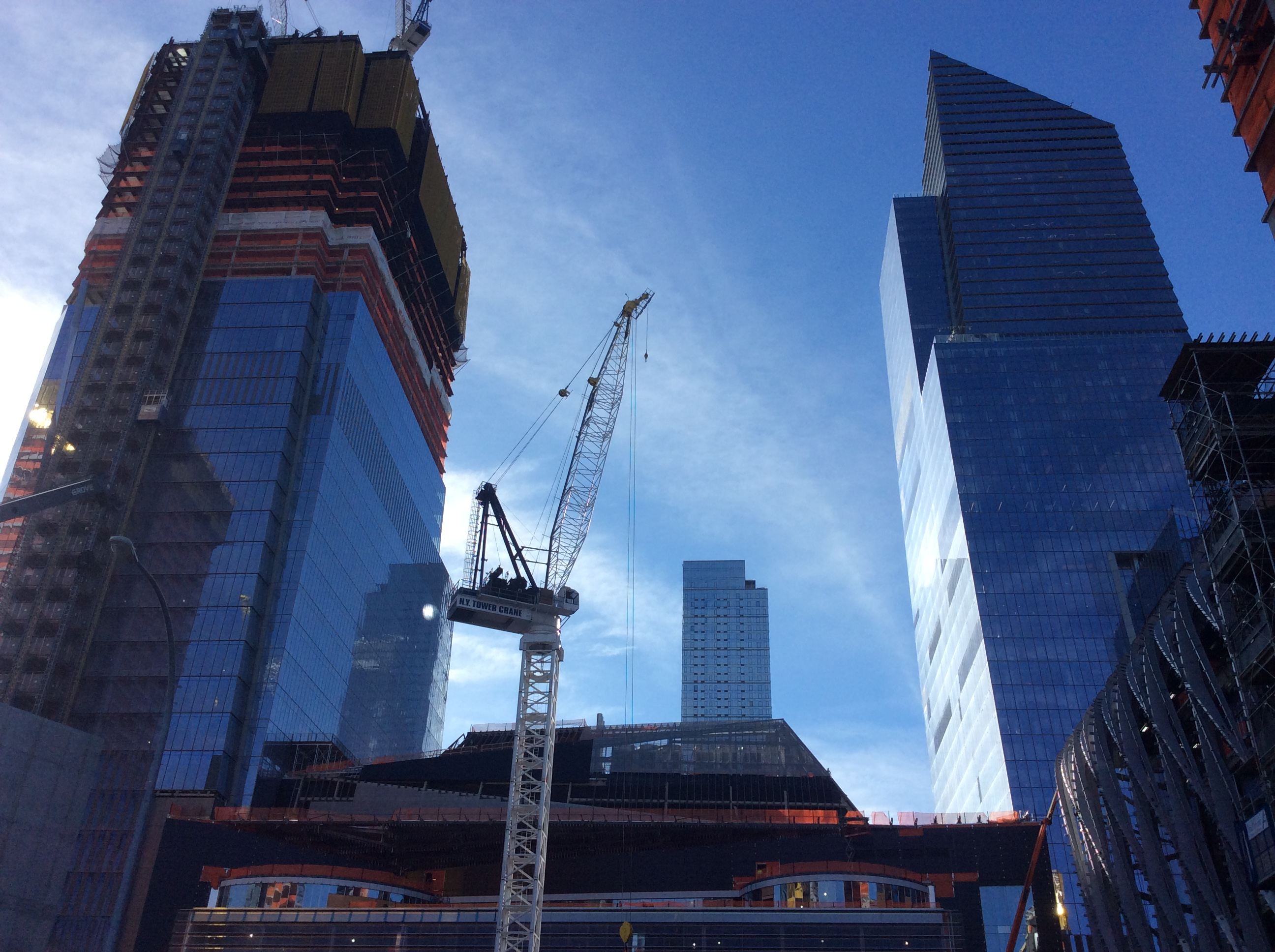
The completed 10 Hudson Yards (on the right) with 30 Hudson Yards still under construction (on the left) as of May 2017

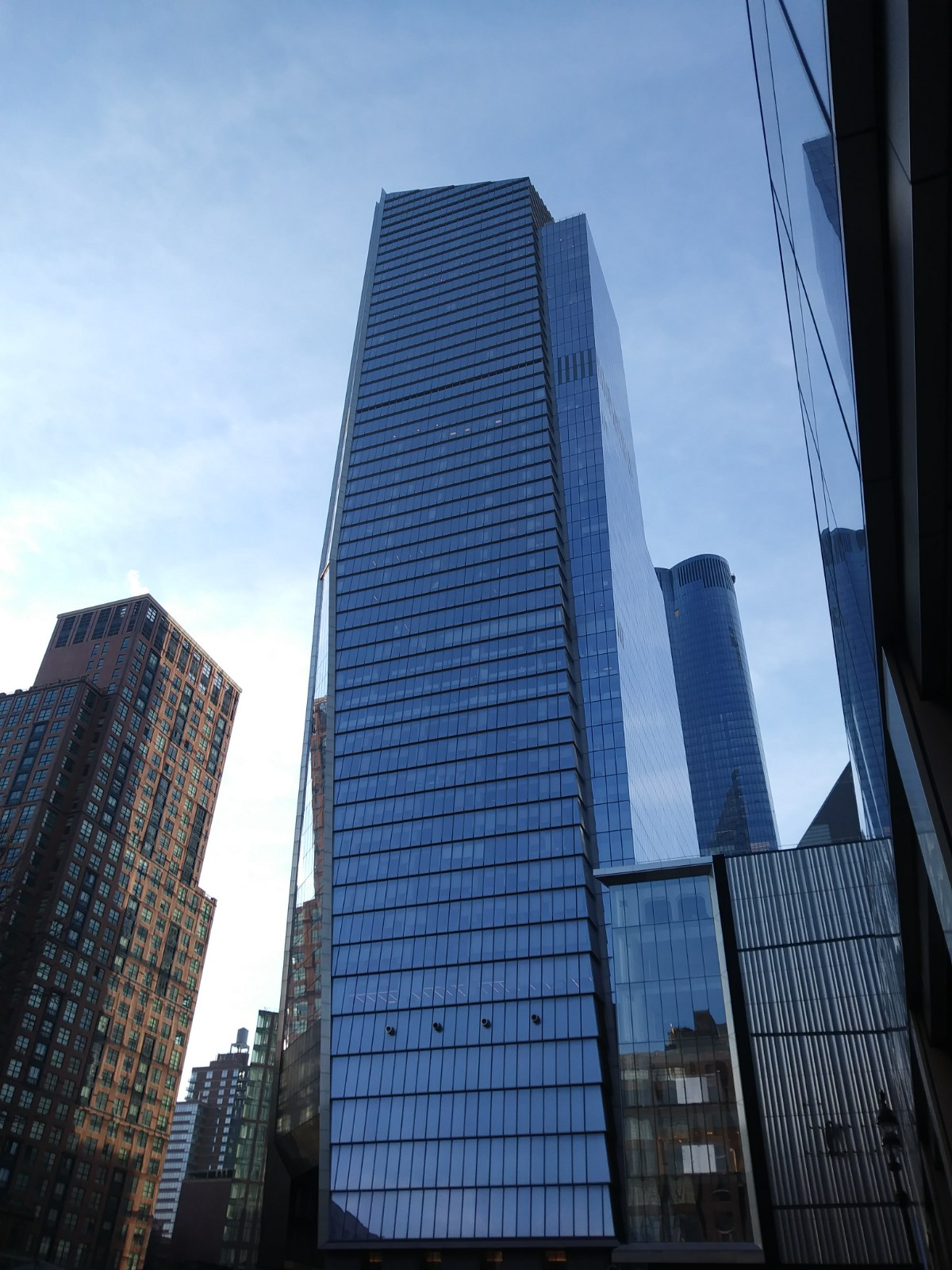
February 2019

== See also ==
- List of tallest buildings in New York City
- Hudson Yards Redevelopment Project
