= Forum 66 =

Skyscraper complex in Shenyang, Liaoning, China

Forum 66 Tower 1
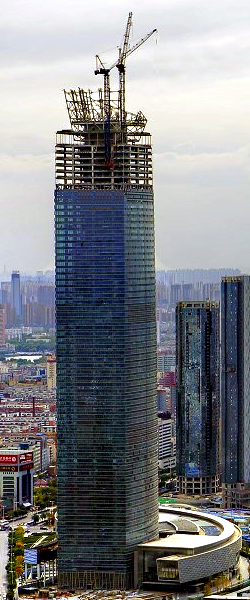
- Forum 66 Tower 1 under construction in October 2014
- Interactive map of the Forum 66 Tower 1 area

General information
- Status: Completed
- Type: Mixed-use
- Location: 1 Qingnian Dajie, Shenhe District, Shenyang, Liaoning
- Coordinates: 41°47′58″N 123°25′39″E
- Construction started: June 17, 2008
- Opening: October 8, 2015

Height
- Roof: 351 m (1,151.6 ft)

Technical details
- Floor count: 68
- Floor area: 420,000 m^{2} (4,500,000 sq ft)

Design and construction
- Architect: Kohn Pedersen Fox

Forum 66 Tower 2
- Interactive map of the Forum 66 Tower 2 area

General information
- Status: Under construction
- Type: Mixed-use
- Location: 1 Qingnian Dajie, Shenhe District, Shenyang, Liaoning
- Construction started: June 17, 2008
- Opening: ?

Height
- Roof: 384 m (1,259.8 ft)

Technical details
- Floor count: 76
- Floor area: 3 m (9.8 ft)

Design and construction
- Architect: Kohn Pedersen Fox

Forum 66 (simplified Chinese: 市府恒隆广场; traditional Chinese: 市府恆隆廣場; pinyin: Shìfǔ Hénglóng Guǎngchǎng) is a twin tower complex in Shenyang, Liaoning. The complex consists of two supertall skyscrapers; Tower 1 is 384 m (1,260 ft) with 76 floors and Tower 2 is 351 m (1,152 ft) with 68 floors. Tower 1 was completed in 2015 whilst the construction of Tower 2 has been suspended as of 2026.

The buildings were developed by Hang Lung Properties and share their Chinese name with other projects of Hang Lung, like Plaza 66.
