= Continental Engineering Corporation Tower =

Skyscraper in Da'an, Taipei, Taiwan

Continental Engineering Corporation Tower 大陸工程敦南大樓
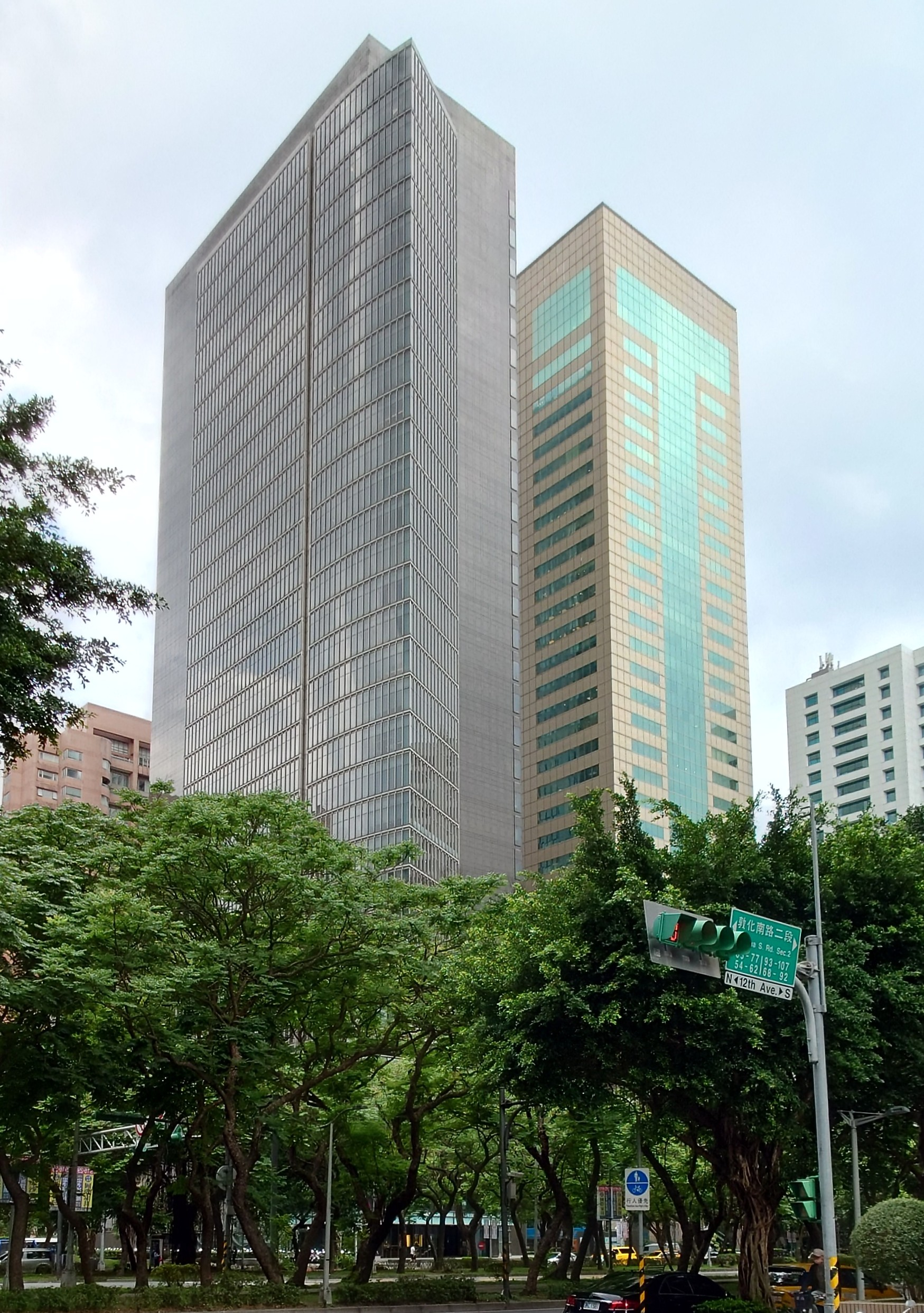
- Building on the left
- Interactive map of the Continental Engineering Corporation Tower 大陸工程敦南大樓 area

General information
- Type: Office
- Location: No. 93, Section 2, Dunhua South Road, Daan District, Taipei, Taiwan
- Coordinates: 25.03199189881468°N 121.55007897882086°E
- Construction started: 1999
- Completed: 2003

Height
- Architectural: 140 m (460 ft)

Technical details
- Floor count: 31

Design and construction
- Architect: Kohn Pedersen Fox Associates

The Continental Engineering Corporation Tower, or CEC Tower for short (Chinese: 大陸工程敦南大樓), is a skyscraper office building in Daan District, Taipei, Taiwan. The height of building is 140 m (460 ft), and it comprises 31 floors above ground as well as six levels below ground. It is the corporate headquarters of Continental Engineering Corporation. As of February 2021, it is the 23rd tallest building in Taipei.

== Design ==
The tower was completed in 2002 and was designed by Kohn Pedersen Fox Associates. For the exterior of the first five floors of the building, granite panels were used with a coated double glazed façade to provide high transparency, thermal insulation and soundproofing on the north and west sides of the building. Natural sunlight can stream through the curtain wall to save on energy usage.

== See also ==
- List of tallest buildings in Taiwan
- List of tallest buildings in Taipei
- Continental Engineering Corporation
