= Hong Kong University of Science and Technology Library =

Library of the Hong Kong University of Science and Technology

- 香港科技大學圖書館
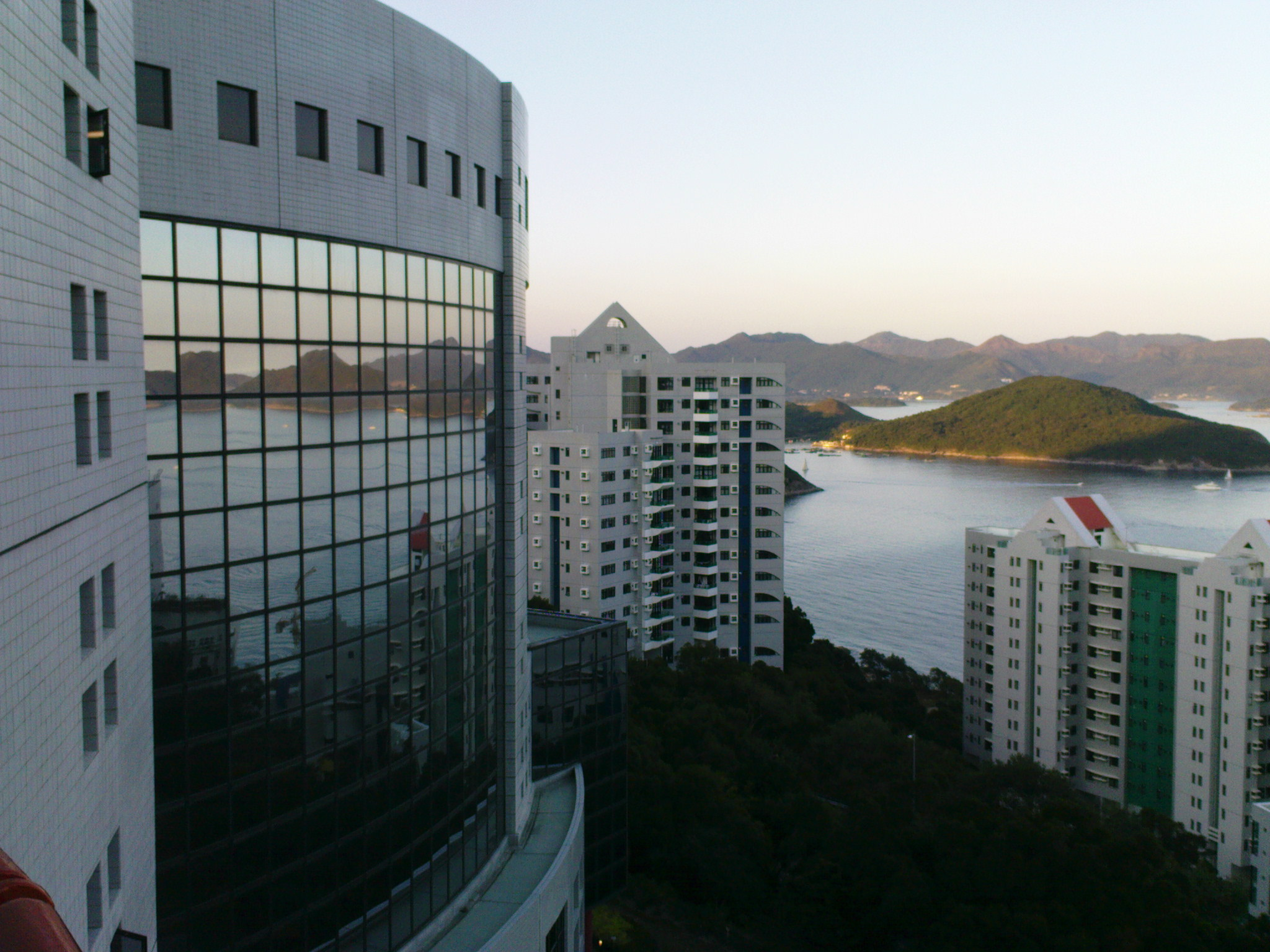
- 22.338°N 114.264°E
- Location: Clear Water Bay, the New Territories, Hong Kong
- Type: Academic Library
- Established: 1991

Collection
- Size: 623,155 printed volumes; 1,882,350 electronic books; 144,142 periodical titles (print and electronic); 372 databases; 22,185 media items; 233,977 streaming media items

Other information
- Website: library.hkust.edu.hk

The Hong Kong University of Science and Technology Library is housed in the Lee Shau Kee Library, located at the Hong Kong University of Science and Technology. It has over 620,000 printed volumes, 1,800,000 in electronic format, as well as tens of thousands of e-journals, and streaming audio and video collections. A good part of its special collections, like its Antique Maps of China Collection has been digitized.

Opening its doors in 1991, David Wilson, Baron Wilson of Tillyorn who was the Governor of Hong Kong at the time, was impressed by the fact that the Library had an advanced bilingual Chinese and English online catalog. The Library rolled out the first large-scale campus-wide CD-ROM network in Asian academic libraries; and in 1993 an early Course Reserve Image system. In 1995, its CD-ROM juke-box was the largest such installation outside of the USA and it also had launched the first academic Library Web Server in Hong Kong in 1995 as well. In its first 10 years, it became a mirror site for some subscription databases, and implemented wide-scale XML-based database projects and other innovations.

Joining the Scholarly Publishing and Academic Research Coalition (SPARC) in 1999 it has also been a long-time promoter of open access. It launched the first Institutional Repository in Hong Kong in 2003 and members of the library's Reference team worked to promote it among faculty members.

From 2011 through 2012 the Library built an extension of 1,800 square meters and renovated an existing 1,800 sq.m. into a Learning Commons. The HKUST Learning Commons provides ~600 seats and has 5 zones: Group Study, Open Study, Refreshment, Teaching, and The Creative Media Zone.

The Library and its staff were active in supporting the university in the University Grants Committee (Hong Kong)'s Hong Kong Research Assessment Exercise of 2014. In 2014, it launched the first WhatsApp service in Hong Kong academic library.

HKUST Library is a member of the Joint University Librarians Advisory Committee, which is a consortium of the libraries of the eight universities funded by the University Grants Committee. In 2014, the new Hong Kong JULAC Common Library Card was launched. 2014 also saw the launch of the large system-wide JULAC Shared ILS Project, which officially lasted from May 2014 through July 2017. The front-end of the new ILS at HKUST is called PowerSearch. HKUST Library systems staff have worked to use the capabilities of both Alma and Primo to create "Knowledge Cards", which aims to enhance discovery via bibliographic linked data

HKUST Library focuses on staff training and development and developing leadership.

The Library now has a Dataverse based research data repository and management service known as DataSpace@HKUST.
