= Spring City 66 =

Supertall skyscraper in Kunming, Yunnan, China

Coordinates: 25.04°N 102.72°E

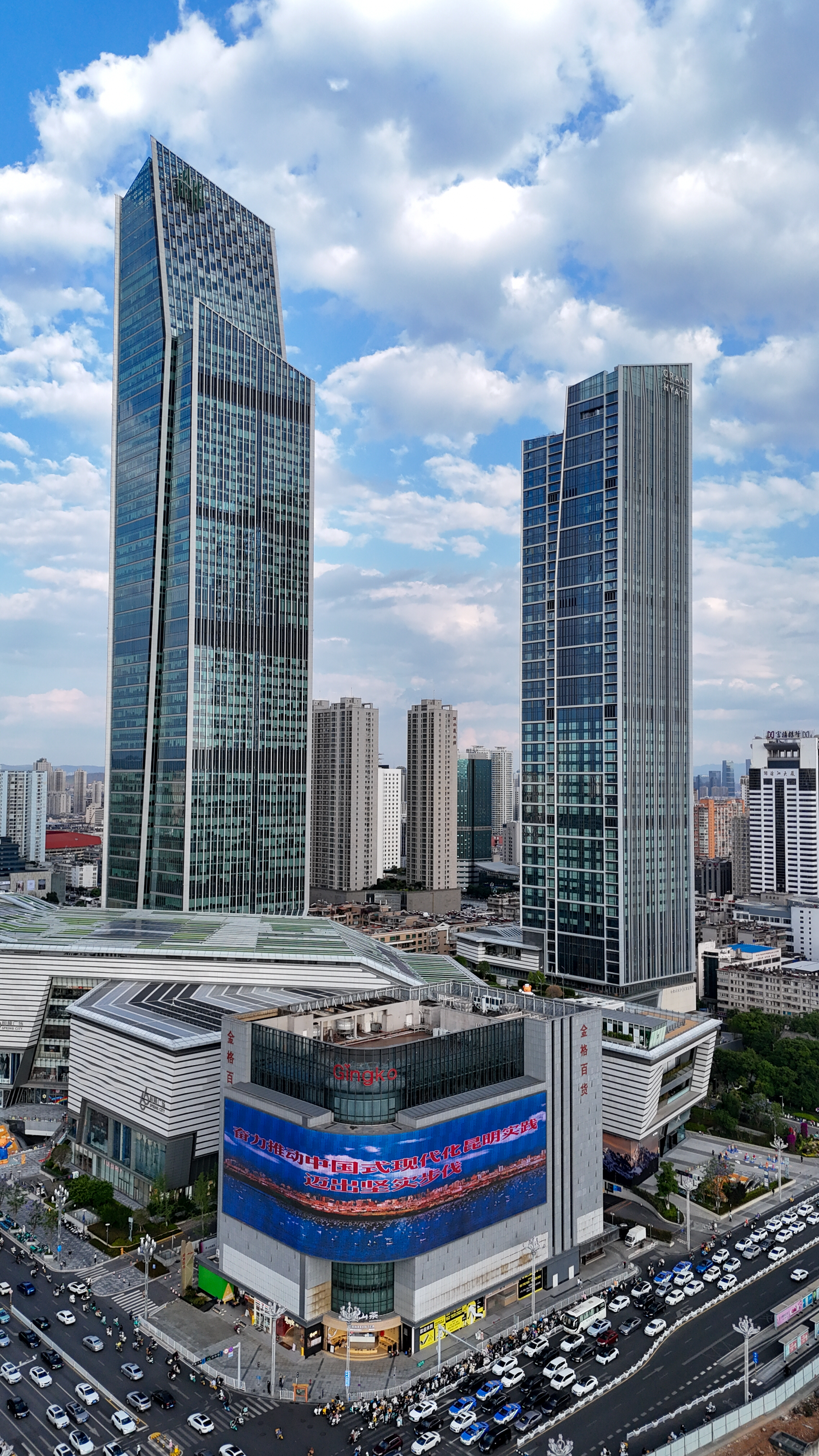
- Spring City 66 in May 2025
- Interactive map of the Spring City 66 area

General information
- Status: Completed
- Location: Kunming, Yunnan, China
- Groundbreaking: 2013
- Construction started: April 13, 2014
- Completed: November 28, 2019

Height
- Architectural: 349 metres (1,145.0 ft)

Technical details
- Floor count: 61

Spring City 66 is a complex of two skyscrapers and a shopping center in Kunming, Yunnan, China. The skyscrapers are 349 metres (1,145.0 ft) and 250 metres (820.2 ft) tall. Construction started in 2013 and completed in 2019. The complex is also known as Hang Lung Plaza, Kunming (Chinese: 恒隆广场 ‧ 昆明; pinyin: Hénglóng guǎngchǎng‧ kūnmíng). Hang Lung Properties are the developers of the project.

== See also ==
- List of tallest buildings in China
