= Plaza 66 =

Skyscraper complex in Shanghai, China

- 上海恒隆广场
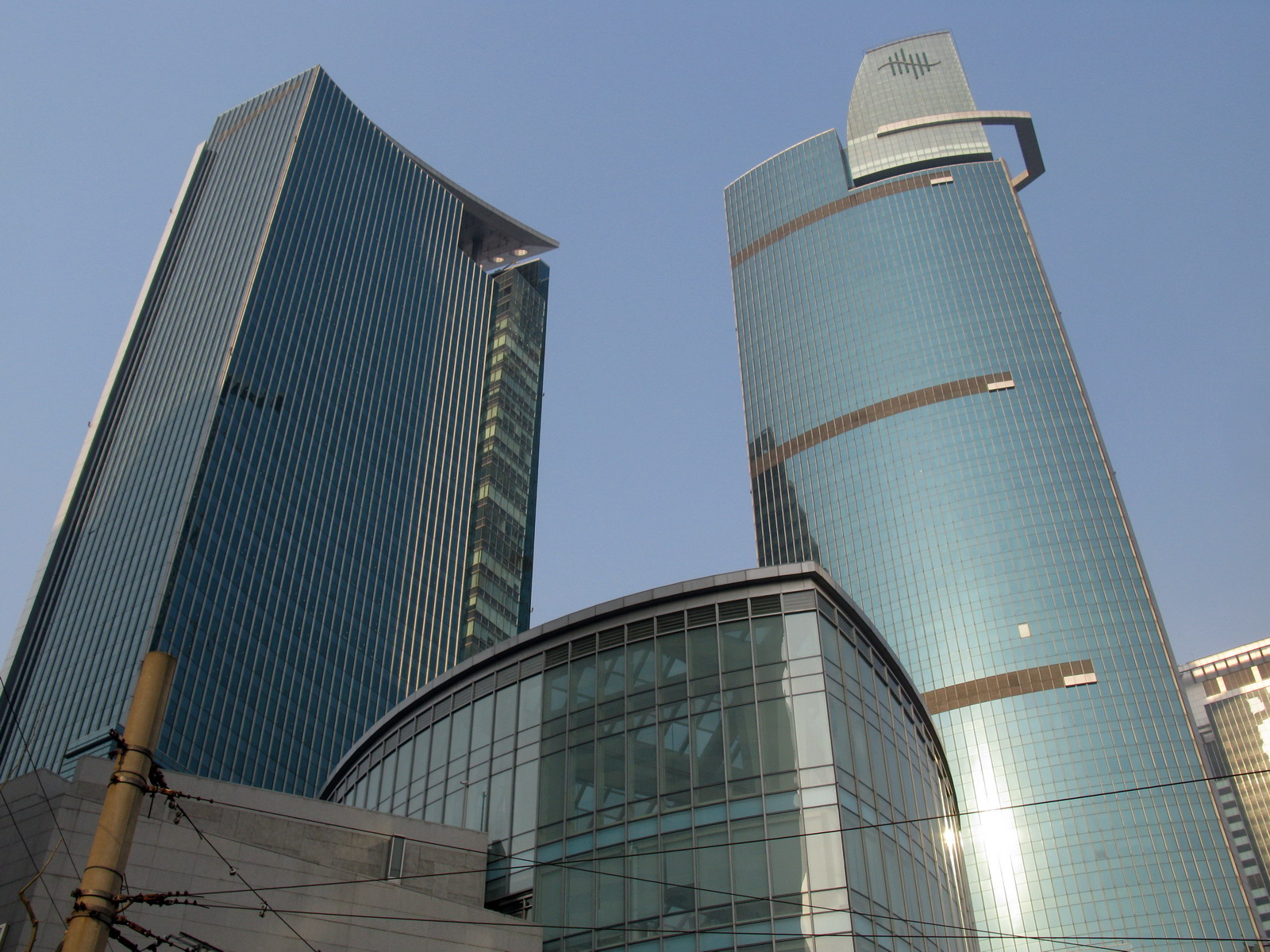
- Tower 1 (right) and Tower 2 (left)
- Interactive map of the Plaza 66 area

General information
- Type: Office, retail
- Location: Jing'an District, Shanghai, China
- Coordinates: 31.23°N 121.449°E
- Completed: Tower 1: 2002; Tower 2: 2006
- Cost: US$320 million

Height
- Antenna spire: Tower 1: 288.2 m (946 ft); Tower 2: 228 m (748 ft)
- Top floor: Tower 1: 247.5 m (812 ft)

Technical details
- Floor count: Tower 1: 66; Tower 2: 48
- Floor area: 140,263 m^{2} (1,509,780 sq ft)
- Lifts/elevators: Tower 1: 19

Design and construction
- Architects: East China Architectural Design & Research Institute Co. Ltd., Frank C. Y. Feng Architects & Associates, Kohn Pedersen Fox Associates PC
- Structural engineer: Thornton Tomasetti, Flack & Kurtz Consulting Engineers
- Main contractor: Shanghai Construction Group

Plaza 66 (Chinese: 上海恒隆广场) is a commercial and office complex in Shanghai, consisting of a shopping mall and two skyscrapers. The shopping mall has 5 levels with a total area of over 50,000 square metres. The first tower is 288 metres (945 ft) high and was completed in 2001, while the second is 228 metres (748 ft) high and was completed in 2006.

The first tower is currently the 7th tallest skyscraper in Shanghai and the fourth tallest building in the Puxi area. It is located at 1266 Nanjing Road West and has 66 floors. The project was developed by Hang Lung Properties of Hong Kong, led by Ronnie Chan. The buildings were designed by Kohn Pedersen Fox (KPF) architects from New York. The lead designer for KPF was James von Klemperer and the manager in charge of the project was Paul Katz. The building got third most votes in the 2001 Emporis Skyscraper Award selection.

== Introduction ==
Plaza 66 is an office building and integrated commercial complex in Shanghai, China. The building has 66 floors, which is why it was named Plaza 66. There is a department store from the first floor to the fifth floor containing high-end brands. Many fashion brands have chosen this department store as the location for their flagship stores in Shanghai. They include Louis Vuitton, Hermes, Cartier, Chanel, Dior, Celine, Escada, Bvlgari, Fendi, Loewe, Prada, Versace and Lanvin.

The building was up until 2010 the location for M2, one of the most famous nightclubs in Shanghai. M2 was relocated to another location the same year.

== Images ==
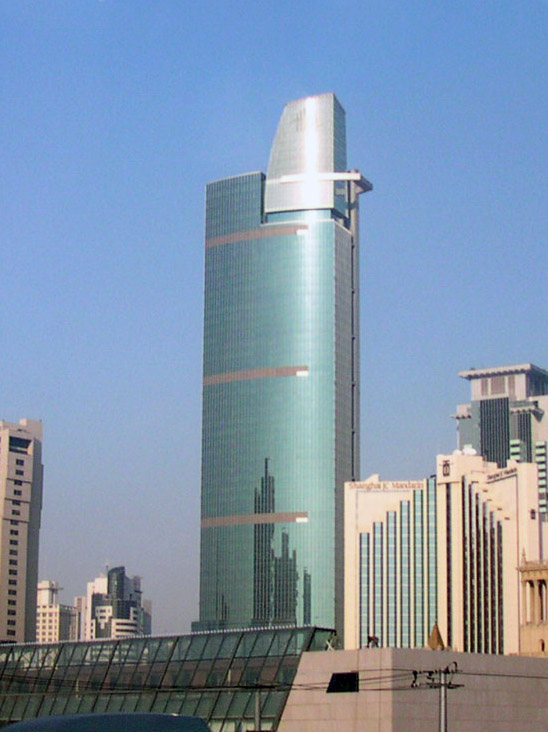
Tower One in 2004

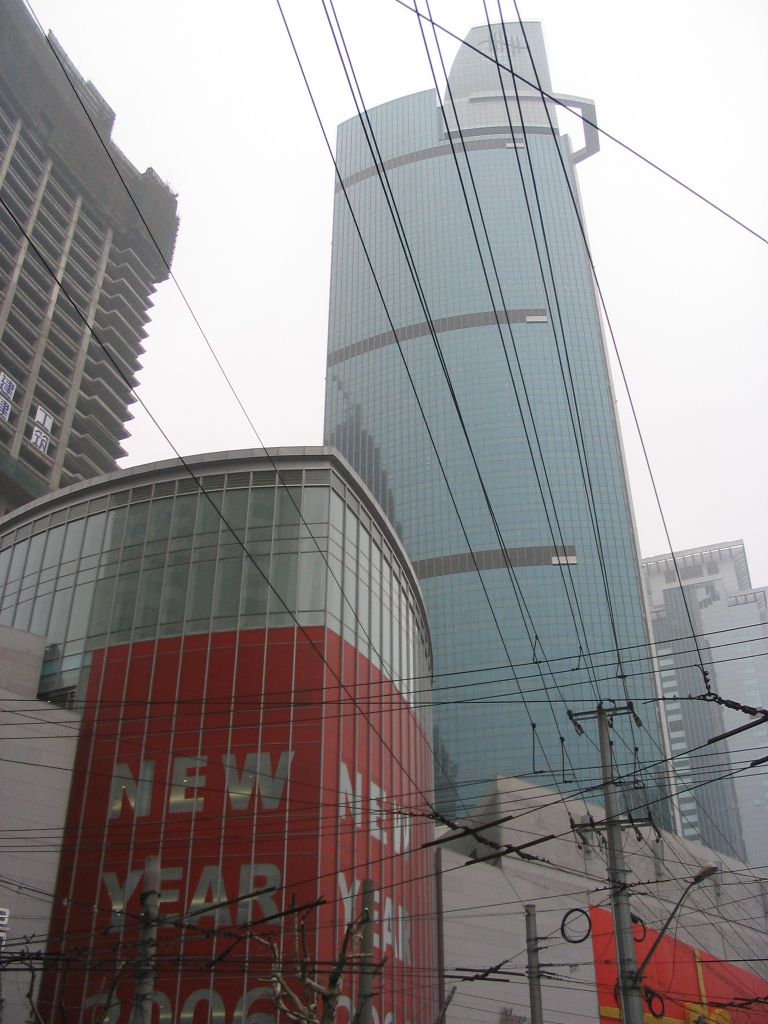
Tower One viewed from the street

== See also ==
- List of tallest buildings in Shanghai
