= Victoria Grace =

New Zealand emeritus professor of sociology

- Born: 4 December 1953

Academic background
- Education: University of Otago, University of Waikato, University of Canterbury

Academic work
- Institutions: University of Canterbury

Victoria Marion Grace is a New Zealand academic, and is professor emeritus at the University of Canterbury. Grace's research is on the sociology of health and medicine, critical and feminist theory, and the work of Jean Baudrillard.

== Academic career ==
Grace completed a Bachelor of Arts in English at the University of Otago, a Master of Social Science and Diploma of Psychology at the University of Waikato, and then returned to Canterbury for a PhD in Sociology, which she completed in 1989. After three years lecturing in Sociology at Massey University, Grace then joined the faculty of Arts at the University of Canterbury (Gender Studies, then Sociology), rising to full professor. She was appointed professor emeritus in 2016.

Grace's research is on the sociology and psychosocial study of health and medicine. Her long-running interdisciplinary research programme on chronic pain in women focusses especially on women's experiences of pelvic pain, but also includes research on chronic fatigue, the impact of pharmaceuticals such as Viagra on women, medical visualisation technology, and issues around in vitro fertilisation and donor insemination.

Grace's research is equally in the field of critical and feminist theory, known internationally for her analysis of Baudrillard's challenge to feminist thought and activism, the implications of his contribution for a critique of contemporary shifts in the construction of what is considered to be 'real', and most recently to engage a sustained critique of Lacanian psychoanalysis as a theoretical field and clinical practice.

Grace received research funding from the Health Research Council, and Marsden grants. In 2011, Marsden-funded research led by Grace and Gerald Midgley (of ESR and the University of Hull), examined the different understandings of DNA evidence, probability and certainty across parties in the legal system, e.g. professional participants such police detectives and Crown prosecutors, and lay members of the public who would participate as jury members.

== Selected works ==
=== Books ===
- Victoria Grace. Baudrillard’s Challenge, A Feminist Reading (2000) Routledge. ISBN 9780415180764
- Victoria Grace, Heather Worth, Laurence Simmons. Baudrillard West of the Dateline (2003) Dunmore Press, Palmerston North. ISBN 0864694377
- Victoria Grace. Victims, Gender and Jouissance (2012) Routledge Research in Gender and Society, Routledge. ISBN 0415806186
- Victoria Grace, Gerald Midgley, Johanna Veth, Annabel Ahuriri-Driscoll. (2011) Forensic DNA Evidence on Trial. Science and Uncertainty in the Courtroom. Chicago: Emergent Publications. ISBN 9780984216543
- Renée J Heberle, and Victoria Grace (editors). Theorizing Sexual Violence. (2011) Routledge Research in Gender and Society, Routledge. ISBN 978-0415898539
- Victoria Grace. Baudrillard and Lacanian Psychoanalysis (2022) Routledge Advances in Sociology. Routledge. ISBN 978-0367635565

=== Journal articles ===
- Grace, Victoria; Zondervan, Krina (2004). "Chronic pelvic pain in New Zealand: prevalence, pain severity, diagnoses and use of the health services". Australian and New Zealand Journal of Public Health. 28 (4): 369–375. doi:10.1111/j.1467-842x.2004.tb00446.x. PMID 15704703. Wikidata Q57611354.
- Grace, Victoria; Zondervan, Krina (2006). "Chronic pelvic pain in women in New Zealand: comparative well-being, comorbidity, and impact on work and other activities". Health Care for Women International. 27 (7): 585–599. doi:10.1080/07399330600803725. PMID 16844672. Wikidata Q48495043.
- Potts, Annie; Gavey, Nicola; Grace, Victoria; Tiina Vares (2003). "The downside of Viagra: women's experiences and concerns". Sociology of Health and Illness. 25 (7): 697–719. doi:10.1046/j.1467-9566.2003.00366.x. PMID 19774744. Wikidata Q43272615.
- Ken Daniels; Wayne Gillett; Grace, Victoria (2009). "Parental information sharing with donor insemination conceived offspring: a follow-up study". Human Reproduction. 24 (5): 1099–1105. doi:10.1093/humrep/den495. PMID 19164306. Wikidata Q42610012.
- Hart B; Grace, Victoria (2000). "Fatigue in chronic fatigue syndrome: a discourse analysis of women's experiential narratives". Health Care for Women International. 21 (3): 187–201. doi:10.1080/073993300245258. PMID 11111465. Wikidata Q53330282.
- Grace, Victoria; Ken R Daniels; Wayne Gillett (2007). "The donor, the father, and the imaginary constitution of the family: parents' constructions in the case of donor insemination". Social Science & Medicine. 66 (2): 301–314. doi:10.1016/j.socscimed.2007.08.029. PMID 17928116. Wikidata Q53227514.
- Potts, Annie; Grace, Victoria; Tiina Vares; Gavey, Nicola (2006). "'Sex for life'? Men's counter-stories on 'erectile dysfunction', male sexuality and ageing". Sociology of Health and Illness. 28 (3): 306–329. doi:10.1111/j.1467-9566.2006.00494.x. PMID 16573718. Wikidata Q47215244.
