= Stacey Missmer =

American reproductive biologist

- Education: Lehigh University; Harvard University
- Scientific career
- Workplaces: Michigan State University; Harvard Medical School
- Thesis: The epidemiology of endometriosis : a prospective investigation in U.S. women (2003)

Stacey Ann Missmer is an American reproductive biologist who is a professor at Michigan State University. She was the first faculty member to be appointed under the Michigan State University Global Health Initiative. Her research considers physical and environmental risk factors for endometriosis and infertility.

== Early life and education ==
Missmer was an undergraduate student in biology at Lehigh University. She moved to Harvard University as a graduate student, where she worked toward a doctorate in epidemiology. She joined the Nurses' Health Study at Harvard in 1998, and was the group's senior endometriosis researcher. In 2003, Missmer was appointed to the teaching faculty at Harvard.

== Research and career ==
Missmer was promoted to assistant professor at the Harvard Medical School in 2006, and Associate Professor six years later. She joined the International Endogene Consortium in 2007, working with Krina Zondervan on a genome-wide association study of endometriosis. She served as lead of Harvard's Reproductive, Perinatal and Pediatric Epidemiology group and Director of Epidemiologic Research. Missmer was the co-founder of the Boston Center for Endometriosis, where she oversees the Women's Health Study. She joined the Board of Directors of the World Endometriosis Research Foundation in 2014.

Missmer's research makes use of precision medicine to identify the risk factors for endometriosis in women and girls. She identified variations in the incidence of endometriosis associated with body size, exercise and dietary intake. Her research has indicated that women and girls who suffer from endometriosis may be at risk of autoimmune disease. Alongside her work on endometriosis, Missmer investigates predictors of infertility. In a study involving almost 3000 couples undergoing IVF, Missmer explored predictors of IVF outcomes.

Missmer moved to Michigan State University in 2016, where she became the first faculty member to be recruited to the Global Impact Initiative.

== Selected publications ==
- Walter F O Marasas; Ronald T Riley; Katherine A Hendricks; et al. (April 1, 2004). "Fumonisins disrupt sphingolipid metabolism, folate transport, and neural tube development in embryo culture and in vivo: a potential risk factor for human neural tube defects among populations consuming fumonisin-contaminated maize". Journal of Nutrition. 134 (4): 711–716. doi:10.1093/jn/134.4.711. ISSN 0022-3166. PMID 15051815. Wikidata Q35723008.
- Stacey A Missmer; Daniel W Cramer (March 1, 2003). "The epidemiology of endometriosis". Obstetrics and Gynecology Clinics of North America. 30 (1): 1–19, vii. doi:10.1016/s0889-8545(02)00050-5. ISSN 0889-8545. PMID 12699255. Wikidata Q35108912.
- Stacey A Missmer; A Heather Eliassen; Robert L Barbieri; Susan E Hankinson (December 1, 2004). "Endogenous estrogen, androgen, and progesterone concentrations and breast cancer risk among postmenopausal women". Journal of the National Cancer Institute. 96 (24): 1856–1865. doi:10.1093/jnci/djh336. ISSN 0027-8874. PMID 15601642. Wikidata Q45188730.
