= Harvard Six Cities study =

Air pollution study

The Harvard "Six Cities" study was a major epidemiological study of over 8,000 adults in six American cities that helped to establish the connection between fine-particulate air pollution (such as diesel engine soot) and reduced life expectancy ("excess mortality"). Widely acknowledged as a landmark piece of public health research, it was initiated by Benjamin G. Ferris, Jr at Harvard School of Public Health and carried out by Harvard's Douglas Dockery, C. Arden Pope of Brigham Young University, Ferris himself, Frank E. Speizer, and four other collaborators, and published in the New England Journal of Medicine in 1993. Following a lawsuit by The American Lung Association, the study, and its various follow-ups, led to a tightening of pollution standards by the US Environmental Protection Agency. This prompted an intense backlash from industry groups in the late 1990s, culminating in a Supreme Court case, in what Science magazine termed "the biggest environmental fight of the decade".

== Background ==
The Six Cities study was born in the wake of the 1970s energy crisis amid growing concerns that a squeeze on oil supply would lead to greater use of low-quality coal and, therefore, higher mortality from air pollution. The harmful health effects of burning coal had already come to light following the 1952 Great London Smog (in the United Kingdom), the 1948 Donora tragedy (in the United States), and other major pollution episodes, but it was unclear which part of coal pollution (sulphur dioxide, particulates, or some combination of these and other emissions) was of most concern. There were also differences of scientific opinion about how particulates affected human health, which types were most harmful, and whether there were impacts even at low to moderate levels of exposure. The Harvard Six Cities study aimed to address some of these questions.

As it acknowledged in its introduction, it built on a number of earlier studies that had found "associations between mortality rates and particulate air pollution in U.S. metropolitan areas", including a 1970 Science paper "Air Pollution and Human Health" by Lester Lave and Eugene Seskin of Carnegie Mellon University. Crucially, unlike the earlier studies, which were generally cross-sectional in design (statistical snapshots of large, anonymous populations taken at arbitrary times), the Harvard Six Cities was a cohort study that tracked the same people over their lives, so allowing risk factors such as age, sex, and smoking history to be eliminated, and the effects of air pollution to be studied in isolation.

== Methodology ==
Dockery and colleagues studied a cohort of 8,111 adults living in six American cities "selected as representative of the range of particulate air pollution in the United States": Harriman, Tennessee; Portage, Wisconsin; St Louis, Missouri; Steubenville, Ohio; Topeka, Kansas and Watertown, Massachusetts. Over a decade and a half, each person was questioned on such things as their medical history and lifestyle (including whether and how much they smoked, their body mass index, their education level, average age, and so on). This data was compared with ambient air pollution measurements from the six cities and mortality data from the National Death Index.

== Conclusion ==
The study found that people living in the most polluted city (Steubenville) were 26 percent more likely to die than those in the least polluted city (Portage), suggesting an association between particulate pollution and higher death rates in urban areas: "Although the effects of other, unmeasured risk factors cannot be excluded with certainty, these results suggest that fine-particulate air pollution, or a more complex pollution mixture associated with fine particulate matter, contributes to excess mortality in certain U.S. cities."

== Confirmation ==
The Six Cities study was followed (and its findings effectively confirmed) by a much bigger epidemiological project, generally referred to as the American Cancer Society (ACS) study, which was carried out by three authors of the original study (Pope, Dockery, and Frank E. Speizer) and four other collaborators. The ACS study correlated air pollution data, lifestyle factors, and death records for a sample of 552,138 adults in 151 urban areas followed over a 16-year period and concluded, just as the original had done, that breathing particulate pollution increases a person's risk of death: "Particulate air pollution was associated with cardiopulmonary and lung cancer mortality but not with mortality due to other causes. Increased mortality is associated with sulfate and fine particulate air pollution at levels commonly found in U.S. cities." A variety of similar epidemiological studies have also supported the association between fine particulate pollution and higher mortality. Crucially, a 2006 paper by Francine Laden and members of the original Harvard team (Frank Speizer and Douglas Dockery) also confirmed the opposite effect: reductions in particulate pollution save lives.

== Impact ==
Following the publication of the Six Cities and ACS studies, there were new calls for tougher pollution standards in the United States, and The American Lung Association ultimately sued the US Environmental Protection Agency to bring that about. As a result, in 1997, the EPA introduced the National Ambient Air Quality Standards (NAAQS) with new limits on particulates. This, in turn, prompted pushback from industry groups and various legal challenges, including a request to release data from the original studies for scrutiny by third parties. Medical confidentiality agreements prevented this, so, as a compromise, the studies were independently re-analyzed by Daniel Krewski, Richard Burnett, and colleagues on behalf of the Health Effects Institute, which used different statistical methods but essentially confirmed the original findings.

The legal challenges were eventually settled by a Supreme Court ruling on February 27, 2001 (Whitman v. American Trucking Associations, S.Ct. No. 99-1257) that unanimously sided with the EPA. Since then, largely as a result of the initial Six Cities and ACS studies, and the follow-up research they inspired, air quality standards and guidelines for particulate pollution have been introduced throughout the world - potentially saving many millions of lives. According to air pollution scientist Gary Fuller: "It is hard to overstate the impact of the Six Cities study on global health... the results still offer the best estimate for how much our lives are shortened by the particle pollution that we breathe."

=== Proposed EPA "Honest Act" ===
When then-EPA director, Scott Pruitt, announced his proposed scientific research policy requiring full transparency of all studies that inform public environmental policies, this would have excluded studies, such as the Six Cities studies, because they used confidential data in personal medical reports that could not be made openly available. Critics of Pruitt's policy traced its roots to the Harvard Six Cities study. Various iterations of the bill have been supported by American Chemistry Council, an organization that advises DuPont and Monsanto, among others. It has also been supported by Koch Industries, Peabody Energy, and ExxonMobil. According to the American Association for the Advancement of Science, some within the chemical, manufacturing and energy sector did not approve of the clean air regulations that were implemented because of the Six Cities studies, so they are trying to "attack the science underlying the regulation". The "demand for transparency" was in reality a way to "undermine scientific independence." The Honest and Open New E.P.A. Science Treatment Act, which was sponsored by Lamar Smith (R-Texas) provided the basis for Pruitt's plans for transparency in science policy that he announced on The Daily Caller in March 2018.
