= Francine Laden =

American epidemiologist and academic

- Education: Harvard University
- Scientific career
- Fields: Environmental epidemiology Chronic diseases
- Workplaces: Harvard T.H. Chan School of Public Health
- Thesis: Environmental risk factors and breast cancer (1998)
- Website: www.hsph.harvard.edu/francine-laden

Francine Laden is an American epidemiologist who is Professor of Environmental Epidemiology at the Harvard T.H. Chan School of Public Health. Her research has investigated the environmental epidemiology of chronic disease. She serves as co-director of the Harvard University and Boston University center for research on environmental and social stressors in housing across the life course. Laden has also served on the United States Environmental Protection Agency advisory board.

== Early life and education ==
Laden was an undergraduate at Princeton University and graduate student at the Harvard T.H. Chan School of Public Health. Her doctoral research looked for environmental risk factors for breast cancer. At the time, the incidence of breast cancer was rising in the United States, and Laden wondered whether specific exposures/environments made people more susceptible to the disease. Whilst her results were inconclusive, they did not indicate environmental risk factors played a considerable role in the disease. She went on to show that long-term rotating night shift work was associated with a higher incidence of breast cancer, and that women who did shiftwork younger were more at risk. In 2007, the World Health Organization classified night shift work as a probable carcinogen.

== Research and career ==
Laden studies the epidemiology of chronic disease. She has studied how air pollution, persistent organic pollutants and second hand smoke can impact human health, and how risk is distributed across America. Laden has studied the environmental risk factors of various cancers, including breast cancer, lung cancer and non-Hodgkin's lymphoma. She has studied how diesel exhaust exposure impacts lung cancer mortality in America's trucking industry. Alongside cancer, Laden showed that exposure to particulate matter was associated with high levels of anxiety.

By combining satellite imagery (the normalized difference vegetation index), physical examinations and cognitive tests, Laden research showed that access to urban green space could improve processing speed, attention span and cognitive function. She showed that a lack of access to green space was associated to with higher incidences of depression. By combining the imagery with medical records, she hypothesised that women who live in areas with high levels of outdoor lighting are at greater risk for breast cancer that those in areas with lower light levels. She hypothesised that this was due to a reduction in melatonin, which disrupts circadian rhythms.

Almost half of American adults suffer from hypertension. Whilst diet, obesity and level of physical activity contribute to risk, it was unclear how environmental exposures impact risk. She based her research on young people enrolled on the Growing Up Today Study, and included data on chemical stressors, physical stressors and features of the built environment. Her research has shown that exposure to aircraft noise (i.e. living near an airport) increased the risk of hypertension.

In 2021 Laden was made President of the International Society for Environmental Epidemiology. Under her leadership, the International Society for Environmental Epidemiology developed its North American community.

=== Publications ===
- Eva S Schernhammer; Francine Laden; Frank E Speizer; Walter C Willett; David J Hunter; Ichiro Kawachi; Charles S Fuchs; Graham A Colditz (June 1, 2003). "Night-shift work and risk of colorectal cancer in the nurses' health study". Journal of the National Cancer Institute. 95 (11): 825–828. doi:10.1093/jnci/95.11.825. ISSN 0027-8874. PMID 12783938. Wikidata Q34202626.
- Sarah P Megdal; Candyce H Kroenke; Francine Laden; Eero Pukkala; Eva S Schernhammer (September 1, 2005). "Night work and breast cancer risk: a systematic review and meta-analysis". European Journal of Cancer. 41 (13): 2023–2032. doi:10.1016/j.ejca.2005.05.010. ISSN 0959-8049. PMID 16084719. Wikidata Q33989213.
- Laden F; Schwartz J; Speizer FE; Dockery DW (March 15, 2006). "Reduction in fine particulate air pollution and mortality: Extended follow-up of the Harvard Six Cities study". American Journal of Respiratory and Critical Care Medicine. 173 (6): 667–72. doi:10.1164/rccm.200503-443oc. ISSN 1073-449X. PMC 2662950. PMID 16424447. Wikidata Q29615383.
