= Charles Fuchs =

Charles Fuchs may refer to:

- Charles Fuchs (lithographer) (1803–1874), German lithographer and photographer
- Charles S. Fuchs, American oncologist
- Charlie Fuchs (1913–1969), American Major League Baseball pitcher
