= Houdini (disambiguation) =

Harry Houdini (1874–1926) was a magician and escape artist.

Houdini may also refer to:

== People ==
- Bess Houdini (1876–1943), Harry Houdini's stage assistant and wife
- Wilmoth Houdini (1895–1973), calypso musician
- Houdini (rapper) (1998–2020), Canadian rapper

== Film and television biographies ==
- Houdini (1953 film)
- Houdini (1998 film)
- Houdini (miniseries), 2014
- The Great Houdini (film), 1976

== Music ==
=== Albums ===
- Houdini (album), by the Melvins, 1993

=== Songs ===
- "Houdini" (Dua Lipa song), 2023
- "Houdini" (Eminem song), 2024
- "Houdini" (Foster the People song), 2011
- "Houdini" (KSI song), 2020
- "Harry Houdini" (song), by Kon Kan, 1988
- "Houdini", by Death Grips from Bottomless Pit, 2016
- "Houdini", by Kate Bush from The Dreaming, 1982
- "Houdini", by Walter Brennan, 1962
- "The Great Houdini", by New Found Glory from Sticks and Stones, 2002

== Other uses ==
- Houdini (sailboat), a New Zealand sailboat design
- Houdini (software), a high-end 3D animation package
- Houdini (chess), a chess engine for Windows
- Houdini (Meerkat Manor), a meerkat in the documentary series
- Houdini (play), 2014, about the Brothers Houdini
- Houdini Needles, a mountain in Canada

== See also ==
- Whodini, an American hip hop trio
- Houdina Radio Control, a 1920s US driverless car firm
