= Benjamin Ferris (physician) =

American physician (1919–1996)

Benjamin Greeley Ferris, Jr.
- Born: 24 January 1919; Watertown, Massachusetts, United States
- Died: 1 August 1996 (aged 77)
- Education: Harvard University
- Known for: Harvard Six Cities study
- Awards: American Thoracic Society Distinguished Achievement Award
- Scientific career
- Fields: Respiratory medicine; Epidemiology
- Workplaces: Harvard T.H. Chan School of Public Health

Benjamin Greeley Ferris, Jr. (24 January 1919 – 1 August 1996) was an American physician and epidemiologist, a professor at Harvard School of Public Health who helped to pioneer statistical studies into the health effects of air pollution in the United States in the 1960s and 1970s.

In the early 1960s, Ferris and colleague Donald O. Anderson carried out the first large-scale statistical study in the United States linking cigarette smoking to respiratory disease. In 1973, Ferris and Frank E. Speizer launched a statistical study comparing air pollution in six urban areas of the United States. This became the Harvard Six Cities study, a landmark piece of public health research that helped to prove the link between fine-particulate air pollution and higher death rates when it was published in 1993.

== Early life ==
Ben Greeley Ferris, a distant relative of polar explorer Adolphus Greely, was born in Watertown, Massachusetts in 1919 to parents General Benjamin Greeley Ferris, Sr. and Margaret Ferris (Wright). After studying at Choate Academy, he graduated from Harvard University (1940) and Harvard Medical School (1943), before training in pediatrics at Boston Children's Hospital. Between 1945 and 1947, he served as a lieutenant in the US Army and in the US Marine Corps.

== Scientific career ==
Ferris' first few scientific papers, all concerning heat exchange and blood flow in the human hand, were published in 1946, and he returned to Harvard School of Public Health as a research fellow in physiology in 1948. Numerous papers on respiratory function and pulmonary disease followed between the late-1940s and mid-1950s, including several studies of poliomyelitis with Harvard colleague James Whittenberger. Ferris was made an associate professor in 1958, and a tenured professor of public health in 1971; in parallel, he served as Harvard University's professor of environmental health and safety from 1957 until his retirement in 1989.

Ferris divided air pollution into three broad types: ambient atmospheric pollution; pollution caused by occupational exposure; and what he called "personal atmospheric pollution", caused mostly by cigarette smoking. Over his four-decade research career, he explored the links between all three types of pollution and respiratory disease.

=== Health effects of smoking ===
In the early 1960s, working with Donald Anderson of the University of British Columbia, Ferris began studying the health effects of smoking. Building on epidemiological work carried out by Richard Doll and Austin Bradford Hill in the UK, Ferris and Anderson carried out the first large-scale statistical study in the United States linking smoking to chronic respiratory disease. The study, published in The New England Journal of Medicine in 1962, showed that the heaviest smokers had 4.4 times the risk of developing chronic respiratory disease compared to nonsmokers. It prompted an editorial comment that "A concerted effort by physicians to alert the public to the nature and dimensions of the dangers of smoking would appear to be overdue". That happened dramatically in January 1964, when the major report Smoking and Health was published by the United States Surgeon General, concluding: "Cigarette smoking is a health hazard of sufficient importance in the United States to warrant appropriate remedial action"; the study by Ferris and Anderson was among those it cited.

=== Air pollution in the environment ===
Ferris and Donald Anderson carried out a number of other "community" studies using an approach pioneered by the British researchers, which combined interview questionnaires with simple tests of lung function. One of the advantages of this method was that it allowed researchers to compare diseases across occupations, different geographic areas, or both. Thanks to this standardized approach, Ferris and Anderson were able to compare respiratory symptoms of smokers with those of workers exposed to air pollution, so concluding "any study that attempts to assess the effect of an air pollutant must take into consideration the smoking histories of the individuals examined". Using this approach, in 1963, Ferris and Anderson were able to make comparisons between citizens of relatively polluted Berlin, New Hampshire and relatively unpolluted Chilliwack, British Columbia, where smoking was the more important form of exposure, so, effectively separating the different contributions of smoking from those of ambient air pollution. The idea of comparing people in more- or less-polluted areas would reappear in the Six Cities study.

==== Occupational exposure ====
Ferris' research into air pollution included numerous studies of how workers in different industries experienced different types of air pollution, including jute workers (in 1959), coal miners and flax workers (in 1962), movie projectionists (in 1967), and ship workers (in 1972).

In the mid-1960s, Ferris and Harvard colleague Frank E. Speizer studied chronic respiratory disease in road workers in Boston's Sumner Tunnel. It was an early study of "the effects of man on the prolonged exposure to exhaust gas". They returned to this theme in 1972, with a study of police and patrol-car officers chronically exposed to automobile exhaust.

Ferris' growing interest in the health effects of air pollution was marked by the publication of a review article titled "Air Pollution and Disease" in the journal Anesthesiology in 1964.

==== Six Cities study ====
In 1973, Ferris and Speizer, who had worked with epidemiologists Richard Doll, Richard Peto, and Charles Montague Fletcher in the UK, proposed a research project they called the Harvard Air Quality and Lung Health Study, with Ferris as its original principal investigator. This eventually became the Six Cities study: a landmark public health study comparing people living in six differently polluted urban areas that demonstrated an association between fine-particulate air pollution and "excess mortality" (higher death rates), led by Douglas Dockery, and published in The New England Journal of Medicine in 1993. Data from the Six Cities study has been used to research numerous other issues, including the effects of air pollution on lung development during childhood and adolescence and the effects of passive smoking on children's health.

==== Clean Air Act critique ====
In 1980, during the Ronald Reagan administration, Ferris co-authored a report, funded by the Business Roundtable association of 200 corporations, criticizing the Clean Air Act and urging a relaxation of stringent air quality standards in favour of a more pragmatic approach. According to Ferris, commenting on the report: "Any level of exposure may carry with it some risk, however slight, to some small fraction of the population. It is with this logic in mind that we encourage the use of the concept of acceptable risks".

=== Other studies ===
Ferris also explored the effects of industrial plants on the respiratory health of people in nearby communities, and the potential environmental hazards of electromagnetic radiation.

== Awards ==
Ferris was the first recipient of the Distinguished Achievement Award from the American Thoracic Society, which recognizes "individuals who have made outstanding major contributions... to prevention, diagnosis and treatment of lung disease, critical illness, or sleep disorders through advocacy, training, and mentorship" and "major accomplishment or cumulative impact on the field".

== Mountain climbing ==
Ferris was a keen mountaineer who took part in the first ascent of Mount Hayes, Alaska in July 1941 with Brad Washburn, the first ascent of Mount Moffit in August 1942, the first ascent of Houdini Needles in 1948, and the second ascent of Mount Saint Elias in 1946. He published two articles on mountain-climbing safety in The New England Journal of Medicine in 1963.

== Personal life ==
He was twice married, to Sarah Brooks, with whom he had five daughters, and to Stefana Puleo.

His gravestone is inscribed "I will lift up mine eyes unto the hills", a quotation from Psalm 121.

== Selected publications ==
- Anderson, Donald; Ferris, Benjamin (18 October 1962). "Role of Tobacco Smoking in the Causation of Chronic Respiratory Disease". N Engl J Med. 267 (16): 787–794. doi:10.1056/NEJM196210182671601. PMID 14012834.
- Dockery, Douglas W.; Speizer, Frank E.; Stram, Daniel O.; Ware, James H.; Spengler, John D.; Ferris, Benjamin G. (March 1989). "Effects of Inhalable Particles on Respiratory Health of Children". American Review of Respiratory Disease. 139 (3): 587–594. doi:10.1164/ajrccm/139.3.587. ISSN 0003-0805. PMID 2923355.
- Dockery, Douglas; Pope, C. Arden; Xu, Xiping; Spengler, John; Ware, James; Fay, Martha; Ferris, Benjamin; Speizer, Frank (December 9, 1993). "An Association between Air Pollution and Mortality in Six U.S. Cities". N Engl J Med. 329 (24): 1753–1759. doi:10.1056/NEJM199312093292401. PMID 8179653.
