= Wilhelm Heuer =

German lithographer (1813–1890)

Christian Ludwig Wilhelm Heuer (6 November 1813 – 15 April 1890) was a German lithographer.

== Life ==
Heuer was born during the occupation of Hamburg by the army of the French Revolution in Hamburg's Görttwiete near the Hopfenmarkt. He was the son of tailor's Johann Friedrich Heuer and Christina Magdalena, née Lehmann from Uelzen. His birth was registered in the French vital records of Hambourg under number 2738. When he was just one year old, his parents moved to a house in the Stavenpforte and later to the Altenwallstraße. The house there fell victim to the Great fire of Hamburg in 1842.

Heuer began his apprenticeship as a lithographer around 1828/1829 in the printing house of the Suhr brothers. After completing his apprenticeship, he initially worked there and only went to Vienna in the second half of the 1830s to perfect his skills. Here he also met his future wife Maria Grisenberger (* 1816), whom he married on 11 April 1837 in the parish of St. Leopold. She was a daughter of croft owner Leopold Grisenberger.

He returned to his home town with his wife immediately after the Great Fire of 1842. In the same year, Heuer began a long-lasting collaboration with a glorious lithographic institution in Hamburg, the firm of Charles Fuchs. It was there that Heuer's first major work appeared in August 1842, a panorama of the burnt Hanseatic City Hamburg, which cost 12 marks in coloured form. "Christian Wilhelm Ludwig Heuer, Lithographer" was granted Hamburg citizenship on 21 February 1845.

Afterwards, Heuer worked, among others, for the Berendsohn'sche Kunst- und Buchhandlung, for which he produced a series of "historical situation and topography pictures from the [...] history of Hamburg". They were intended for Hamburgs Gedenkbuch - eine Chronik seiner Schicksale und Begebenheiten, which was completed in 1844. In the years until 1847, 56 sheets of the Picturesque Views of Schleswig, Holstein and Lauenburg were published.

It is less known that Wilhelm Heuer made numerous lithographs for the company Johann Cesar VI. Godeffroy. He lithographed drawings and also photographs that the explorers had brought back to Hamburg from the South Seas for the Museum Godeffroy. The lithographs were published within the Journal des Museum Godeffroy between 1873 and 1881.

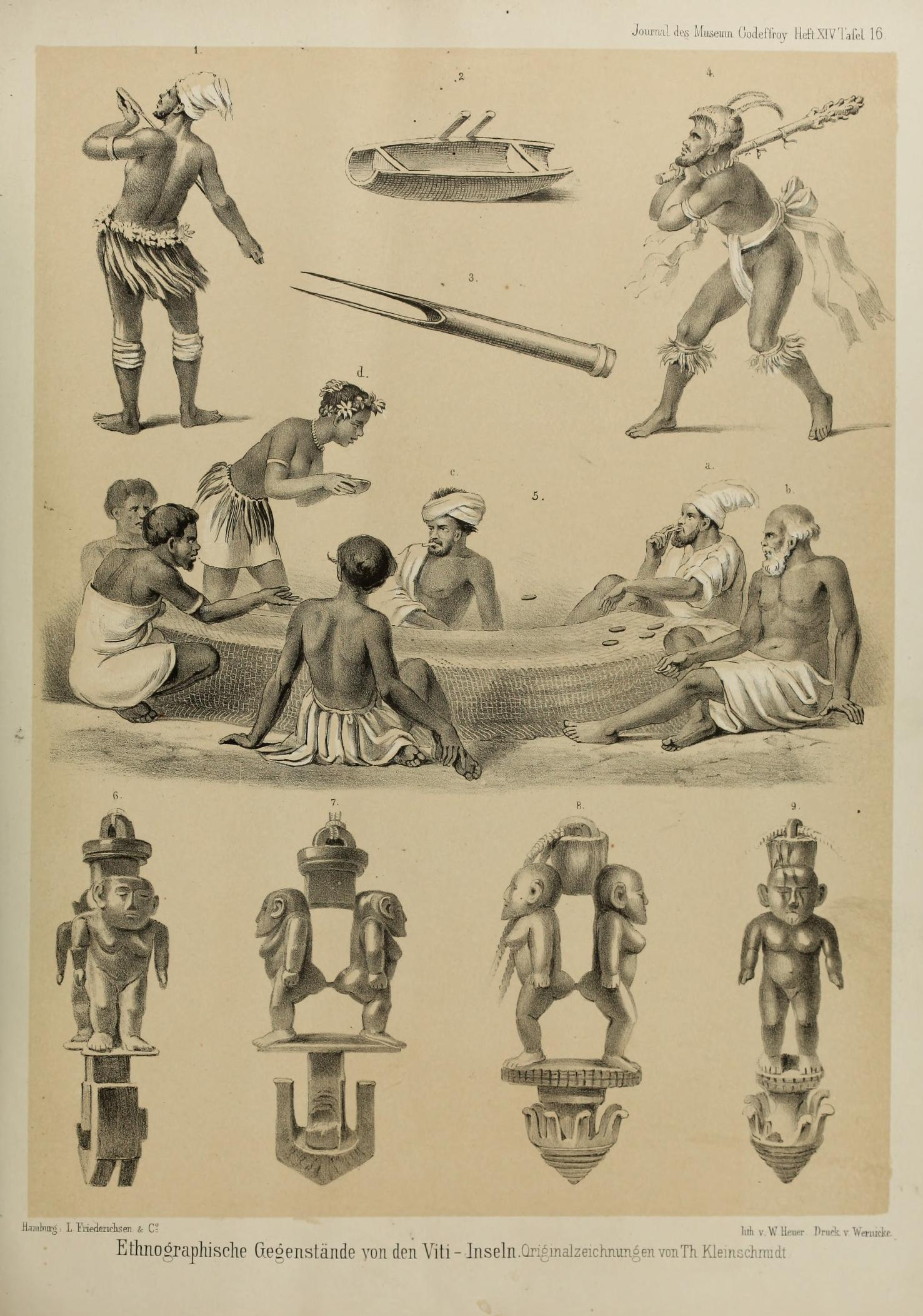
Journal des Museum Godeffroy, vol. 5, issue XIV Tafel 16 Ethnografie (drawing: Th. Kleinschmidt)

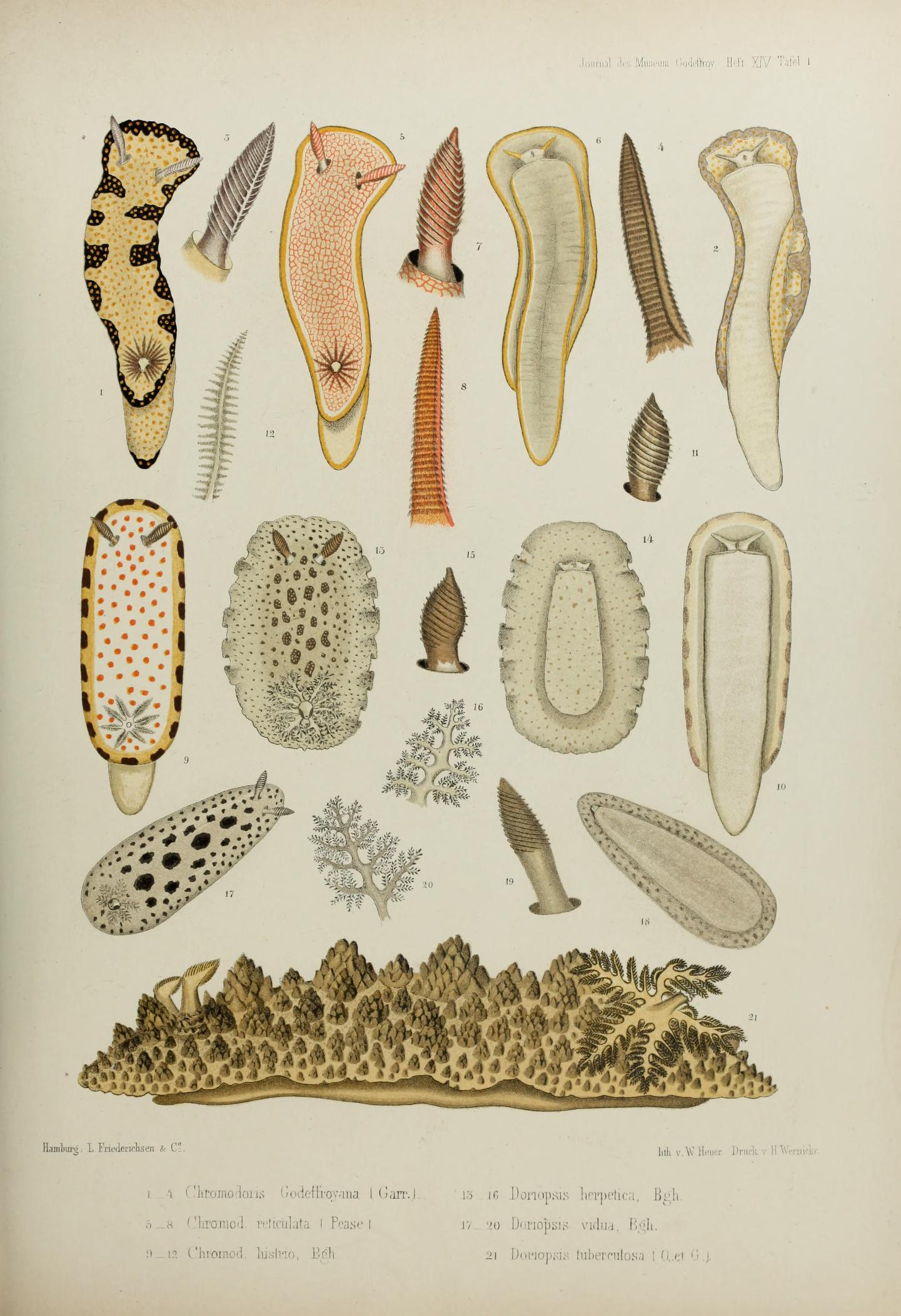
Journal des Museum Godeffroy, vol 5, issue XIV Tafel 1

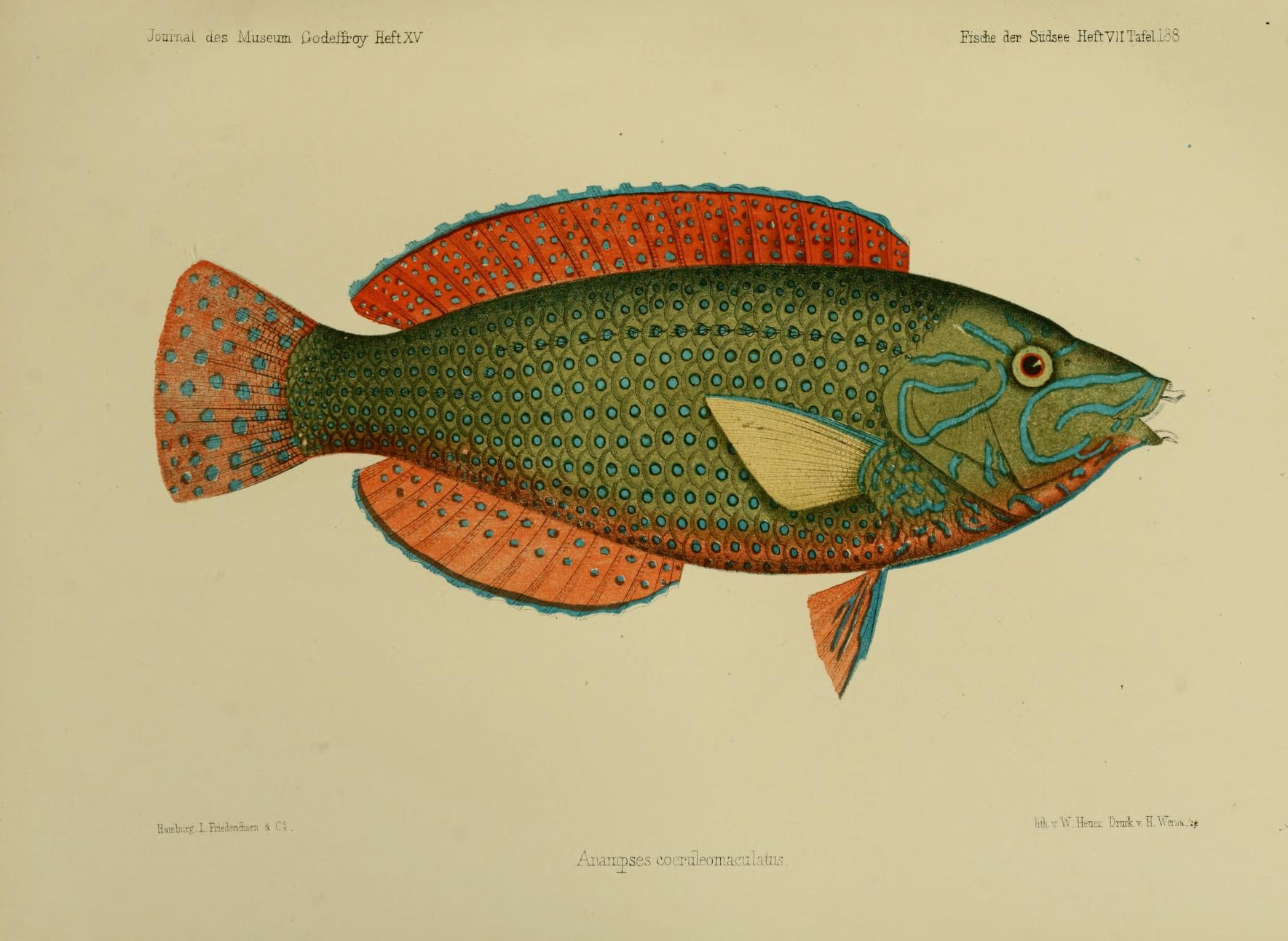
Journal des Museum Godeffroy, vol. 4, issue XV Fische der Südsee Heft VII Tafel 138

=== Main work ===
Heuer's main work, Hamburg und seine Umgebungen, was published by Carl Gassmann. Heuer opened it in 1853 with the first twelve Steindrucken. In the course of the following years, this work grew into a constantly updated general view of Hamburg. With further large-format lithographs of the Hanseatic city and its surroundings, Heuer advanced to become one of the most respected lithographers in northern Germany. In the last years of his life he created 84 autographs before he died in Hamburg on 15 April 1890 at the age of 76.

Selection

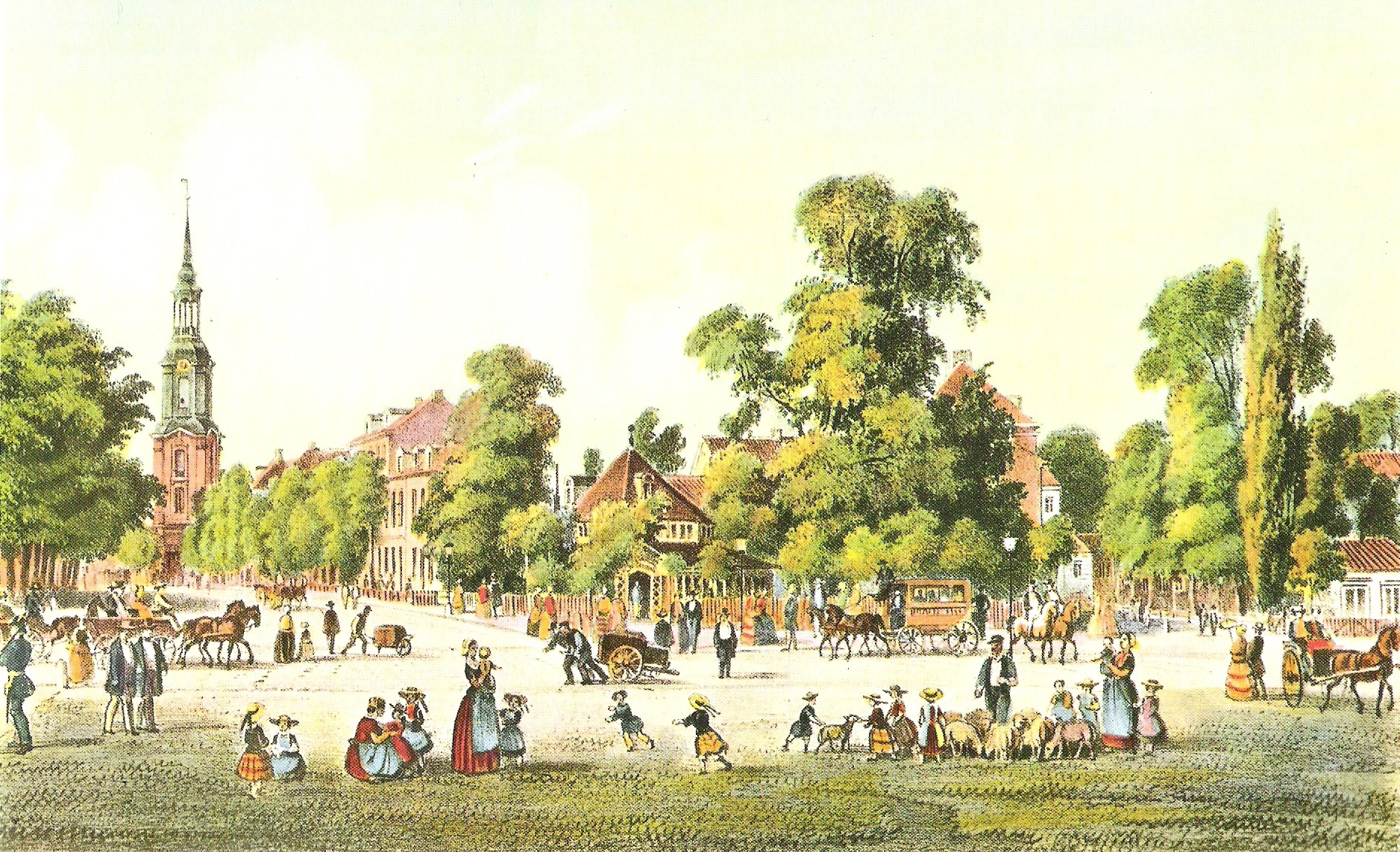
1855 – St. Georg

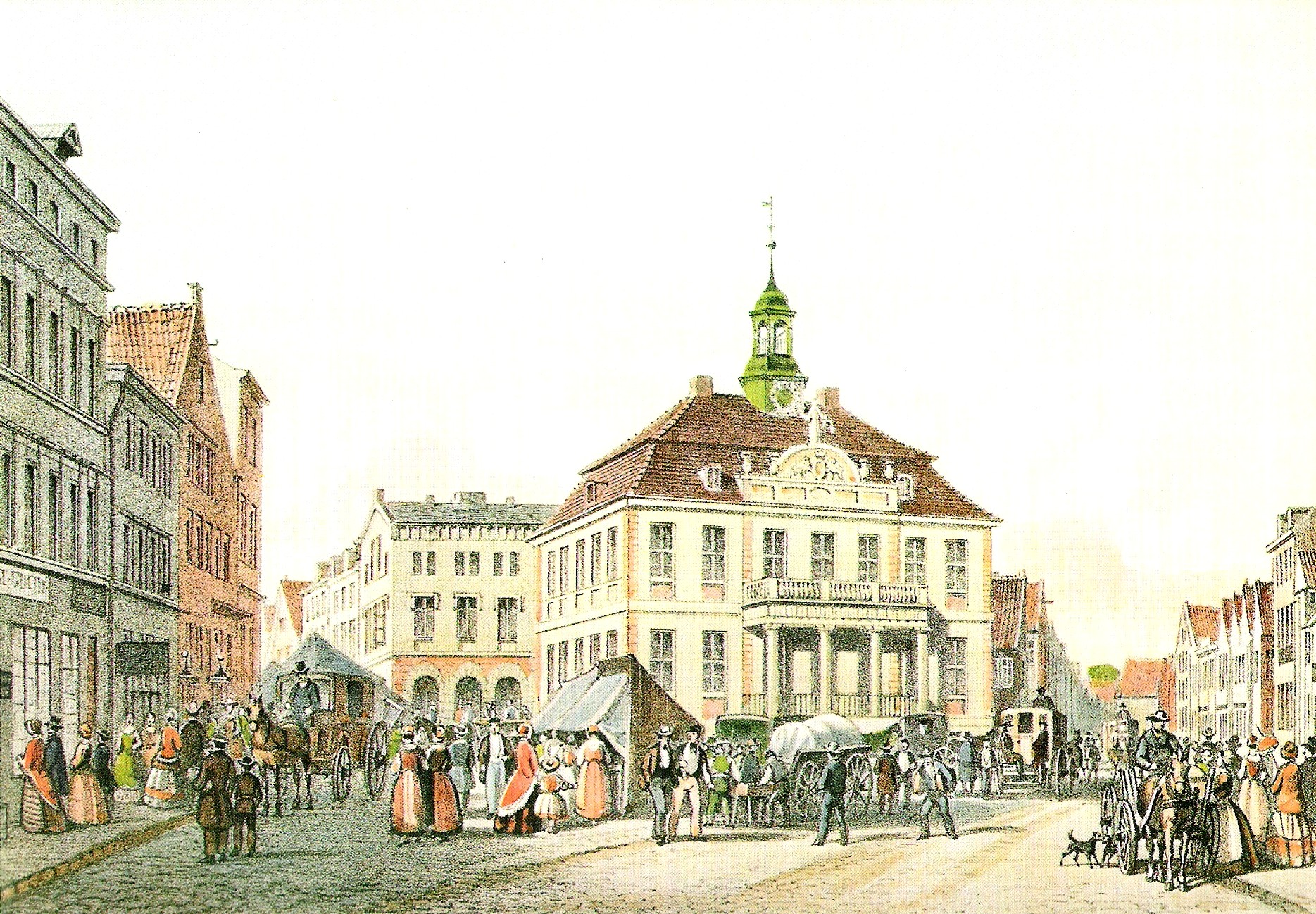
1856 – Altona

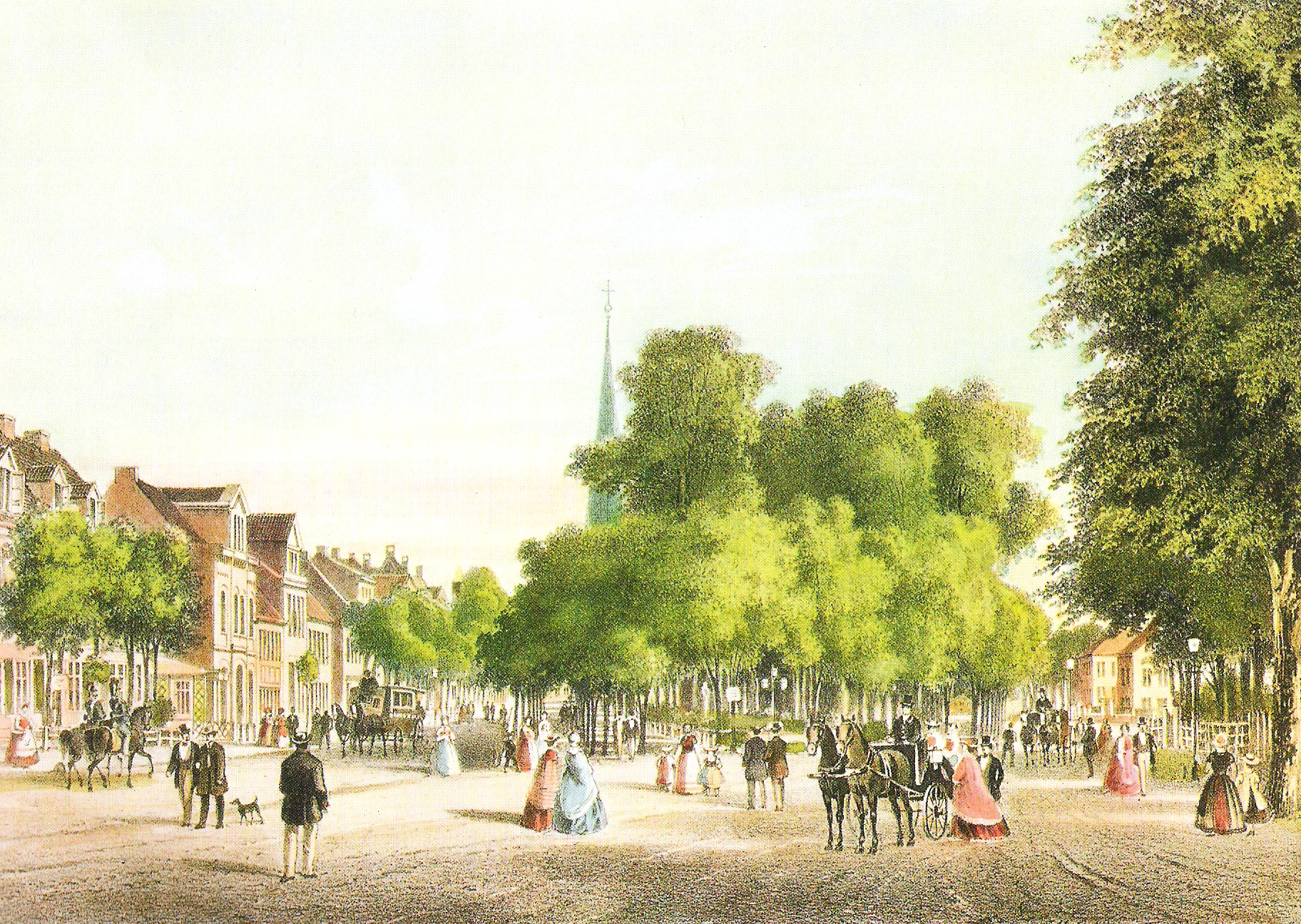
1861 – Wandsbek
