= Lester Lave =

American environmental economist

Lester Barnard Lave
- Born: August 5, 1939; Philadelphia
- Died: May 9, 2011 (aged 71)
- Education: Reed College; Harvard University
- Known for: Environmental economics
- Scientific career
- Workplaces: Carnegie Mellon University
- Thesis: Measurement of Technological Change in American Agriculture, 1850 – 1960
- Doctoral students: Saras Sarasvathy

Lester Barnard Lave (August 5, 1939 – May 9, 2011) was an American economist who helped pioneer the field of environmental economics, notably the idea that environmental problems have quantifiable economic costs. In August 1970, over two decades before the Harvard Six Cities study definitively settled the issue, Lave and his graduate student Eugene P. Seskin published research suggesting that air pollution in American cities was causing higher death rates and attempted to calculate its economic cost.

Lave went on to publish books and papers on many other environmental issues, including toxic chemicals, soil carbon, and electric cars, and studied methodological tools such as cost-benefit and risk analysis. At the time of his death, he was Harry B. and James H. Higgins Professor of Economics at the Tepper School of Business, professor of engineering and public policy, director of the Green Design Institute, and co-director of the Electricity Industry Center at Carnegie Mellon University.

== Life and career ==
=== Early career ===
Lave was born in Philadelphia in 1939, and graduated Phi Beta Kappa in economics from Reed College in Portland, Oregon, in 1960, where he studied with economists Carl Stevens, Arthur Leigh, and George Hay. While studying for a Ph.D. in economics at Harvard University, which he earned in 1963, he decided to dedicate his career to working on significant problems that would make a real difference to people's lives. As he later summarized his research "mission": "I have the job of focusing my work on highly controversial issues and generally have the fun of showing that the conventional wisdom is wrong". He became a professor of economics at Carnegie Mellon University in 1963. That year, he also published his first research study, which considered the value of improved weather information to the Californian raisin industry.

=== Air pollution and health ===
In 1970, Lave and his student Eugene Seskin gained international prominence with the publication of an article in Science linking urban air pollution to higher mortality. They argued for "a strong association between all respiratory diseases and air pollution" and estimated "the amount saved [from reduced respiratory diseases] by a 50 percent reduction in air pollution in major urban areas would be $1222 million", with an additional saving of $468 million from reduced cardiovascular morbidity and mortality, which they noted "are surely underestimates".

The paper "landed [Lave] on Richard Nixon's enemies list", and was "so trailblazing that he almost lost his job as a Carnegie Mellon University economist... [but] then-university president Richard Cyert refused to bow to the pressure and fire him". Lave's research helped to shape the development of the Clean Air Act and the way the Environmental Protection Agency supervised it, but, according to epidemiologist Devra Davis, was gradually neglected because Lave was "too far ahead of his time. The world was not ready to accept the implications of his work, and the pressures to keep things going as they were proved far more powerful".

Lave and Seskin developed their ideas at much greater length in a textbook, Air Pollution and Human Health, published in 1977, which argued air pollution was causing serious public health problems that could be addressed only with drastic changes in public policy.

Lave continued to monitor progress in tackling air pollution, though was sceptical that regulations like the Clean Air Act were as effective as environmentalists claimed. In a 1981 paper published by the Brookings Institution, Lave and Gilbert S. Omenn argued that much of the apparent progress in cleaning the air could be attributed to mediocre economic performance and the gradual switch from coal to relatively cleaner fuels like oil and natural gas.

A major methodological problem with Lave and Seskin's research was its reliance on cross-sectional data (based on statistical observations of a large number of essentially anonymous people at single points in time). As air pollution researchers C. Arden Pope and Douglas Dockery later pointed out, such: "population-based cross-sectional mortality rate studies were largely discounted by 1997 because of concern that they could not control for individual risk factors, such as cigarette smoking, which could potentially confound the air pollution effects". That problem was resolved when researchers switched to using cohort studies instead, which study known populations of people over long periods of time, so "can control for individual differences in age, sex, smoking history, and other risk factors".

The association between urban air pollution and mortality was effectively settled with the publication of the Harvard Six Cities cohort study in 1993, which cited Lave and Seskin's paper in its very first sentence, and its numerous follow-ups. One of its authors, C. Arden Pope, has noted the importance of Lave's earlier work and how it was largely overlooked for over two decades: "We should have just listened to him". According to Devra Davis: "What [Lave and Seskin] achieved was barely short of a revolution in public health research. It took about two decades for the public health profession to catch up".

=== Costs and risks of decisions ===
Lave turned to other research interests, including transport issues (such as automobile safety and traffic congestion), health care costs and efficiency, deregulation of energy markets, and the health effects of electric power generation.

Although Lave was "among the most accomplished practitioners" of cost-benefit analysis, he gradually came to question its value in making socially and politically contentious decisions, notably in a scathing 1996 paper, in which he wrote: "The foundation of benefit-cost analysis is flawed: the tool cannot provide what some economists claim... With the exception of economists who are utilitarians or unwitting utilitarians, there is general agreement that the option identified as having the largest net benefit does not have a strong claim to being the best social choice".

Lave also published numerous books and papers on risk management and was one of the first researchers to explore the concept of "risk risk", also known as risk tradeoff analysis (how reducing some risks can increase others). Lave summarized this idea with a caution: "Never do absolute risk analysis; do relative risk analysis... Always consider the risk of having versus the risk of not having (i.e., relative risk)". Lave explored risk tradeoffs practically as well as theoretically. In 1995, in a study co-authored with colleagues from Carnegie Mellon, published in Science, he provoked controversy by arguing that, although electric cars could reduce the risk from air pollution, they might increase other environmental risks if their electricity was generated in environmentally harmful ways or they increased people's exposure to lead, which was then widely used in lead-acid rechargeable batteries. According to New Scientist, reaction to the study was "hostile" with critics arguing the authors had "missed the point completely" and accusing them of "misleading scare tactics". Either way, Lave and his colleagues had anticipated modern debates about the environmental impact of electric cars by many years.

=== Other activities ===
Lave briefly taught at Harvard University, Northwestern University, and the University of Pittsburgh, and spent four-years working as a senior fellow in the economic studies program at Brookings Institution in the 1980s. However, he spent most of his five-decade career at Carnegie Mellon University, where he was chair of the department of economics (1971–1978), presented "one of the first university courses on the economics of the environment", co-founded the Green Design Institute in 1992, and co-founded the Electricity Industry Center, an interdisciplinary group studying power-generation issues, in 2001.

Lave published 28 books and around 400 other publications and supervised around 40 doctoral students.

He served on the committees of the National Academy of Sciences and the American Association for the Advancement of Science.

== Awards ==
Lave's work on air pollution and public health was recognized by his election to the Institute of Medicine of the National Academies in 1982. In 1987, CMU awarded him the George Leland Bach Teaching Award. The Society for Risk Analysis awarded Lave its Distinguished Achievement Award in 1998.

== Selected publications ==
=== Books ===
- Lave, Lester; Seskin, Eugene (1977). Air Pollution and Human Health. Johns Hopkins University Press. ISBN 978-1-135-99666-6.
- Lave, Lester; Upton, Arthur (1987). Toxic Chemicals, Health, and the Environment. Johns Hopkins University Press. ISBN 978-0-8018-3474-5.
- Lave, Lester, ed. (1987). Risk Assessment and Management. Springer Science & Business Media. ISBN 978-1-4757-6443-7. OCLC 1058892111.
- Hendrickson, Chris; Lave, Lester; Matthews, H. Scott (2010). Environmental Life Cycle Assessment of Goods and Services: An Input-Output Approach. Routledge. ISBN 978-1-136-52549-0.

=== Papers ===
- Lave, Lester B.; Seskin, Eugene P. (21 August 1970). "Air Pollution and Human Health". Science. 169 (3947): 723–733. Bibcode:1970Sci...169..723L. doi:10.1126/science.169.3947.723. eISSN 1095-9203. ISSN 0036-8075. PMID 5432570.
- Arrow, Kenneth J.; Cropper, Maureen L.; Eads, George C.; Hahn, Robert W.; Lave, Lester B.; et al. (12 April 1996). "Is There a Role for Benefit-Cost Analysis in Environmental, Health, and Safety Regulation?". Science. 272 (5259): 221–222. Bibcode:1996Sci...272..221A. doi:10.1126/science.272.5259.221. eISSN 1095-9203. ISSN 0036-8075. PMID 8602504.
- Sarasvathy, D.K.; Simon, Herbert A.; Lave, Lester (January 1998). "Perceiving and managing business risks: differences between entrepreneurs and bankers". Journal of Economic Behavior & Organization. 33 (2): 207–225. doi:10.1016/S0167-2681(97)00092-9. ISSN 0167-2681.
- Lal, Rattan; Griffin, Michael; Apt, Jay; Lave, Lester; Morgan, M. Granger (16 April 2004). "Managing Soil Carbon". Science. 304 (5669): 393. doi:10.1126/science.1093079. eISSN 1095-9203. ISSN 0036-8075. PMID 15087532. S2CID 129925989.

== See also ==
- Particulates
