= Susan Hankinson =

American researcher and academic

- Education: Harvard School of Public Health; University of Maine; University of Minnesota
- Scientific career
- Workplaces: University of Massachusetts Amherst; Harvard University
- Thesis: Environmental determinants of cataract (1992)
- Doctoral students: A. Heather Eliassen

Susan Hankinson is an American cancer researcher who is the Distinguished Professor of Epidemiology at the University of Massachusetts Amherst. Her research considers cancer epidemiology and the etiology of breast cancer. Her work has demonstrated the relationship between hormones and breast cancer risk. In 2023, she was awarded the American Association for Cancer Research Award for Research Excellence in Cancer Epidemiology and Prevention.

== Early life and education ==
Hankinson studied nursing at the University of Maine. After earning her bachelor's degree, she moved to the University of Minnesota, where she earned a master's degree in environmental health. In Minnesota, she earned a Masters of Public Health, before moving to Harvard University to complete a Doctor of Science. Her doctoral research looked at the environmental determinants of cataracts.

== Research and career ==
Hankinson is an expert in cancer epidemiology and the use of biomarkers in epidemiological studies. She looks to develop more sophisticated prediction models for breast cancer diagnoses that helps women better understand their risk. She created a breast cancer biomarker discovery program that demonstrated the association between hormones, lifestyle factors, and cancer risk. Her research demonstrated that women who used hormone replacement therapy were more likely to suffer from breast cancer than women who did not, and that the risk was highest amongst women who used a progestin–oestrogen combination therapy. The increased risk associated with hormone replacement therapy depended on body mass index; women with a body mass index below 25 were most at risk.

From 2006 to 2010, Hankinson was Principal Investigator of the Nurses' Health Study, where, in a trial of over 200,000 people, she investigated how lifestyle (dietary intake, obesity) and hormones impact cancer risk. Her research showed that people who work night shifts experience a greater cancer risk. She joined the University of Massachusetts Amherst in 2011.

Hankinson has also studied the relationship between chronic stress and heart disease. To do this, she studied metabolites in blood samples using mass spectrometry.

Hankinson received the 2020 American Association for Cancer Research Distinguished Lectureship in Breast Cancer Research award, and was named by research.com as the 28th most highly cited women scientist in the world by research in 2022. In 2023, she was awarded the American Association for Cancer Research award for Excellence in Cancer Epidemiology and Prevention.

== Selected publications ==
- J E Manson; W C Willett; Meir J. Stampfer; Graham A. Colditz; David J. Hunter; Susan E. Hankinson; Charles H. Hennekens; Frank E. Speizer (14 September 1995). "Body Weight and Mortality among Women". The New England Journal of Medicine. 333 (11): 677–685. doi:10.1056/nejm199509143331101. ISSN 0028-4793. PMID 7637744. Wikidata Q22250911.
- Douglas F Easton; Karen A Pooley; Alison M Dunning; et al. (28 June 2007). "Genome-wide association study identifies novel breast cancer susceptibility loci". Nature. 447 (7148): 1087–93. Bibcode:2007Natur.447.1087E. doi:10.1038/nature05887. ISSN 1476-4687. PMC 2714974. PMID 17529967. Wikidata Q24645441.
- Graham A. Colditz, M.B., B.S.; Susan E. Hankinson, Sc.D.; David J. Hunter, M.B., B.S.; et al. (1 June 1995). "The use of estrogens and progestins and the risk of breast cancer in postmenopausal women". The New England Journal of Medicine. 332 (24): 1589–1593. doi:10.1056/nejm199506153322401. ISSN 0028-4793. PMID 7753136. Wikidata Q57752001.
