= Judith R. Lave =

Professor Emerita of Health Policy and Management

- Alma mater: Queen's University (B.A. 1961); Harvard University (M.A., Ph.D.)
- Occupations: Health economist, professor
- Employer: University of Pittsburgh (Professor Emerita)
- Known for: Health care financing; graduate medical education costs; Medicare policy; economics of mental health
- Spouse: Lester B. Lave (m. 1965; died 2011)
- Children: 2
- Awards: Member, National Academy of Medicine (1990); Member, National Academy of Social Insurance; Distinguished Fellow, AcademyHealth; Honorary Doctor of Laws, Queen's University (1994)

Judith R. Lave is a health economist and Professor Emerita of Health Policy and Management at the University of Pittsburgh Graduate School of Public Health. She was elected to the National Academy of Medicine (then the Institute of Medicine) in 1990, Lave was a member of the National Academy of Social Insurance, a Distinguished Fellow of AcademyHealth, and served as Director of the Office of Research at the Health Care Financing Administration (now the Centers for Medicare and Medicaid Services).

== Education ==
Lave attended Queen's University in Kingston, Ontario, where she earned a B.A. in 1961. She then went to Harvard University for graduate study, completing an M.A. and a Ph.D. in economics.

== Career ==
Lave began her academic career as a faculty member at Carnegie Mellon University. Later, she served as director of the Division of Economic and Quantitative Analysis in the Office of the Deputy Assistant Secretary for Planning and Evaluation at the Department of Health and Human Services, and as Director of the Office of Research at the Health Care Financing Administration (HCFA).

Lave joined the University of Pittsburgh in 1982 as Professor of Health Economics in the Graduate School of Public Health, with secondary appointments in economics, business administration, and psychiatry. At Pittsburgh she served as Chair of the Department of Health Policy and Management (2002–2010), Director of the Health Administration Program, Director of the Pennsylvania Medicaid Policy Center, and Co-Director of the Center for Research on Health Care. She became Professor Emerita in 2016.

Lave served as a commissioner on the Prospective Payment Assessment Commission (ProPAC) and on its successor, the Medicare Payment Advisory Commission (MedPAC). She was President of the Association for Health Services Research (the precursor of AcademyHealth).

== Research ==
Her early work on hospital cost functions, conducted with Lester Lave, was published in the American Economic Review in 1970. With Richard Frank and others in 1986, she studied how Medicare's PPS affected psychiatric patients treated in general hospital "scatter beds", and proposed alternative payment approaches for inpatient psychiatric care. In a 1998 cost-effectiveness study of treatments for major depression in primary care, Lave and colleagues introduced "depression-free days" as an outcome measure, an alternative to the binary classification of patients as "depressed" or "not depressed" that has since been widely adopted in mental health cost-effectiveness research.

Her study of the impact of a children's health insurance program on newly enrolled children in 1998, which a University of Pittsburgh department newsletter described as important in the development of the Children's Health Insurance Program, as well as studies of the effect of Medicare Part D on drug and medical spending among elderly beneficiaries and of employees' choice of high-deductible health plans across multiple employers. The 1998 JAMA paper won the annual health care research award of the National Institute for Health Care Management.

== Honors and awards ==
- 1990: Elected Member, Institute of Medicine (now National Academy of Medicine)
- 1994: Honorary Doctor of Laws, Queen's University
- 1999: First author of JAMA paper awarded the National Institute for Health Care Management's annual research award
- 2011: Distinguished Mentor Award, Institute for Clinical Research Education, University of Pittsburgh
- Member, National Academy of Social Insurance
- Distinguished Fellow, AcademyHealth

== Selected publications ==
Lave has more than 170 scientific publications. Representative works include:

- Lave, J.R., & Lave, L.B. (1970). "Hospital Cost Functions: Estimating Cost Functions for Multi-Product Firms." American Economic Review, 60(3), 379–395.
- Lave, J.R., & Frank, R.G. (1990). "Medicare Financing for Mental Health Care." Health Affairs, 9(1), 19–30.
- Lave, J.R., Frank, R.G., Schulberg, H.C., & Kamlet, M.S. (1998). "Cost-Effectiveness of Treatments for Major Depression in Primary Care Practice." Archives of General Psychiatry, 55(7), 645–651.
- Lave, J.R., et al. (1998). "The Impact of a Children's Health Insurance Program on Newly Enrolled Children." JAMA, 279(22), 1820–1825.
- Zhang, Y., Donohue, J.M., Lave, J.R., et al. (2009). "The Effect of Medicare Part D on Drug and Medical Spending." New England Journal of Medicine, 361(1), 52–61.
- Lave, J.R., et al. (2011). "Employee Choice of a High Deductible Health Plan Across Multiple Employers." Health Services Research, 46(1 Pt 1), 138–153.
- Lave, J.R. (2003). "Developing a Medicare Prospective Payment System for Inpatient Psychiatric Care." Health Affairs, 22(5), 97–109.

== Personal life ==
Lave married Lester B. Lave in 1965. Lester Lave was a leading environmental economist at Carnegie Mellon University; he died on May 9, 2011, after a brief struggle with cancer.
