= Phyllis Stern =

American nursing theorist (1925–2014)

- Born: September 2, 1925; San Carlos, California
- Died: May 4, 2014 (aged 88)
- Education: San Francisco State University; University of California, San Francisco
- Awards: Living Legend of the American Academy of Nursing (2008)
- Scientific career
- Fields: Nursing theory, nursing education
- Workplaces: Dalhousie University; Indiana University

Phyllis Noerager Stern (September 2, 1925 – May 4, 2014) was an American registered nurse, college professor and nursing theorist. Stern was known for her contributions to international women's health and for developing Glaserian grounded theory approaches used in nursing research. She held faculty appointments at several schools, including Dalhousie University and Indiana University. She was designated a Living Legend of the American Academy of Nursing in 2008.

== Biography ==
=== Early life ===
Stern was born in San Carlos, California in 1925. She attended the Mount Zion Hospital School of Nursing under the Cadet Nurse Corps program during World War II and earned a nursing diploma. She worked on nursing units until she was almost 40 years old and returned to the College of San Mateo for an associate degree.

Continuing with her studies, Stern earned a bachelor's degree from San Francisco State University. She completed a master's degree from the University of California, San Francisco (UCSF) and landed a faculty position at California State University, Hayward. She returned to UCSF for a Doctor of Nursing Science so that she could secure a tenure-track position. Stern credited Shirley Chater, a nursing professor and member of her doctoral committee, with helping her to develop as a researcher.

=== Later contributions ===
Stern taught at Dalhousie University and Indiana University. She became known for her qualitative research expertise, having trained in grounded theory techniques under Barney Glaser. In discussing qualitative research techniques, Stern said that researchers often ask misguided questions of their subjects, but she said that the subjects always return to the topic that they really want to discuss.

She was a co-founder of the International Council on Women’s Health Issues and she served as editor-in-chief of the organization's journal, Health Care for Women International, from 1983 to 2001. As part of an 80th birthday tribute, Sandra P. Thomas of the University of Tennessee conducted an analysis of the themes apparent in Stern's editorials from Health Care for Women International. Thomas described Stern as much different than the typical journal editor, asserting that she could be "irreverent, droll, and even a bit risque at times." Her writings often involved cultural issues and sometimes described the frustrations in academic work.

=== Honors and awards ===
In 2008, Stern was named a Living Legend of the American Academy of Nursing. The University of Pennsylvania named a distinguished lectureship in honor of her. Stern received an honorary doctorate from Dalhousie.

== See also ==
- List of Living Legends of the American Academy of Nursing
