= A. Heather Eliassen =

American public health researcher and academic

- Education: Harvard T.H. Chan School of Public Health; Dartmouth College
- Scientific career
- Workplaces: Harvard T.H. Chan School of Public Health; Harvard Medical School; Brigham and Women's Hospital
- Thesis: Lifestyle factors and risk of breast cancer (2004)
- Doctoral advisor: Susan Hankinson

A. Heather Eliassen is an American public health researcher who is a professor of epidemiology at the Harvard T.H. Chan School of Public Health. Her research considers the epidemiology of breast cancer and the identification of modifiable risk factors to reduce breast cancer risk.

== Early life and education ==
Eliassen studied history at Dartmouth College. She moved to the Harvard T.H. Chan School of Public Health for graduate studies, where she majored in epidemiology. Her doctoral research considered lifestyle factors for breast cancer, which she investigated alongside Susan Hankinson.

== Research and career ==
Eliassen studies lifestyle factors and breast cancer risk. She made use of the Nurses' Health Study to better understand how women adapt their lifestyles to reduce their risk of breast cancer. She showed that adolescent consumption of red meat was associated with premenopausal breast cancer, whilst intake of poultry resulted in a lower risk. Additionally, she showed that high fiber cruciferous and orange vegetables reduce the risk of breast cancer.

Eliassen's research has shown that weight loss and increased exercise can reduce breast cancer risk after menopause. She also showed that increased levels of carotenoids in blood reduced breast cancer risk, with low risk of lethal breast cancer in people with high levels of carotenoids. Eliassen showed that high levels of circulating trans fatty acids was positively correlated with breast cancer risk, which was particularly high for overweight women.

In 2007, Eliassen was made Director of the Brigham and Women's Hospital Biorepository and in 2009 Associated Director of the Nurses' Health Study.

== Selected publications ==
- Long H Nguyen; David A Drew; Mark S Graham; Amit D Joshi; et al. (July 30, 2020). "Risk of COVID-19 among front-line health-care workers and the general community: a prospective cohort study". Lancet Public Health. doi:10.1016/s2468-2667(20)30164-x. ISSN 2468-2667. PMID 32745512. Wikidata Q98194003.
- Kyriaki Michailidou; Sara Lindström; Joe Dennis; Jonathan Beesley; et al. (October 23, 2017). "Association analysis identifies 65 new breast cancer risk loci". Nature. 551 (7678): 92–94. Bibcode:2017Natur.551...92M. doi:10.1038/nature24284. ISSN 1476-4687. PMC 5798588. PMID 29059683. Wikidata Q45979098.
- A Heather Eliassen; Graham Colditz; Bernard Rosner; Walter C Willett; et al. (July 1, 2006). "Adult weight change and risk of postmenopausal breast cancer". JAMA. 296 (2): 193–201. doi:10.1001/jama.296.2.193. ISSN 0098-7484. PMID 16835425. Wikidata Q47330282.
