= Dan Krewski =

Canadian physician

Daniel Krewski is an Academic who is Professor of Medicine and Professor of Epidemiology and Community Medicine at the University of Ottawa, where his focus is health risk assessment in the Institute of Population Health.
