= Nicola Gavey =

New Zealand psychology academic

- Born: 1960 (age 65–66)
- Education: University of Auckland
- Scientific career
- Fields: Gender and sexual politics
- Workplaces: University of Auckland
- Thesis: Rape and sexual coercion within heterosexual relationships: an intersection of psychological, feminist, and postmodern inquiries

Nicola Gavey (born 1960) is a New Zealand psychology academic. She is currently a full professor at the University of Auckland.

== Academic career ==
After a 1985 MA titled 'Depressive self-schemata and gender-schemata in women' and a 1990 PhD titled 'Rape and sexual coercion within heterosexual relationships : an intersection of psychological, feminist, and postmodern inquiries' at the University of Auckland, she joined the staff, rising to full professor.

Much of Gavey's research focuses on the gender politics, sexuality, rape and coercion, and often features in the press.

== Selected works ==
- Gavey, Nicola. (1989) "Feminist poststructuralism and discourse analysis: Contributions to feminist psychology." Psychology of Women Quarterly 13 (4): 459–475.
- Gavey, Nicola. (1991) "Sexual victimization prevalence among New Zealand university students." Journal of Consulting and Clinical Psychology 59 (3): 464.
- Gavey, Nicola. (1992) "Technologies and effects of heterosexual coercion." Feminism & Psychology 2 (3): 325–351.
- McPhillips, Kathryn, Virginia Braun, and Nicola Gavey. (2001) "Defining (hetero) sex: how imperative is the “coital imperative”?." In Women's Studies International Forum, 24 (2): 229–240.
- Braun, Virginia, Nicola Gavey, and Kathryn McPhillips. (2003) "The fair deal'? Unpacking accounts of reciprocity in heterosex." Sexualities 6 (2): 237–261.
- Gavey, Nicola. (2013) Just sex?: The cultural scaffolding of rape. Routledge.
