= Growing Up Today Study =

Ongoing collaborative research project

The Growing Up Today Study (GUTS) is an ongoing collaborative research project between researchers at the Harvard T.H. Chan School of Public Health and Brigham and Women's Hospital in Boston, Massachusetts. Established in 1996 in the United States, the study collects data annually from over 26,000 participants in order to evaluate the factors that influence weight change and health throughout the life cycle. The participants are children (females and males) of the women who enrolled as participants in the second cohort of the Nurses' Health Study. Established in 1976, the Nurses' Health Study has collected data from 238,000 nurse participants, making it one of the largest and longest running investigations of factors that influence women’s health and risk for disease. Combined, the Growing Up Today Study and the Nurses’ Health Study can be considered a cross-generational super-study, leading to new insights and landmark findings in the field of public health research.

== Early Beginnings to Present ==
In 1996, at the start of the study, 16,882 children between the ages of 9 and 14 years old were enrolled in GUTS I. Eight years later, in 2004, the study expanded and a second cohort of 10,920 children between the ages of 10 and 17 were enrolled in GUTS II. Initially, the two separate cohorts were surveyed separately and biannually. Starting in 2013, the two cohorts joined as one (GUTS I & GUTS II), and are now surveyed annually. The participants are now all young adults, many of whom are starting families of their own — which could eventually lead to the possibility of a third generation of study participants and data collection.

Today, the Growing Up Today Study team includes doctors, researchers, and statisticians throughout the United States, and GUTS data is used by researchers across the globe. Major research topics include:

- Diet & Nutrition
- Physical Activity
- Substance Use
- Eating Disorders
- Gender
- Sexual Orientation
- Genetics
- Environmental factors
- Women’s Health
- Disease Risk
- Economic/Work Status

Nearly 100 research articles about health outcomes throughout a lifetime – from pregnancy and fertility to heart disease, hypertension, and diabetes—have been published as a result of their work and the continuous contributions of GUTS participants.

== Selected findings ==
- Girls who see thinness as important to their peers or who try to look like the women they see in TV, movies, and magazines are significantly more likely to exhibit bulimic tendencies (using laxatives or vomiting to control their weight).
- Children who report spending more time with TV, videos, and videogames gain more weight than children who engage less time in these activities.
- Children who eat dinner with their families tend to have healthier diets which include more fruits and vegetables and less fried food and soda.
- Children who perceive that their mother is frequently trying to lose weight are more likely to become highly concerned with their own weight or to be constantly dieting.
- Breastfeeding as an infant may lower the risk of being overweight during older childhood and adolescence.
- Girls were more likely to report using sunscreen than boys; they were also more likely to use tanning beds, and tanning bed use among girls in the cohort increased fivefold between the ages of 14 and 17.
- Increasing physical activity during the winter is strongly associated with losing weight (decline in BMI) among overweight girls.
- Dieting to control weight is ineffective for many adolescents and may actually promote weight gain.
- Being born to a mother with gestational diabetes increases a child’s risk for adolescent obesity.
- Drinking soda and other sugar-added beverages contributes to weight gain among adolescents.
- Offspring of women who experience severe childhood abuse have greater likelihood of developing their own depressive symptoms well into adulthood.
- A woman's consumption of peanuts/tree nuts during pregnancy is associated with increased tolerance and lowered risk of allergies to peanuts and tree nuts in their offspring.
