= Health Care for Women International =

- Discipline: Women's studies
- Language: English
- Edited by: Eleanor Krassen Covan

Publication details
- Former name(s): Issues in Health Care of Women
- History: 1978–present
- Publisher: Taylor & Francis (United States)
- Frequency: Monthly
- Impact factor: 0.950 (2015)

Standard abbreviations
- ISO 4: Health Care Women Int.

Indexing
- CODEN: HCWIDQ
- ISSN: 0739-9332 (print); 1096-4665 (web)
- LCCN: 96648170
- OCLC no.: 806353656

Links
- Journal homepage; Online access; Online archive; Online access at IngentaConnect

Health Care for Women International is a monthly peer-reviewed healthcare journal covering health care and related topics that concern women around the globe.

It is the official journal for Women's Health Issues and it is published by Taylor & Francis. Its editor-in-chief is Eleanor Krassen Covan (University of North Carolina at Wilmington).

== History ==
The journal was originally titled Issues in Health Care of Women (1978–1983).

The editor-in-chief from 1983 to 2001 was Phyllis Stern (University of Pennsylvania School of Nursing).

== Abstracting and indexing ==
- Ageline
- Cumulative Index to Nursing & Allied Health Literature
- CSA Social Services Abstracts
- CSA Sociological Abstracts
- Current Contents/Social and Behavioural Sciences
- EMCARE
- European Reference Index for the Humanities
- H.W. Wilson General Science Abstracts (GenSciAbs)
- H.W. Wilson General Science Index
- H.W. Wilson Index to Legal Periodicals & Books (LegalPeridodical)
- Index Medicus/MEDLINE/PubMed
- PAIS International
- PsycINFO/Psychological Abstracts
- Scopus
- Social Sciences Citation Index
- Studies on Women and Gender Abstracts

According to the Journal Citation Reports, the journal has a 2015 impact factor of 0.950, ranking it 20th out of 40 journals in the category "Women's Studies" and 115th out of 153 journals in the category "Public, Environmental & Occupational Health".

== See also ==
- List of women's studies journals
