= Frank E. Speizer =

American physician

- Born: 8 June 1935 (age 91); San Francisco, United States
- Education: Stanford University
- Known for: Nurses' Health Study; Harvard Six Cities study
- Awards: Charles S. Mott Prize (2001)
- Scientific career
- Fields: Respiratory medicine; Epidemiology
- Workplaces: Boston City Hospital; Harvard University
- Website: Official website

Frank Erwin Speizer (born 8 June 1935) is an American physician and epidemiologist, currently Professor of Environmental Health and Environmental Science at Harvard T.H. Chan School of Public Health, and Edward H. Kass Distinguished Professor of Medicine at Brigham and Women's Hospital, Harvard Medical School. He is best known for his work on two major epidemiological cohort studies: the Nurses' Health Study, which explored women's illnesses and health risk factors, and the Harvard Six Cities study, which definitively linked air pollution to higher death rates in urban areas.

== Early life and career ==
Speizer was born in San Francisco and studied for a bachelor's degree (1957) and MD (1960) at Stanford University and Stanford Medical School, completing his medical training at Boston City Hospital and Stanford-Palo Alto Hospital. After discovering a keen interest in mathematics, he began working in epidemiology, specializing in air pollution, initially as a summer student at the California State Health Department. His interest developed further when he took a research fellowship in respiratory physiology at Harvard School of Public Health, working with James Whittenberger, who was chair of physiology, and Benjamin Ferris. Later, he spent two years at the MRC Statistical Research Unit in London, researching asthma in young people with Sir Richard Doll. It was here that he first conceived the idea of doing a cohort study of women's health, initially looking into the effects of oral contraceptives on a population of doctors' wives.

== Research interests ==
After Speizer returned to Harvard, he worked with Whittenberger and Ferris on what would eventually become the Six Cities study: a cohort study of people living in urban areas that demonstrated an association between fine-particulate air pollution and higher death rates.

In 1976, inspired by his work in England, Speizer decided to conduct a large study of women's illnesses, notably cancer and heart disease, using a cohort of 120,000 nurses whose health would be monitored over the following years and decades. This became the first Nurses' Health Study, which spawned "hundreds of scientific papers... covering scores of diseases".

In a 2011 interview with Douglas Dockery, Speizer listed his research interests as "the natural history of chronic respiratory disease and... the components that cause the disease to get worse" and "the natural history of what happens as people get older, and the interaction with lifestyle and behavioural factors".

Semantic Scholar lists around 600 peer-reviewed papers credited to Speizer and his collaborators.

== Awards ==
Speizer was elected a Member of the National Academy of Medicine in 2000. His awards include the John Goldsmith Award for Outstanding Contributions to Environmental Epidemiology (awarded by the International Society for Environmental Epidemiology), the William Silen Lifetime Achievement in Mentoring Award (awarded by Harvard University), the World Lung Health Award (awarded by the American Thoracic Society), the Charles S. Mott Prize for cancer research, and the Excellence in Women's Health Award (awarded by the Jacobs Institute of Women's Health).

== Selected publications ==
- Willett, Walter C.; Sampson, Laura; Stampfer, Meir J.; Rosner, Bernard; Bain, Christopher; Witschi, Jelia; Hennekens, Charles H.; Speizer, Frank E. (July 1985). "Reproducibility And Validity Of A Semiquantitative Food Frequency Questionnaire". American Journal of Epidemiology. 122 (1): 51–65. doi:10.1093/Oxfordjournals.Aje.A114086. eISSN 1476-6256. ISSN 0002-9262. PMID 4014201.
- Willett, W. C.; Green, A.; Stampfer, M. J.; Speizer, F. E.; Colditz, G. A.; Rosner, B.; Monson, R. R.; Stason, W.; Hennekens, C. H. (1987-11-19). "Relative and absolute excess risks of coronary heart disease among women who smoke cigarettes". The New England Journal of Medicine. 317 (21): 1303–1309. doi:10.1056/NEJM198711193172102. ISSN 0028-4793. PMID 3683458.
- Dockery, Douglas; Pope, C. Arden; Xu, Xiping; Spengler, John; Ware, James; Fay, Martha; Ferris, Benjamin; Speizer, Frank (December 9, 1993). "An Association between Air Pollution and Mortality in Six U.S. Cities". N Engl J Med. 329 (24): 1753–1759. doi:10.1056/NEJM199312093292401. PMID 8179653.
- Pope, C.; Thun, M.; Namboodiri, M.; Dockery, D.; Evans, J.; Speizer, F.; Heath, J. (March 1995). "Particulate Air Pollution as a Predictor of Mortality in a Prospective Study of U.S. Adults". Am J Respir Crit Care Med. 151 (3_pt_1): 669–674. doi:10.1164/ajrccm/151.3_Pt_1.669. PMID 7881654.
- Laden, F.; Schwartz, J.; Speizer, F.; Dockery, D. (March 15, 2006). "Reduction in fine particulate air pollution and mortality: Extended follow-up of the Harvard Six Cities study". Am J Respir Crit Care Med. 173 (6): 667–672. doi:10.1164/rccm.200503-443OC. PMC 2662950. PMID 16424447.
- Bao, Ying; Bertoia, Monica; Lenart, Elizabeth; Stampfer, Meir; Willett, Walter; Speizer, Frank; Chavarro, Jorge (September 2016). "Origin, Methods, and Evolution of the Three Nurses' Health Studies". American Journal of Public Health. 106 (9): 1573–1581. doi:10.2105/AJPH.2016.303338. PMC 4981810. PMID 27459450.

== See also ==
- Walter Willett
