= Houdini Needles =

Mountain in British Columbia, Canada

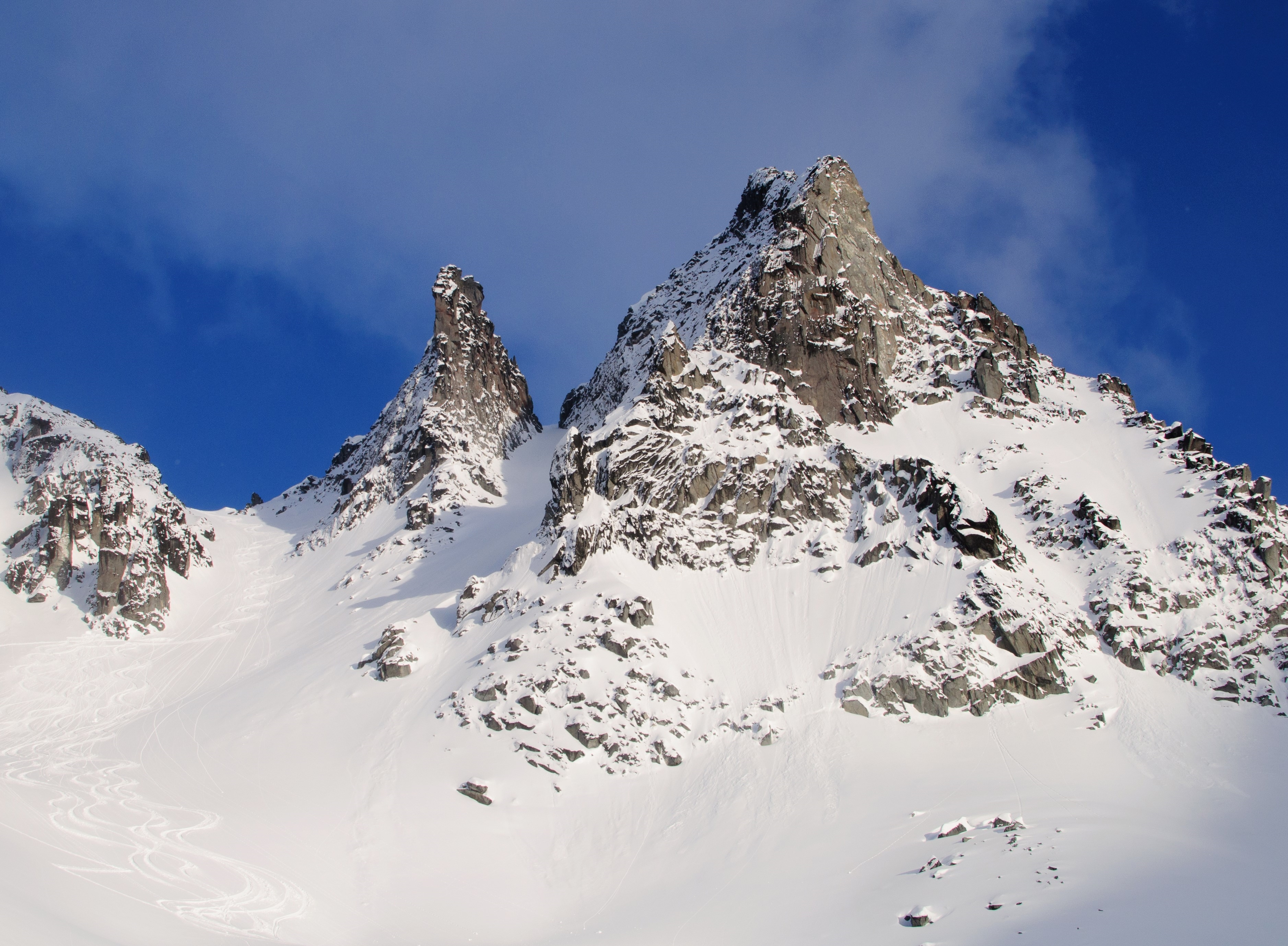
- South aspect

Highest point
- Elevation: 2,663 m (8,737 ft)
- Listing: Mountains of British Columbia
- Coordinates: 51°45′22″N 117°50′40″W

Naming
- Etymology: Houdini

Geography
- Location within British Columbia Location within Canada
- Interactive map of Houdini Needles
- Country: Canada
- Province: British Columbia
- District: Kootenay Land District
- Parent range: Adamant Range; Selkirk Mountains
- Topo map: NTS 82N13 Sullivan River

Climbing
- First ascent: 1948

Houdini Needles is a 2,663-metre (8,737-foot) mountain in British Columbia, Canada.

== Description ==
Houdini Needles is part of the Adamant Range which is a subrange of the Selkirk Mountains. It is located 79 km (49 mi) northwest of Golden and 30 km (19 mi) north of Glacier National Park. Houdini Needles is glaciated with the Gothics Glacier to the south of the peaks. Precipitation runoff and glacial meltwater from the mountain drains to Kinbasket Lake via Smith Creek. Topographic relief is significant as the summit rises 1,560 metres (5,418 ft) above Smith Creek in 3 km (1.9 mi).

== History ==
The mountain's toponym was officially adopted on March 4, 1965, by the Geographical Names Board of Canada. The mountain was named by William Lowell Putnam III who explained "When we first saw them from the Echo Glacier they looked so impressive and impossible that we decided only Houdini could get them...." Putnam, along with Andrew Kauffman, Benjamin Ferris and Henry Pinkham, were the members of the party who made the first ascent of the peaks in 1948.

== Climate ==
Based on the Köppen climate classification, Houdini Needles is located in a subarctic climate zone with cold, snowy winters, and mild summers. Winter temperatures can drop below −20 °C with wind chill factors below −30 °C. This climate supports the Gothics Glacier on the south side of the peaks.

== See also ==
- Geography of British Columbia
