= Krina Zondervan =

Dutch biomedical scientist

Krina Tynke Zondervan
- Education: University of Oxford; Leiden University; Erasmus University Rotterdam
- Scientific career
- Workplaces: University of Oxford; University of Pittsburgh; Queensland Institute of Technology
- Thesis: The epidemiology of chronic pelvic pain in women (1999)

Krina Tynke Zondervan is a Dutch biomedical scientist who is a Professor of Genomic Epidemiology at the University of Oxford. She serves on the board of the World Endometriosis Society.

== Early life and education ==
Zondervan was born in the Netherlands. She was a masters student in biomedical sciences at the Leiden University. She moved to the University of Oxford as an Erasmus Programme student in 1993, where she worked toward a doctorate in the epidemiology of chronic pelvic pain. She was awarded a Medical Research Council Research Fellowship to work on Genetic Epidemiology. She was part of the Wellcome Centre for Human Genetics in genetic epidemiology. During this fellowship she earned an additional master's degree in genetic epidemiology at the Erasmus University Rotterdam. She completed research projects at the Queensland Institute of Technology and University of Pittsburgh.

== Research and career ==
Zondervan was made a Wellcome Trust Research Development Fellow in 2007. She was made Director of the Endometriosis CaRe centre in Oxford in 2012. She was promoted to Professor of Genomic Epidemiology and Fellow of St Edmund Hall in 2015.

Zondervan's research considers the pathogenesis of women's health conditions through the use of genomic and environmental epidemiological research. She is particularly focussed on endometriosis, a chronic inflammatory condition that involves endometrial-like cells in the uterus. The condition impacts up to 10% of reproductive-age women and has very few effective treatments. She has studied the genetic factors that underpin risk to endometriosis, and uses this work to design new therapeutic treatments.

Zondervan founded the International Endometriosis Genome Consortium who oversee genome-wide association studies of endometriosis. The consortium, which research centres around the world who collect data on tens of thousands of women suffering from endometriosis. Together with Stacey Missmer at Michigan State University Zondervan led the development of phenotypic tools (the World Endometriosis Research Foundation Endometriosis Phenome and Biobanking Harmonisation Project, WERF EPHect), which looks to standardise the reporting and processing of endometriosis patient information.

Zondervan was elected a Fellow of the Academy of Medical Sciences in 2024.

== Selected publications ==
- Carl A Anderson; Fredrik H Pettersson; Geraldine M Clarke; Lon R Cardon; Andrew P Morris; Krina Zondervan (26 August 2010). "Data quality control in genetic case-control association studies". Nature Protocols. 5 (9): 1564–1573. doi:10.1038/nprot.2010.116. ISSN 1754-2189. PMC 3025522. PMID 21085122. Wikidata Q33749328.
- Kelechi E Nnoaham; Lone Hummelshoj; Premila Webster; et al. (30 June 2011). "Impact of endometriosis on quality of life and work productivity: a multicenter study across ten countries". Fertility and Sterility. 96 (2): 366-373.e8. doi:10.1016/j.fertnstert.2011.05.090. ISSN 0015-0282. PMC 3679489. PMID 21718982. Wikidata Q36920902.
- Iris M Heid; Anne U Jackson; Joshua C Randall; et al. (10 October 2010). "Meta-analysis identifies 13 new loci associated with waist-hip ratio and reveals sexual dimorphism in the genetic basis of fat distribution". Nature Genetics. 42 (11): 949–960. doi:10.1038/ng.685. ISSN 1061-4036. PMC 3000924. PMID 20935629. Wikidata Q34142739. (erratum)

Zondervan has written for The Conversation.

== Personal life ==
Zondervan is married with two daughters.
