= C. Arden Pope =

American economist

C. Arden Pope III
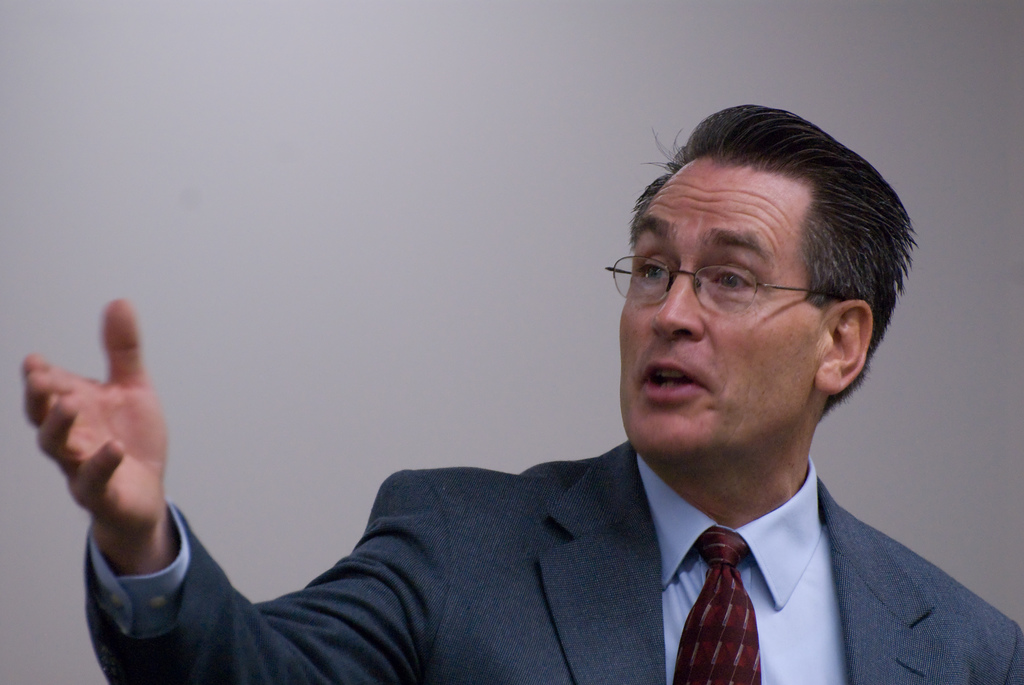
- Pope, speaking at Utah Valley University, September 18, 2008.
- Education: Iowa State University (PhD, MS); Brigham Young University (BS)
- Occupation: Professor
- Employer: Brigham Young University
- Known for: Studies on the health effects of air pollution
- Notable work: Respiratory hospital admissions associated with PM10 pollution in Utah, Salt Lake, and Cache Valleys (1991), An Association between Air Pollution and Mortality in Six U.S. Cities (1993), Particulate air pollution as a predictor of mortality in a prospective study of U.S. adults (1995).
- Title: Mary Lou Fulton Professor of Economics

C. Arden Pope III (born c. 1954) is an American professor of economics at Brigham Young University and one of the world's foremost experts in environmental science. He received his B.S. from Brigham Young University (BYU) in 1978 and his Ph.D. in economics and statistics from Iowa State University in 1981. Although his research includes many papers on topics in the fields in which he was trained—environmental economics, resource economics, and agricultural economics—he is better known for his cross-disciplinary work in environmental epidemiology and public health. He is world-renowned for his seminal work on the effects of particulate air pollution on mortality and health. His articles have helped establish the connection between air pollution and health problems, including cancer, cardiovascular, and pulmonary disease. These research findings have influenced environmental policy in the United States and Europe, contributing to the establishment of emission standards for particulate matter pollution.

== Air pollution research ==
Early in Pope's career he published a paper that made him an academic cornerstone of environmental science and policy called "Respiratory hospital admissions associated with PM10 pollution in Utah, Salt Lake, and Cache Valleys". In Utah Valley, the Geneva Steel Mill generated large quantities of particulate matter, a byproduct of fossil fuel consumption. The mill was shut down temporarily in 1986–87 as U.S. Steel sold the facility to new ownership. Pope compiled hospital admissions data for the time before, during, and after the temporary closing of the mill and was the first to convincingly show the immediate health harms associated with atmospheric particulate matter. Asthma, mortality, and respiratory admissions generally were twice as high while the plant was operating than the year in which it was closed. Utah made a particularly suitable natural experiment as the various valleys included in the study trap pollution in the winter months when temperature inversions stifle the escape of pollution. His abstract states:

This study assessed the association between respiratory hospital admissions and PM10 pollution in Utah, Salt Lake, and Cache valleys during April 1985 through March 1989. Utah and Salt Lake valleys had high levels of PM10 pollution that violated both the annual and 24-h standards issued by the Environmental Protection Agency (EPA). Much lower PM10 levels occurred in the Cache Valley. Utah Valley experienced the intermittent operation of its primary source of PM10 pollution: an integrated steel mill. Bronchitis and asthma admissions for preschool-age children were approximately twice as frequent in Utah Valley when the steel mill was operating versus when it was not. Similar differences were not observed in Salt Lake or Cache valleys. Even though Cache Valley had higher smoking rates and lower temperatures in winter than did Utah Valley, per capita bronchitis and asthma admissions for all ages were approximately twice as high in Utah Valley. During the period when the steel mill was closed, differences in per capita admissions between Utah and Cache valleys narrowed considerably. Regression analysis also demonstrated a statistical association between respiratory hospital admissions and PM10 pollution. The results suggest that PM10 pollution plays a role in the incidence and severity of respiratory disease.

— C. Arden Pope

Pope came under political pressure and his findings provoked controversy. Later scrutiny revealed his results were accurate.

=== Six Cities and American Cancer Society studies ===
Pope worked with Douglas Dockery of Harvard University on a 16-year scientific study of air pollution in six major cities in the United States, which published its findings in 1993. Known as the Harvard Six Cities study, it proved to be a milestone in establishing the human health effects associated with long-term exposure to fine particulate pollution, and remains one of the most highly citied studies of air pollution ever published. Like Pope's Utah Valley research, the Six Cities study proved intensely controversial. The study's conclusions were affirmed in 2000 after a three-year-long independent analysis carried out by the Health Effects Institute. They have also been supported by numerous follow-up studies.

Pope and Dockery also collaborated on a long-term study of the effects of air pollution on over half a million people from 151 urban areas, which published its first results in 1995. Informally known as the American Cancer Society study, it found that long-term exposure to particulates was linked to cardiopulmonary and lung cancer mortality.

== Awards ==
In 2004 Pope was awarded the Utah Governor's Medal in Science and Technology.

In 2006 Pope was recognized as BYU's distinguished faculty, receiving the Karl G. Maeser award.

== See also ==
- Air quality in Utah
