= Houdini (sailboat) =

Sailboat class

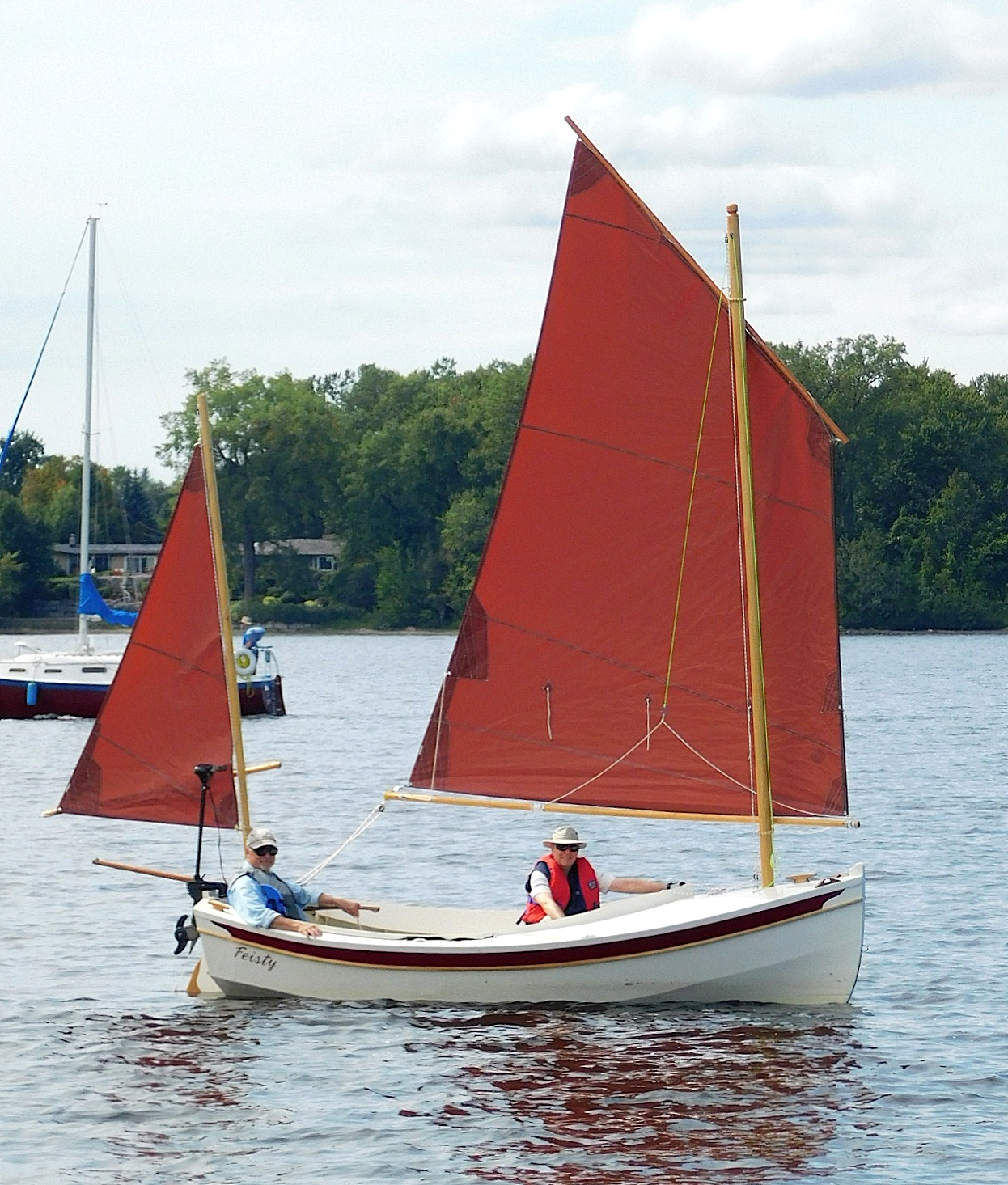
- Houdini lug sail yawl

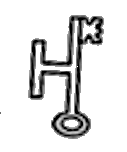

Development
- Designer: John Welsford
- Location: New Zealand
- Year: 2011
- Builder: amateur builders
- Name: Houdini

Boat
- Displacement: 187 lb (85 kg)

Hull
- Type: monohull
- Construction: plywood
- LOA: 13.45 ft (4.10 m)
- Beam: 5.91 ft (1.80 m)
- Engine: optional outboard motor

Hull appendages
- Keel: centreboard
- Rudder: transom-mounted rudder

Rig
- Rig type: Lug rig

Sails
- Sailplan: lug sail
- Mainsail area: 115.17 sq ft (10.700 m^{2})
- Total sail area: 115.17 sq ft (10.700 m^{2})

The Houdini is a New Zealand sailing dinghy that was designed by John Welsford as a cruiser and first built in 2011.

The boat's designer intended it as an "escape machine" and so named it in honour of Harry Houdini.

== Production ==
The design is supplied in the form of plans. It has been built by amateur builders and also by some professional builders on a custom basis.

== Design ==
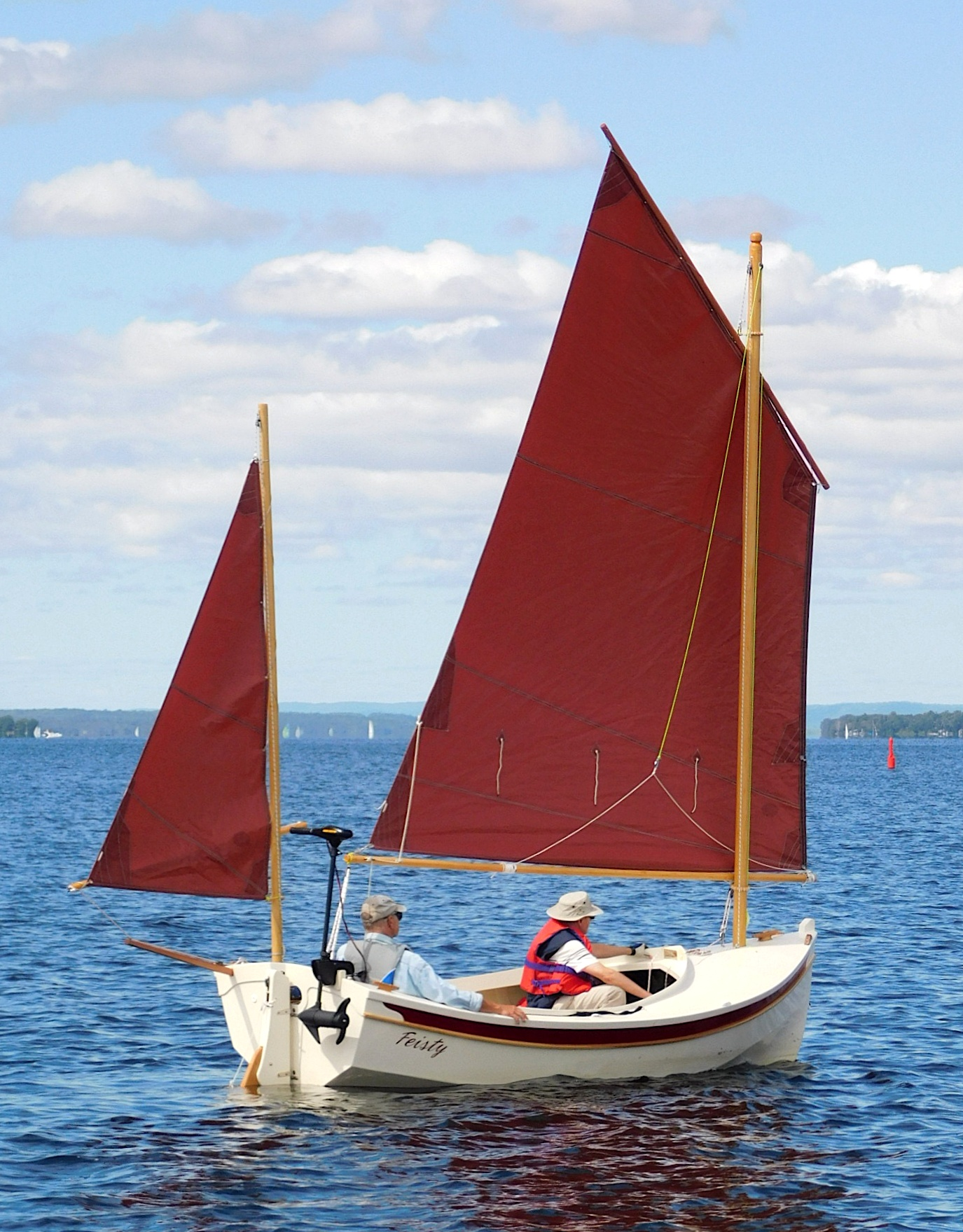
A Houdini, showing the transom. This boat has a Minn Kota electric motor.

The boat was designed for camping on-shore and provides stowage space to take a large amount of camping gear. It can accommodate four people for camping-cruising or up to seven people for day sailing. The design has sleeping accommodation for two adults under a boom tent.

The Houdini is a recreational sailboat, built predominantly of wood, with a plywood hull and wooden spars and trim. The prototype used bamboo spars. It has a lug sail rig and can be fitted with a mizzen mast and sail as a yawl. It has a pronounced sheer, a plumb stem, a vertical transom, a transom-hung rudder controlled by a tiller and a retractable centreboard. It displaces 187 lb (85 kg). A cuddy cabin is optional.

The boat may be optionally fitted with an outboard engine for docking and maneuvering.

Boats have also been completed with gaff rigs and sloop rigs.

== See also ==
- List of sailing boat types

Similar sailboats

- Naiad 18
