= Charles Fuchs (lithographer) =

German lithographer and photographer

Carl Friedrich Fuchs (28 October 1803 – 5 March 1874) was a German lithographer and photographer based in Hamburg.

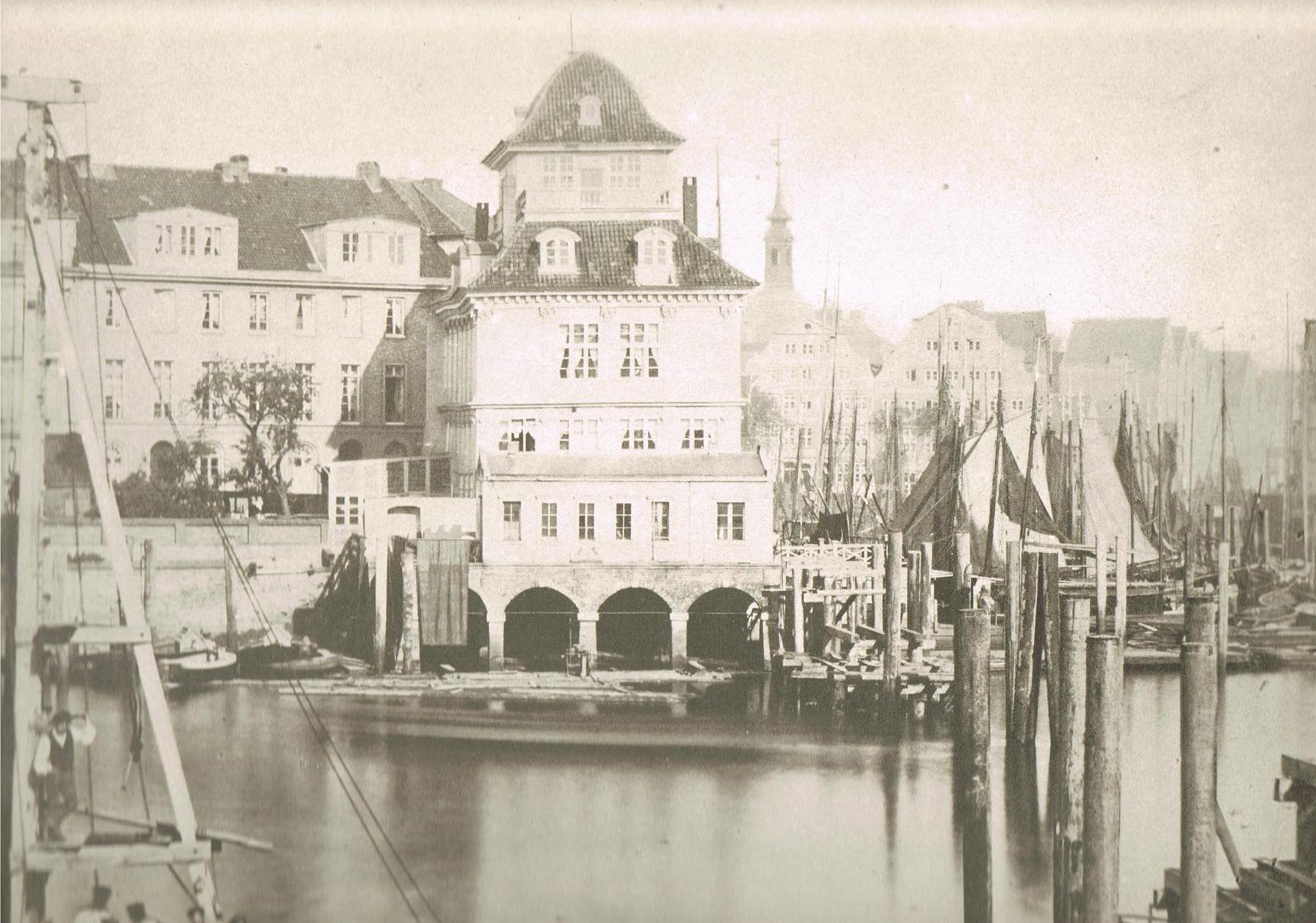
Charles Fuchs, Das Baumhaus (von Kehrwieder aus), 1848

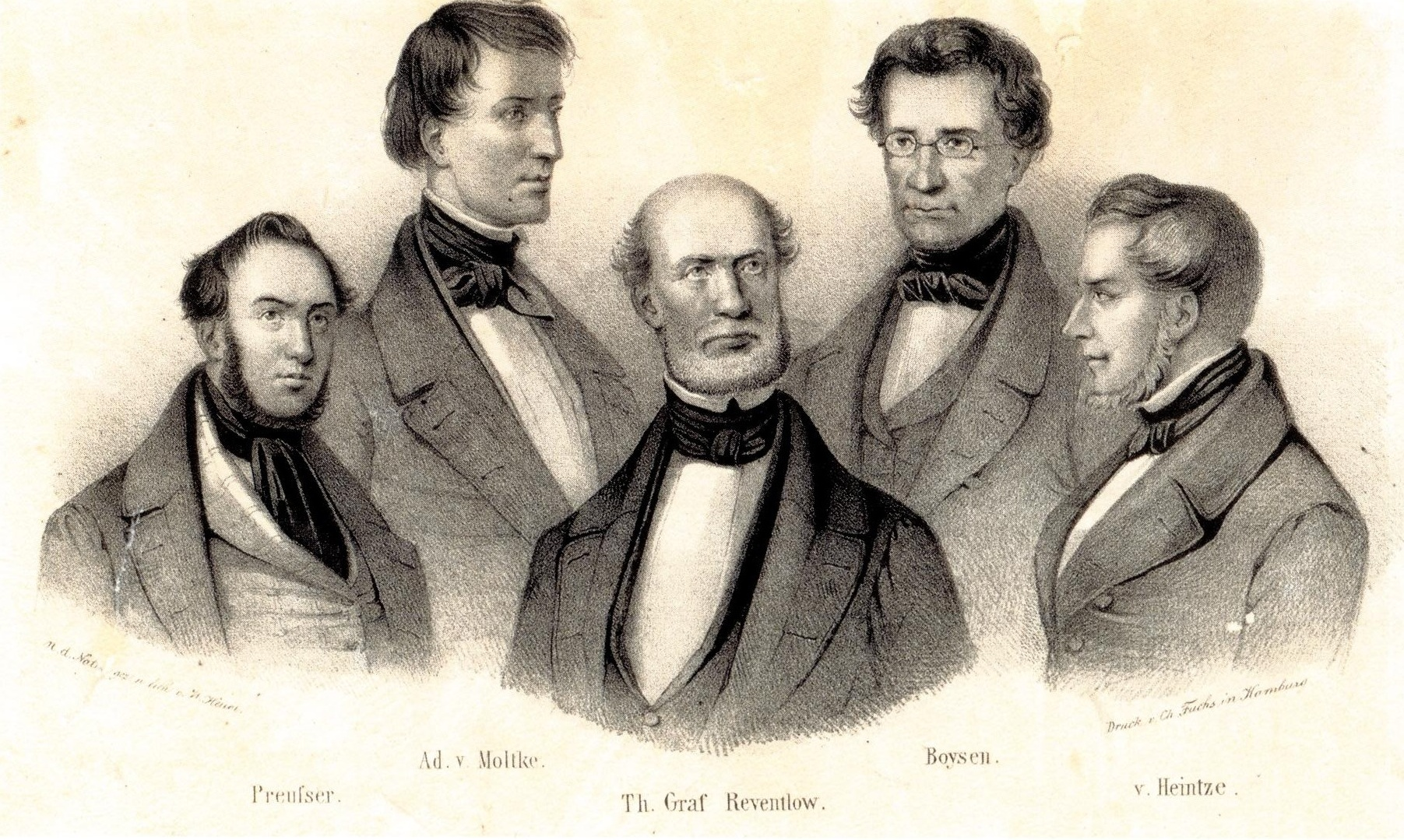
Charles Fuchs, lithograph of the Gemeinsame Regierung Schleswig-Holstein 1849

== Life ==
Born in Bordeaux, Fuchs grew up in Hamburg at the beginning of the 19th century under difficult family circumstances. At the age of 25, he came to Frankfurt via stations that were not always known. There, he learned the art of lithography from Fr Emile Simon from Strasbourg. A little later he married Simon's daughter and Frenchified his first name.

=== Lithographic Institute of Charles Fuchs ===
Around 1832, Fuchs opened a lithographic institute in Hamburg, since the privilege of the Speckter family had fallen in 1828 to be the only ones allowed to produce lithographs. Fuchs quickly became one of the most important lithographers in Hamburg, alongside the brothers Christoffer, Cornelius and Peter Suhr.

After Fuchs' death in 1874 at the age of 69, a son-in-law continued to run the lithographic establishment until shortly after the turn of the century. Numerous views of the city and buildings of Hamburg, popularly known as "Hamburgensie", bear the inscription "Druck des Lith. Inst. v. Ch. Fuchs, Hamburg" and are still preserved today. Friedrich Wilhelm Graupenstein had his lithographs printed at the institute, so that portraits of many Hamburg personalities also bear the inscription.

== Portraits ==
- Porträt Charles Fuchs, Ch. Fuchs (Hamburg), Lithographische Anstalt, (Faktischer Entstehungsort:) Hamburg um 1840, Lithograph, 308 × 253 mm, (online Digitaler Porträtindex, Bildarchiv Foto Marburg)
- Porträt Charles Fuchs, Ch. Fuchs (Hamburg), Lithographische Anstalt, (Faktischer Entstehungsort:) Hamburg um 1840, Lithograph, 308 × 253 mm, (online Digitaler Porträtindex, Bildarchiv Foto Marburg)
