= Charles S. Fuchs =

American oncologist

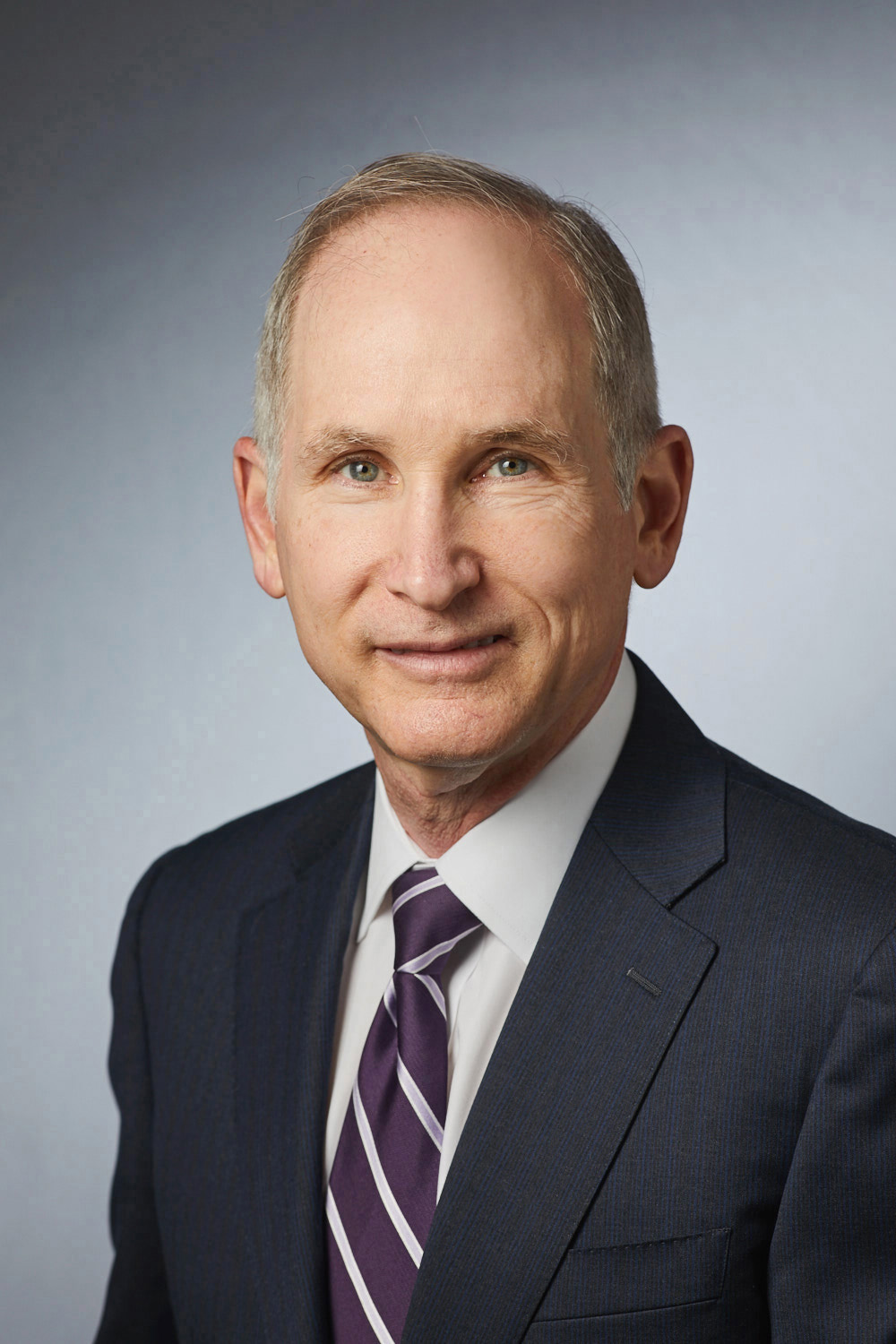
Charles S. Fuchs

Charles S. Fuchs is an American oncologist. From 2016 to 2021 he was director of the Yale Cancer Center in New Haven, Connecticut, Sackler professor of medicine at the Yale School of Medicine, and physician-in-chief of the Smilow Cancer Hospital. He left Yale to work for the Hoffman-La Roche group of companies. From 1987 to 1993 he was a resident at Brigham and Women’s Hospital.

He has worked on gastrointestinal cancers and on cancer epidemiology, and has published results of research on colorectal cancer.
