= Nurses' Health Study =

Prospective studies in epidemiology

- Study type: Multiple prospective cohorts
- Dates: 1976; 1989; 2010
- Locations: United States and Canada
- Lead researcher: Frank E. Speizer; Walter Willett; Jorge Chavarro
- Funding: US National Institutes of Health and others

The Nurses' Health Study is a series of prospective studies that examine epidemiology and the long-term effects of nutrition, hormones, environment, and nurses' work-life on health and disease development. The studies have been among the largest investigations into risk factors for major chronic diseases ever conducted. The Nurses' Health Studies have led to many insights on health and well-being, including cancer prevention, cardiovascular disease, and type 2 diabetes. They have included clinicians, epidemiologists, and statisticians at the Channing Laboratory (of Brigham and Women's Hospital), Harvard Medical School, Harvard School of Public Health, and several Harvard-affiliated hospitals, including Brigham and Women's Hospital, Dana–Farber Cancer Institute, Children's Hospital Boston, and Beth Israel Deaconess Medical Center.

== Cohorts ==
Cohorts
Study	Year	PI	Enrollees
Nurses' Health Study	1976	Frank Speizer	121,700
Nurses' Health Study II	1989	Walter Willett	116,430
Nurses' Health Study 3	2010	Jorge Chavarro	target: 100,000

The Nurses' Health Study original cohort was established in 1976 by Frank E. Speizer. Initially, the study investigated contraceptive use, smoking, cancer, and cardiovascular disease. The 1976 baseline group included married female registered nurses between the ages of 30 and 55. Approximately 121,700 participants in 11 of the most populous U.S. states (California, Connecticut, Florida, Maryland, Massachusetts, Michigan, New Jersey, New York, Ohio, Pennsylvania, and Texas) responded. The survey was then distributed biennially thereafter. Over the years, the principal investigator of the Nurses' Health Study have been Frank Speizer, Graham Colditz, Sue Hankinson, and Meir Stampfer.

Over time, the study expanded. Most notably, a dietary questionnaire was added in 1980 due to investigators recognizing the impact of diet and nutrition on the development of chronic disease. Blood, urine, saliva, and other physical samples were received and tested beginning in 1982. Experimenters followed up reports of morbidity using the National Death Index. Where possible and permitted, cancer diagnoses were reviewed. Although reports of other diseases were not followed up, self-reporting has been confirmed by medical records and doctors unaware of the answers to the study's questions.

The Nurses' Health Study II was established in 1989 by Walter Willett, who has been its principal investigator since inception. The focus of the study was women's health, especially the long term adverse effects of oral contraceptives. The sample population contained females within the age range of 25–42, employed as nurses, from 14 U.S. States. Data collected included the brand of pill and length of use. Over time, the study expanded to include information on basic practices and measurements of health, such as exercise practices and food intake.

Between the years of 1996 and 1999, approximately 30,000 nurses volunteered to provide blood and urine samples to the study. Of these women, 18,500 were pre-menopausal, providing samples at specific points in the menstrual cycle. These data allowed researchers to study how hormone levels influence the risk of disease. A second set of samples was collected from 16,500 of the same group of women in 2010–2012, by which time most of them were postmenopausal. Over 25,000 children of women in the Nurses' Health Study II cohort were enrolled in their own follow-up study called the Growing Up Today Study, or GUTS, which has followed the subjects through their early life so as to obtain a second generation of data.

The Nurses' Health Study 3 was developed in 2010 by Drs. Jorge Chavarro, Walter Willett, Janet Rich-Edwards, and Stacey Missmer. The study includes investigators from the Channing Division of Network Medicine at Brigham and Women's Hospital, Harvard Medical School, and Harvard T.H. Chan School of Public Health. The original population contained females 19–49 in age and expanded to include Canadian subjects. Unlike the predecessor studies, the NH3 includes participants of both male and female genders in 2015. Jorge Chavarro has been the principal investigator of Nurses' Health Study 3 since its 2010 inception.

== Findings ==
The studies revealed many correlations, that is statistical relationships, whether causal or not, between environmental factors and risk for health conditions.

Smoking: correlated to a higher likelihood of cardiovascular disease (CVD), colorectal and pancreatic cancer, psoriasis, multiple sclerosis, type 2 diabetes, and eye disease.

Trans Fats: correlation between cardiovascular disease (CVD) and consumption of trans fatty acids. Initially met with skepticism, it ultimately led to trans fat being added to U.S. food labels in 2003 and partially hydrogenated oils being labeled as not generally recognized as safe (GRAS) by the FDA.

Obesity: correlated to a higher likelihood of cardiovascular disease (CVD), breast cancer, pancreatic cancer, psoriasis, multiple sclerosis, gallstones, type 2 diabetes, and eye disease.

Postmenopausal Hormone Therapy: correlated to a lower likelihood of cardiovascular disease (CVD). Combination hormones (progesteron and estrogen) were associated with higher risk of breast cancer.

Oral Contraceptives: correlated to a lower likelihood of ovarian cancer. No statistically significant effects of oral contraceptives were observed in regard to risk of breast cancer. Present or past use did not correlate significantly with CVD.

Exercise: correlated to higher likelihood of breast cancer survival. Physical activity was correlated to a decreased likelihood of cardiovascular disease (CVD) and type 2 diabetes.

Many relationships and factors were examined over the course of the study, examples including diet, coffee consumption, and sleep. Many publications diverse findings were produced as a result.

== History ==
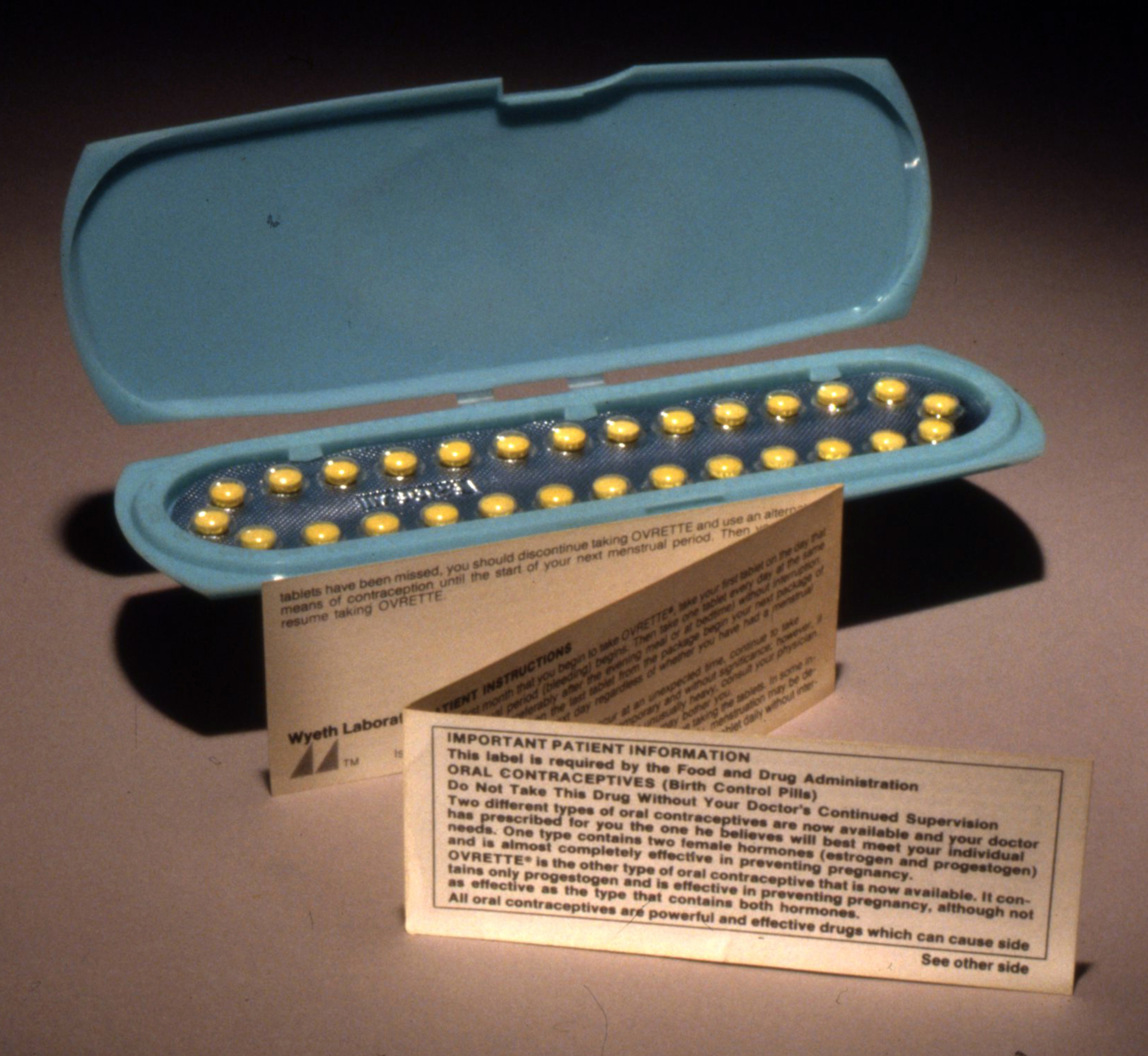
Oral Contraceptives publicly used in the United States in the 1970s

Beginning in the 1960s, oral contraceptives were used by the public in the U.S. and U.K. As soon as 1966, however, there were reports of women falling ill with cardiovascular disease in association with these contraceptives. Doctors Frank Speizer and Martin Vessey hoped to better understand the effects of long-term use of oral contraceptives on the health of women. After receiving funding from the National Cancer Institute in 1974, the study was directed towards the wives of doctors. When it was discovered that such responses were not ideal due to lack of medical knowledge of the participants, the study shifted its focus to nurses. The studies did not remain focused on oral contraceptives, but expanded to investigate factors such as smoking, diet, and exercise. These conditions demonstrated relationships with states of health, such as risk of developing chronic disease. Because the women continued submitting their responses as time passed, the Nurses' Health Study was the first cohort study of such magnitude to follow a population over time. The study has continued into 2018, and as of 2016 were funded almost entirely (90%) by the federal government.

== Impact ==
Data received from the study has expanded the understanding of women's health. Public messages from the United States Surgeon General, World Health Organization, and World Cancer Research Fund have resulted from the findings of the Nurses' Health Study. Policies such as the 2008 Physical Activity Guidelines for Americans and the Dietary Guidelines of the Food and Drug Administration regarding trans-fat related to the findings of these studies. Studies to date have led to the publication of hundreds of peer-reviewed papers. Influential figures in the Nurses' Health Study have published advice for women based on their findings. For example, the book Healthy Women and Healthy Lives was written by Hankson, Colditz, Manson, and Speizer to reflect results of the study. This work makes explicit suggestions for a healthy lifestyle based on the study.

== Public reaction ==
This study was referenced in popular news by many sources. The term "Nurses' Health Study" has been stated in over three hundred articles of the New York Times and The Washington Post alone. These articles discussed the findings of the study, such as one titled Women, Alcohol and the Search for Certainty. Published as early as 1988, this Washington Post article discussed the effect of the Nurses' Health Study on the relationship between women and alcohol, citing the former as a factor which affects a woman's risk for CVD and strokes. News outlets have also described the more general implications of the study, such as a piece titled It's Never Too Late to Be Healthy, Studies Show. The 2004 article discusses the research of the study and resulting understanding of general health in older populations. The impact of the study itself was also in the public eye. In the New York Times article In Nurses' Lives, a Treasure Trove of Health Data, nurses themselves were cited as changing daily habits and considering their choices as a result of their participation. In this way, the findings and magnitude of the Nurses Health Study reached the public throughout its history.

== Limitations and controversy ==
The Nurses' Health Study 1 contained populations representing nurses of the time, but did not reflect great diversity. The participants had a slightly higher income than the average of the time and a majority were white (97%). In 2012, however, minority participants were increasingly sought after. Leaders of the experiment made this a priority by sending extra information on the study to possible subjects living in areas of high diversity. In 2015 males were accepted into the study. This was caused by an increase in the number of males in the nursing profession.

The Nurses' Health Study faced controversy based on its recommendations. The study published in 1985 that taking estrogen as a part of Hormone Replacement Therapy would lead to large decreases in risk of heart disease (a third of the risk of those who did not take supplements). However, the Framingham Heart Study found the opposite result. This controversy caused a 10-year follow up by the Nurses' Health Study which again concluded that risks of CVD were lower in samples currently taking hormones. However, further studies such as the Heart and Estrogen-progestin Replacement Study found that estrogen tablets actually increase risk for heart disease. This was a double-blind trial following an experimental group of women who were given replacement therapy pills and a control group following the same procedure with placebos. Findings from the study displayed a direct relationship between therapy and risk for heart disease, as opposed to the previously stated benefits. This finding largely opposed the published Nurses' Health Study conclusion.

== See also ==
- British Doctors Study
- Framingham Heart Study
