= Douglas Dockery =

American epidemiologist

Douglas W. Dockery
- Education: University of Maryland
- Known for: Harvard Six Cities study
- Scientific career
- Fields: Environmental health; Epidemiology
- Workplaces: Harvard University
- Website: Official website

Douglas William Dockery is an American epidemiologist and the John L. Loeb and Frances Lehman Loeb Professor of Environmental Epidemiology, Emeritus, at the Harvard School of Public Health (HSPH). He is known for his contributions to understanding the health effects of air pollution.

== Education ==
Dockery received his B.S. in physics from the University of Maryland and his M.S. in meteorology from the Massachusetts Institute of Technology in 1972, where he studied under biometeorologist Helmut Landsberg. He further pursued meteorology at the Massachusetts Institute of Technology (MIT) under the guidance of Edward Lorenz, completing a master's thesis on the predictability of atmospheric models in 1972. Dockery continued his education at the Harvard School of Public Health, obtaining both a Master of Science (M.S.) and a Doctor of Science (Sc.D.) in Environmental Science. His doctoral research, supervised by John Spengler, focused on personal exposures to fine particulate matter.

== Career ==
After working as an air pollution meteorologist at the Environmental Protection Agency (EPA), Dockery joined the faculty at Harvard School of Public Health where he became heavily involved with the Harvard Six Cities Study. He began as a research fellow and progressed to Principal Investigator of the study in 1988. Dockery's career at Harvard saw him promoted to assistant professor in 1987, associate professor in 1990, and full professor in 1998. In 2014, he was named the John L. Loeb and Frances Lehman Loeb Professor of Environmental Epidemiology. He also chaired the Department of Environmental Health from 2005-2016, and directed the Harvard-NIEHS Center for Environmental Health Sciences from 2008-2019.

== Research ==
In the 1970s and 80s, Dockery led the Harvard Six Cities study, the results of which were published in 1993 in the New England Journal of Medicine. In the study, Dockery and his co-authors (including C. Arden Pope) reported that air pollution was associated with increased mortality. The results of this study have been used by the Environmental Protection Agency as the basis for their regulations on fine particulate matter in 1997, and, as of 2005, was the most-cited air-pollution study ever published. In 2009, Dockery co-authored another study which found that improvements in air quality in 51 American cities had led to life expectancies of people living there increasing by as much as five months.

Dockery's pioneering research significantly advanced the understanding of air pollution's health impacts:

- Indoor Air Pollution: His early studies quantified fine particles and nitrogen dioxide exposure, highlighting their effects on children's respiratory health.
- Growth and Decline of Lung Function: Through the Harvard Six Cities Study, Dockery documented lung function growth in children and its decline in adults due to air pollution and smoking.
- Respiratory and Cardiovascular Effects: The Six Cities Study revealed adverse respiratory health effects of fine particulate air pollution, which later research extended to include significant cardiovascular impacts.
- Mortality and Life Expectancy: Dockery's work demonstrated associations between particulate air pollution and increased mortality, contributing crucial evidence for establishing the National Ambient Air Quality Standards (NAAQS) for PM10 and PM2.5.

== Impact and Controversy ==
Dockery's research influenced major air quality regulatory policies, including the 1987 PM10 standards and the PM2.5 standards developed in the 1990s. Despite criticism and data access demands from various opponents, including industry groups and legislators, Dockery's findings were independently validated, reinforcing their credibility. Notably, a Health Effects Institute (HEI) expert panel confirmed Dockery's conclusions about the mortality impacts of PM2.5 exposure.

His research significantly influenced regulations aimed at improving air quality, and accountability studies have demonstrated measurable health benefits from decreased pollution levels. However, his work encountered opposition in the form of legislative proposals aimed at requiring public disclosure of underlying data for regulatory science, such as the 2018 "Strengthening Transparency in Regulatory Science" proposal.

== Legacy ==
Douglas Dockery retired in 2016, transitioning to the role of Research Professor before being honored as Professor Emeritus in 2023. His work has not only advanced scientific understanding but also informed public health policies worldwide, contributing to improved air quality and public health globally.

== Awards ==
- 1999 - John Goldsmith Award for Outstanding Contributions to Environmental Epidemiology
- 2010 - Best Environmental Epidemiology Paper Award 2021 Inaugural ISEE Fellow
- 2024 - Professor Emeriti Award

== Selected Publications ==
An association between air pollution and mortality in six US cities DW Dockery, CA Pope, X Xu, JD Spengler, JH Ware, ME Fay, BG Ferris Jr, New England journal of medicine 1993; 329 (24), 1753-1759

Particulate air pollution as a predictor of mortality in a prospective study of US adults CA Pope, MJ Thun, MM Namboodiri, DW Dockery, JS Evans, FE Speizer, ... American journal of respiratory and critical care medicine 1995;151 (3), 669-674

Health effects of fine particulate air pollution: lines that connect CA Pope III, DW Dockery Journal of the air & waste management association 2006; 56 (6), 709-742

Effect of air-pollution control on death rates in Dublin, Ireland: an intervention study L Clancy, P Goodman, H Sinclair, DW Dockery The Lancet 2002; 360 (9341), 1210-1214

Reduction in fine particulate air pollution and mortality: extended follow-up of the Harvard Six Cities study F Laden, J Schwartz, FE Speizer, DW Dockery American journal of respiratory and critical care medicine 2006; 173 (6), 667-672

Fine-particulate air pollution and life expectancy in the United States CA Pope III, M Ezzati, DW Dockery New England Journal of Medicine 2009; 360 (4), 376-386

Increased particulate air pollution and the triggering of myocardial infarction A Peters, DW Dockery, JE Muller, MA Mittleman Circulation 2001; 103 (23), 2810-2815

Air pollution and daily mortality: associations with particulates and acid aerosols DW Dockery, J Schwartz, JD Spengler Environmental Research 1992; 59 (2), 362-373

Increased mortality in Philadelphia associated with daily air pollution concentrations J Schwartz, DW Dockery Am Rev Respir Dis 1992; 145 (3), 600-604

Particulate air pollution and daily mortality in Steubenville, Ohio J Schwartz, DW Dockery American Journal of Epidemiology 1992; 135 (1), 12-19

Acute Health Effects of PM10 Pollution on Symptomatic and Asymptomatic Children CA Pope III, DW Dockery American review of respiratory disease 1992; 145 (5), 1123-1128

Particles of Truth: A Story of Discovery, Controversy, and the Fight for Healthy Air Pope CA 3rd, Dockery DW. MIT Press, April 2025, pp 241.
