= Philip Chen Nan-lok =

Hong Kong businessman

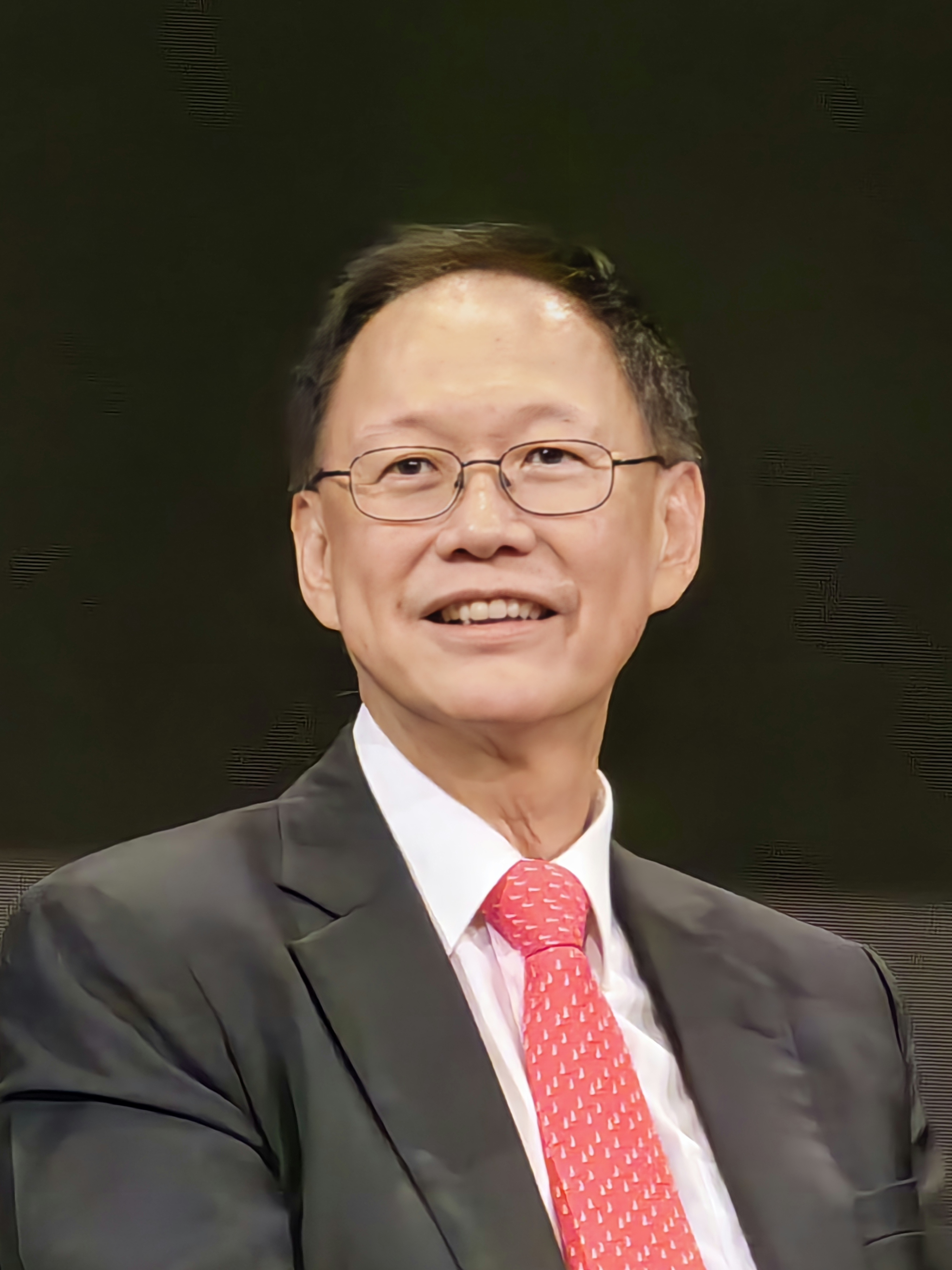
Philip Chen at 2023 Hong Kong Book Fair

Philip Chen Nan-lok, GBS, JP (Chinese: 陳南祿; born 1955 in Hong Kong) is a Hong Kong businessman, best known for being the first local Hong Kong Chinese Chief Executive Officer and later Deputy Chairman of Cathay Pacific. He has also held a number of senior business posts in Hong Kong, such as Executive Director of Swire Pacific, Chairman of Ocean Park, and Chief Executive Officer of Hang Lung Group and Hang Lung Properties. He was appointed Chairman of the Hong Kong Jockey Club in June 2020.

== Background ==
Chen finished his secondary study at Wah Yan College, an eminent Roman Catholic Jesuit school in Hong Kong. He moved on to The University of Hong Kong (HKU), living at one time in Ricci Hall, and graduated in 1977 with a Honours Degree in Political Science and History. After graduation he joined Cathay Pacific and was assigned to overseas posts in such places including Tokyo and Beijing. In 1984, he received an MBA degree from HKU.

He was appointed by Swire Pacific as Chief Representative and General Manager of John Swire & Sons (China) in 1989.Chen returned to Cathay Pacific in 1992 and became Regional General Manager for Southeast Asia based in Singapore. In 1994, he was seconded to Hong Kong Dragon Airlines (Dragonair), a subsidiary of Cathay Pacific, assuming the post of Chief Executive. He returned to Cathay Pacific as Deputy Managing Director in 1997 and Chief Operating Officer in 1998. At end-2004, he succeeded David Turnbull to become the first Chinese taking up the chief executive post.

Under his reins, through a successful merger with Dragonair in a share swap, Cathay Pacific managed to foster relationship with Air China and forayed into Mainland China. This series of orchestrations were widely regarded as Chen's highest achievement in his tenure, which cemented Cathay Pacific's long-term growth as a regional hub airline.

He was appointed as the Chairman of the Hong Kong Ocean Park between 2000 and 2003 and was responsible for its business turnaround from major losses into profits. This success laid a solid foundation for the famous theme park to move forward. He was subsequently appointed to the board of Hong Kong Disney.

Since August 2006, Chen has been serving as a Steward of the Hong Kong Jockey Club. The same month also saw him appointed as Director of Hong Kong Disneyland for two years. On 8 March 2007, a day after Cathay Pacific announced its 2006 annual results, the company announced that Chen would cease to be Chief Executive effective 1 July 2007. Same day, he was appointed as the Chairman of John Swire & Sons (China), a subsidiary of Swire Pacific, and Board Director of Swire Properties and Swire Beverages. He remained as the non-executive Deputy Chairman of the board of Cathay Pacific.

On 19 April 2010, Cathay Pacific announced Chen resigned as Non-Executive Deputy Chairman for personal reasons. Swire Pacific also announced Chen's resignation as Executive Director ending his 33 years' career with Swire.

On 27 April 2010, Chen was appointed as Chief Executive Officer of Hang Lung Group and Hang Lung Properties effective 15 July 2010. He has taken charge of Hang Lung's businesses in Hong Kong and mainland China and has successfully built up and strengthened its management system and corporate brand, moving Hang Lung forward into the future.

=== Senior Roles Held ===
- Chief Executive Officer of Dragonair (1994–1997)
- Chairman of Ocean Park (2000–2003)
- Chief Executive Officer of Cathay Pacific (2005–2007)
- Executive Director of Swire Pacific (2005–2010)
- Chairman of John Swire & Sons (China) (2007–2010)
- Chief Executive Officer of Hang Lung Group and Hang Lung Properties (2010–2018)
- Chairman of the Hong Kong Jockey Club (2020– )

== Public Service ==
Between January 1997 and December 2002, Chen sat on the Citizen Advisory Committee on Community Relations of the Independent Commission Against Corruption (ICAC) and served as a convenor of its Community Liaison Sub-committee. After he retired from the ICAC service for a year, he was called back to chair the Commission's Corruption Prevention Advisory Committee and served as a member of the Advisory Committee on Corruption for another six years. He was also the Chairman of the Organising Committee of Ethics Programme for the Travel and Tourism Industry.

He is a Member of Board and Executive Committee of The Real Estate Developers Association of Hong Kong, Member of the Taiwan/Hong Kong Business Co-operation Committee, Member of the Hong Kong-Japan Business Co-operation Committee, Honorary President of the Hong Kong Association of China Travel Organisers Limited, Standing Committee Member of the Hong Kong Chinese Chamber of Commerce. He is the Founder and Honorary President of the Hong Kong Chamber of Commerce in Beijing. Chen is a Steward of the Hong Kong Jockey Club, Vice Patron of the Hong Kong Community Chest and a Director of the China Overseas Friendship Association and Shanghai Chinese Overseas Friendship Association.

Chen is a Member of the Hong Kong University of Science and Technology Business School Advisory Council (where he was Vice Chairman of the Council), Lingnan (University) College, Sun Yat-sen University International Advisory Board as well as the Advisory Board Member of the Nanyang Business School of Nanyang Technological University, Singapore. He is an adjunct professor and Member of the Advisory Committee on Hotel and Tourism Management of The Chinese University of Hong Kong, Visiting Professor of the Institute of Management by the Civil Aviation Administration of China and Visiting Professor of Wong Sam Hang China America Education Management College of Yunnan University. Chen also served on the Stanford University Graduate School of Business Advisory Board from 2006 to 2011.

He has served on many public body boards including the Hong Kong Trade Development Council, Hong Kong Tourism Board, Aviation Advisory Committee, The University Grants Committee. Chen was also Founding Chairman of the Quality Assurance Council while he was on The University Grants Committee. He was Chairman of Travel Industry Council, Board of Airline Representatives and was a member of the Executive Committee of International Air Transport Association.

== Family ==
Chen is married to Wu Suk-yan, Anita, daughter of Hong Kong Maxim's founder James Tak Wu, with a son and a daughter.

== Publications ==
Since 2000, Chen has written articles for a column in Wen Wei Po sharing his overseas travel experience and has published them under the following titles:

- 藍天綠地 ISBN 988201481X
- 寫我遊情 ISBN 9882018130
- 風花說日 ISBN 9882111688
- 雲濤偶拾 ISBN 9789882115644
- 獅城畫意 ISBN 9882116841
- 美人美事 ISBN 9789882190603
- 中東南北
- Great Cities of the World ISBN 9789628269501

The royalties from the book sales have been donated to two charities - Cathay Pacific Wheelchair Bank and Sunnyside Club.

== Horse ownership ==
Chen is a Steward of the Hong Kong Jockey Club and has owned a few horses, including Carpe Diem, Seize The Day and Take the Current.

== Honours ==
- Fellow of the Royal Aeronautical Society of the UK in 1997
- Honoree of the Beta Gamma Sigma awarded by The Hong Kong University of Science and Technology in 2001
- Justice of the Peace awarded in 2000
- Silver Bauhinia Star awarded in 2002
- Honorary Doctor of Business Administration awarded by The Hong Kong University of Science and Technology in 2004
- Fellow of the Hong Kong Management Association in 2004
- Distinction of Officier de l’Ordre National du Mérite bestowed by the French Government in 2009
- Distinguished Alumni Fellowship awarded by University of Hong Kong School of Professional and Continuing Education in 2009
- Honorary Member of Eta Sigma Delta Chapter awarded by The Chinese University of Hong Kong in 2010
- Gold Bauhinia Star awarded in 2012
- University Fellow of University of Hong Kong in 2013
- Honorary Doctor of Business Administration awarded by Lingnan University in 2014
- Honorary Member of Beta Gamma Sigma Honouree awarded by University of Hong Kong in 2016
