= Ronnie Chan =

Hong Kong businessman (born 1949)

Ronnie Chan GBM
- 陳啟宗
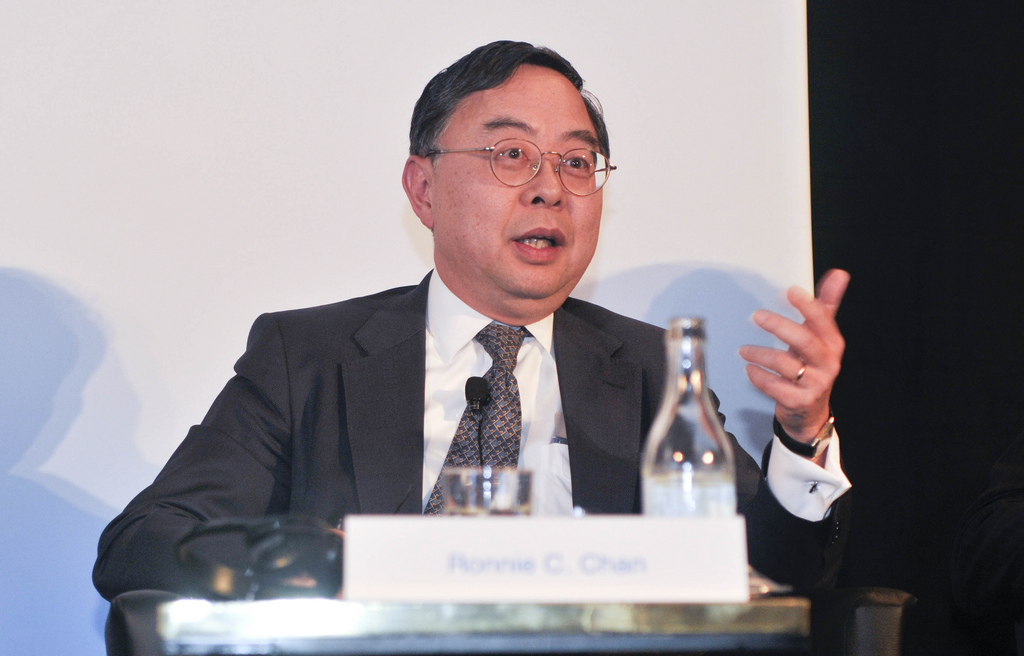
- Ronnie Chan in 2009
- Born: Chan Chi-chung; 1949 (age 76–77); British Hong Kong
- Education: California State University, Los Angeles (BS, MS); University of Southern California (MBA)
- Occupation: Property developer
- Spouse: Barbara Chan
- Children: 2
- Parent: Chan Tseng-hsi
- Relatives: Gerald Chan (brother)

Ronnie Chan Chi-chung
- Traditional Chinese: 陳啟宗
- Simplified Chinese: 陈启宗
Transcriptions
Standard Mandarin
- Hanyu Pinyin: Chén Qǐzōng
Yue: Cantonese
- Jyutping: can4 kai2 zung1

Ronnie Chan Chi-chung GBM (Chinese: 陳啟宗; born 1949) is a Hong Kong businessman.

== Education ==
Chan earned bachelor's and master's degrees in biology from California State University, Los Angeles. He received an MBA from the University of Southern California in 1976.

Chan was given honorary doctorates by Tel Aviv University, the Hong Kong University of Science and Technology and the Chinese University of Hong Kong.

== Career ==
In 1991, he became the chairman of Hang Lung Group and its subsidiary Hang Lung Properties. As of 2014, it was one of the largest real estate developers in Hong Kong. He succeeded the chairman position in the companies from his uncle. He is also the vice-president of the Real Estate Developers Association of Hong Kong, a co-chairman of the Asia Society and chairman of its Hong Kong Center, and an advisor to the China Development Research Foundation of the State Council of the People's Republic of China.

He has served on the governing or advisory bodies of several think-tanks and universities, including China Foreign Affairs University, the Hong Kong University of Science and Technology and his alma mater, the University of Southern California.

He was a director of Enron Corporation and a member of its audit committee when it filed for bankruptcy as a result of fraud. In November 2009, he attended the Horasis Global China Business Meeting in Lisbon, where his criticisms of American financial policy garnered widespread attention.

== Political views ==
Through his companies' multiple votes on Hong Kong's democratic 'Election Committee', Chan supported Carrie Lam for the role of Chief Executive. But in 2019, during the massive protests that rocked the territory, he opined that having a civil servant in the role was the "most ridiculous thing" and that Lam's "unwise policies" had contributed to the unrest, which he emphasised was caused by political, not social, issues. He also supported Leung Chun-ying in the 2013 election for chief executive.

He has stated that Hongkongers' "DNA is different from the mainlanders' because many escaped from there" and blamed a lack of national identity for the protests.

== Philanthropy ==
In 1996, Chan began providing yearly financial assistance to needy students at top universities in China.

In September 2014, Chan's family, through their Morningside Foundation, donated US$350 million and US$20 million to Harvard University and the University of Southern California, resulting in the naming of the Harvard T.H. Chan School of Public Health and Mrs. T.H. Chan Division of Occupational Science and Occupational Therapy, respectively.

In 2021, a US$175 million gift was bestowed by Morningside on the University of Massachusetts Medical School in Worcester, which was subsequently renamed UMass Chan Medical School. The constituent schools were likewise renamed to the T.H. Chan School of Medicine, the Tan Chingfen Graduate School of Nursing, and the Morningside Graduate School of Biomedical Sciences.

== Personal life ==
Chan's brother Gerald Chan is also a director of Hang Lung Group.

Chan is married to Barbara Chan and has two sons.

In 2004, Chan's son Adriel Chan received his bachelor's degree in international relations from USC. Chan's other son Adley Chan earned his bachelor's degree in sociology, as well as bachelor's, master's and doctorate degrees in occupational therapy from USC.
