= Margaret Herridge =

Canadian infectious disease specialist

- Born: 1961 (age 64–65)
- Spouse: Robert Stewart

Academic background
- Education: BSc, Biology, MSc, 1987, Queen's University at Kingston; MD, 1990, Queen's School of Medicine; MPH, Harvard T.H. Chan School of Public Health
- Thesis: Induction of an ulceroinflammatory state in the rat colon: studies on chronic transmural inflammation as a potential model for human Crohn's colitis (1987)

Academic work
- Institutions: University of Toronto; University Health Network; Toronto Grace Health Centre

Mary Margaret Sutherland Herridge (born 1961) FCAHS is a Canadian respirologist and intensivist. As a professor at the University of Toronto, she holds the Tier 1 Canada Research Chair in Critical Illness Outcomes and the Recovery Continuum. In recognition of her "international leadership in family and caregiver outcomes after critical illness," Herridge was elected a Fellow of the Canadian Academy of Health Sciences in 2021.

== Early life and education ==
Herridge was born in 1961. After earning a Bachelor of Science and a Master of Science degree, Herridge graduated from Queen's School of Medicine in 1990. She completed a two-year clinical fellowship in Toronto, and a two-year research fellowship at Brigham and Women's Hospital, where she also completed a Master's of Public Health.

== Career ==
In 2007, Herridge co-established the RECOVER program for post-ICU patients at university-affiliated ICUs in Toronto, Hamilton, Ottawa, Montreal, Sherbrooke, and Vancouver. In 2013, Herridge became a Professor of Critical Care and Respiratory Medicine at the University of Toronto and a Section Editor for the European Society of Intensive Care Medicine's Intensive Care Medicine publication. She received the 2018 Critical Care Lifetime Achievement Award from the American Thoracic Society for "a career devoted to research and teaching of the science and practice of Critical Care Medicine and outstanding service to the Assembly on Critical Care."

During the COVID-19 pandemic, Herridge collaborated with U of T colleague Angela Cheung to establish the Canadian COVID-19 Prospective Cohort study (CanCOV). As the primary investigators, they lead an interdisciplinary team studying the short- and long-term outcomes of COVID-19 patients by examining how genomics, demographics, social factors, and other variables influence disease progression and severity. In recognition of her "international leadership in family and caregiver outcomes after critical illness," Herridge was elected a Fellow of the Canadian Academy of Health Sciences in 2021.

Herridge was appointed a Tier 1 Canada Research Chair in Critical Illness Outcomes and the Recovery Continuum in 2022. She also received the 2022 CIHR-ICRH/CCCS Distinguished Lecturer Award in Critical Care Sciences.

== Personal life ==
Herridge is married to Robert Stewart, a fellow doctor at St. Michael’s Hospital. After her husband was diagnosed with liver failure in 2021, their friend and colleague Marie Faughnan donated her liver to him.
