= Gerald Chan =

Hong Kong born American billionaire

- 陳樂宗
- Born: Gerald Chan Lok-chung; February 1951 (age 75); Hong Kong
- Citizenship: United States
- Education: University of California, Los Angeles (BS, MS); Harvard University (MS, DSc)
- Occupation: Businessman
- Spouse: Beryl Wei Chan
- Children: 2
- Parent: T.H. Chan
- Relatives: Ronnie Chan (brother)

Gerald Lok-chung Chan (Chinese: 陳樂宗; born February 1951) is an American billionaire and the brother of fellow billionaire Ronnie Chan. They run the Hang Lung Group.

== Early life and education ==
Gerald Chan is the son of T.H. Chan, a Hong Kong real estate tycoon who founded the Hang Lung Group and was considered one of the major families in Hong Kong during the 20th century.

He received a bachelor of science and a master of science from the University of California, Los Angeles. He then received a master of science in medical radiological physics and a doctor of science in radiation biology from Harvard University.

In the 1970s, he became a US citizen, and has since been cited on various Forbes 400 rankings.

== Career ==
In 1987, he co-founded the Morningside Group, a private equity and venture capital group, and serves as its chairman.

Chan is also a director of Hang Lung Group, his family's real estate firm, Stealth Peptides, Advanced Cell Diagnostics, Matrivax, Vaccine Technologies Inc, and Oxyrane. He is also the chairman and founding investor of Apellis Pharmaceuticals, Inc. (Nasdaq:$APLS).

As of 2015, he had invested over $100 million into the real estate market in the Harvard Square district of Cambridge, the location of his alma mater.

In September 2018, Chan opened a countryside hotel, Heckfield Place, in Hampshire, England, a renovated 18th-century manor house and farm.

== Philanthropy ==
When his family donated the Harvard School of Public Health $350 million in six annual installments, the largest gift in Harvard's history at the time, the school was renamed the Harvard T.H. Chan School of Public Health in honor of Chan's late father.

In September 2021, the Chans' Morningside Foundation donated $175 million to the UMass Medical School in Worcester, MA, and it changed its name to UMass Chan Medical School.

In March 2022, the Morningside Foundation donated $100 million to found the MIT Morningside Academy for Design, intended to "encourage design work at MIT to grow and cross disciplines among engineering, science, management, computing, architecture, urban planning, and the arts."

== Personal life ==
Chan is married to Beryl, and they have two sons.
