= Harvard T.H. Chan School of Public Health =

Harvard University branch in Boston, Massachusetts, US

Coordinates: 42.335390°N 71.102793°W

- Coat of arms
- Former names: Harvard–MIT School for Health Officers (1913–1922); Harvard School of Public Health (1922–2014)
- Type: Private
- Established: 1913; 113 years ago
- Parent institution: Harvard University
- Dean: Andrea Baccarelli
- Location: Boston, Massachusetts, U.S.
- Website: hsph.harvard.edu

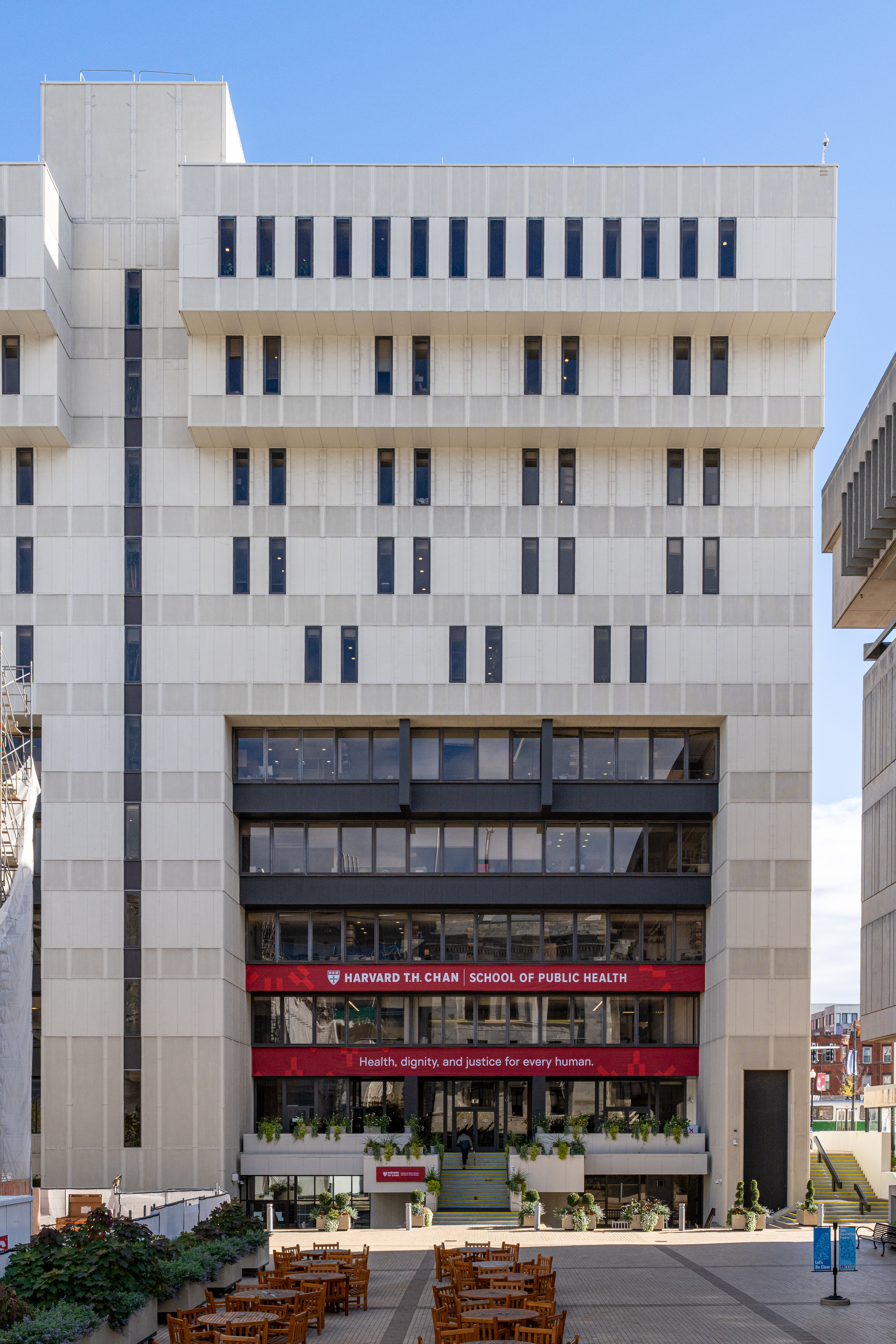
HSPH courtyard entrance from Harvard Medical School

The Harvard T.H. Chan School of Public Health is the public health school at Harvard University, located in the Longwood Medical Area of Boston, Massachusetts. It was named after Hong Kong entrepreneur Chan Tseng-hsi in 2014 following a US$350 million donation, the largest in Harvard's history at the time.

The school grew out of the Harvard–MIT School for Health Officers, the country's first graduate training program in population health, which was founded in 1913 and became the Harvard School of Public Health in 1922.

== History ==
=== 20th century ===
Harvard's T.H. Chan School of Public Health traces its origins to the Harvard–MIT School for Health Officers, which was founded in 1913. Harvard calls it "the nation's first graduate training program in public health." In 1922, the School for Health Officers became the Harvard School of Public Health.

The school was part of Harvard Medical School until 1946, when it became a fully autonomous institution with its own dedicated public health and medical faculty.

=== 21st century ===
In 2014, the Harvard School of Public Health was renamed the "Harvard T.H. Chan School of Public Health" in honor of a US$350 million donation, the largest in Harvard's history at the time, from the Morningside Foundation, run by Harvard School of Public Health alumnus Gerald Chan (Harvard SM '75, SD '79) and Ronnie Chan, both of whom were sons of Chan Tseng-hsi (T.H. Chan).

Announced in May 2016, beginning in fall 2017, the School of Public Health, in partnership with the Graduate School of Arts and Sciences, consolidated its five Doctor of Science (Sc.D.) research doctorate programs—Epidemiology, Environmental Health, Global Health and Population, Nutrition, and Social and Behavioral Sciences—into a single Doctor of Philosophy (Ph.D.) program in Population Health Sciences. Students already enrolled in Doctor of Science programs were not transitioned into the new program and constituted the final cohort to receive the research doctorate, concluding the degree's 144-year history at the Harvard University. Both the Doctor of Science and the Doctor of Philosophy degrees at Harvard University were first awarded in 1872, the year the university established what was then known as the Graduate Department.

In 2023 and 2024, the school partnered with the National Healthcare Security Administration to train members of the Xinjiang Production and Construction Corps (XPCC). The partnership led to United States congressional scrutiny in May 2025, as XPCC is sanctioned for human rights abuses under the Magnitsky Act.

== Curriculum ==
The Master of Public Health program offers ten fields of study:

- Clinical Effectiveness (CLE)
- Epidemiology (EPI)
- Generalist (GEN)
- Global Health and Population (GHP)
- Health and Social Behavior (HSB)
- Health Management (HM)
- Health Policy (HP)]
- Occupational and Environmental Health (OEH)
- Quantitative Methods (QM)
- Nutrition (NUT)

Degree programs offered by specific departments:

- Biostatistics: SM, PhD
- Environmental Health (EH): SM, MPH, PhD, DrPH
- Epidemiology (EPI): SM, DrPH
- Molecular Metabolism: PhD
- Health Policy: SM, MPH, PhD
- Health Care Management: SM, MPH
- Immunology and Infectious Diseases: PhD
- Nutrition (NUT): MPH, DrPH, PhD
- Global Health and Population (GHP): SM, MPH, PhD
- Social and Behavioral Sciences (SBS): SM, MPH, PhD, DrPH
- Population Health Sciences (Interdisciplinary PhD within departments of EH, EPI, GHP, NUT, and SBS)

The school offers a variety of degrees with criteria designed to target unique curriculum needs and a wide range of student populations, including online and hybrid degrees. The Harvard Chan School's master's of public health (MPH) and master's in health care management (MHCM) are designed for those aiming to spend their career in professional practice, while master's of science (SM) degrees are geared for aspiring researchers. The number of credit hours required for MPH and SM degrees depends on students’ prior academic training, such as whether they hold a bachelor's, master's, or doctoral degree.

In addition, the school offers two doctoral degrees: Doctor of Philosophy (PhD) and Doctor of Public Health (DrPH). PhD programs are offered under the aegis of the Harvard Graduate School of Arts and Sciences. Previously, the school also offered the Doctor of Science (ScD) degree, which has since been replaced by the centralized PhD offered through the Harvard Graduate School of Arts and Sciences.

The DrPH was launched in 2014 as a multidisciplinary degree providing advanced education in public health along with mastery of skills in management, leadership, communications, and innovation thinking. The program is a cohort-based program emphasizing small-group learning and collaboration. The program is designed for three years – two years at Harvard, plus one year in a field-based doctoral project – although some students may take up to four years to complete the program.

== Research projects ==
- The Nurses' Health Study and Nurses' Health Study II, which have followed the health of over 100,000 nurses from 1976 to the present; its results have been used in hundreds of published papers.
- The Health Professionals Follow-up Study, a similar study of over fifty thousand male health professionals seeking to connect diet, exercise, smoking, and medications taken to frequency of cancer and cardiovascular disease.
- The International Health Systems Program, which has provided training or technical assistance to projects in 21 countries and conducts health policy research.
- The Program on the Global Demography of Aging, which studies policy issues related to economics of aging with a focus on the developing world.
- The Lee Kum Sheung Center for Health and Happiness, to "help identify how positive aspects of living can lead to better health and a longer life" and "coordinate research across many disciplines at Harvard University" and "understanding the complex interplay between positive psychological well-being and human health."
- The Health Systems Innovation Lab, which specializes in comparative health systems research and transition to the high value health systems model through targeted innovation, policy and practice. Led by Prof. Rifat Atun, the Lab uses its research, education, innovation and translation activities to work with governments, private sector, multilateral entities, and civil society to promote policy and practice, and accelerate the diffusion of health system innovations for large-scale population level impact.
- The Harvard Center for Climate, Health, and the Global Environment (C-CHANGE) leads research projects that explore the impacts of climate change on human health and the design of climate actions to maximize health benefits, particularly for the most vulnerable populations.
- The Thich Nhat Hanh Center for Mindfulness in Public Health pursues evidence-based approaches to utilize the principles of mindfulness to improve health and well-being.
- The Center for Health Communication leads the Harvard Chan School's work to effectively communicate public health information through the clutter of modern media landscapes. The center's collaboration with Hollywood studios to promote designated drivers was essential in changing the national conversation around drunk driving. The center has recently launched a program partnering with content creators on mental health research.
- Harvard's Maternal and Child Health Center of Excellence, which is one of just 13 such centers funded by the Health Resources and Services Administration. The center produces and disseminates information to improve the well-being of mothers and children, and trains future leaders in the field as part of the school's concentration in maternal and child health.

== People ==
=== List of deans ===
The deans of the school are listed below.

No.	Name	Start	End
1	David L. Edsall	1922	1935
acting	Roger I. Lee	1922	1923
2	Cecil K. Drinker	1935	1942
acting	Edward G. Huber	1942	1946
3	James S. Simmons	1946	1954
4	John C. Snyder	1954	1971
acting	Richard H. Daggy	1971	1972
5	Howard H. Hiatt	1972	1984
6	Harvey V. Fineberg	1984	1997
acting	James H. Ware	1997	1998
7	Barry R. Bloom	1999	2008
8	Julio Frenk	2009	2015
acting	David Hunter	2015	2016
9	Michelle A. Williams	2016	2023
interim	Jane J. Kim	2023	2023
10	Andrea Baccarelli	2024	incumbent

=== Notable past and present faculty ===
- Joseph G. Allen, public health expert, director of the Healthy Buildings program
- Andrea Baccarelli, epigeneticist, clinical endocrinologist, and dean of school of public health
- Katherine Baicker, economist, a former member of the Council of Economic Advisers
- Robert Blendon, political strategy of health and public opinion expert
- Barry Bloom, immunologist and former dean
- David Bloom, economist
- Joseph Brain, physiologist and environmental health researcher
- David Canning, economist
- Richard A. Cash, American global health researcher, developed oral rehydration therapy (ORT)
- Marcia Caldas de Castro, demographer
- Lauren M. Childs, mathematician, Ruth I. Michler Memorial Prize recipient
- Douglas Dockery, epidemiologist
- Francesca Dominici, senior associate dean for research, professor of biostatistics, data scientist, and air pollution expert
- Arnold Epstein, department chair for health policy and management
- Max Essex, HIV researcher
- Sarah Fortune, immunologist
- Julio Frenk, former dean of school of public health and former Secretary of Health of Mexico
- Atul Gawande, general and endocrine surgeon
- Christopher D. Golden, ecologist
- Sue Goldie, physician and decision scientist, MacArthur fellowship recipient
- John Graham, policy and decision scientist, former director of the Office of Information and Regulatory Affairs
- Laurie Glimcher, immunologist
- Alice Hamilton, occupational health and toxicology; first woman appointed to the faculty of Harvard University
- David Hemenway, economist and injury prevention expert
- Albert Hofman, epidemiologist
- William Hsiao, economist
- Frank Hu, epidemiologist and nutrition researcher
- David Hunter, epidemiologist, Acting Dean of the Faculty and former Dean for Academic Affairs at School of Public Health
- Curtis Huttenhower, computational biologist
- Ashish Jha (MPH'04 and former faculty) served as Dean for Global Strategy 2018–2020
- Ichiro Kawachi, social epidemiologist
- Howard Koh, public health researcher, the 14th Assistant Secretary for Health at the U.S. Department of Health and Human Services.
- Margaret Elizabeth Kruk, public health expert, physician, and health systems researcher
- Nan Laird, biostatistician, former head of department
- Alexander H. Leighton, psychiatric epidemiologist
- Richard Levins, ecologist and mathematical biologist
- Xihong Lin, biostatistician and mathematician, 2006 COPSS Presidents' Award recipient
- Jun S. Liu, biostatistician and mathematician, 2002 COPSS Presidents' Award recipient
- Bernard Lown, co-founded the Nobel Peace Prize-winning group Physicians for Social Responsibility; founder of the Lown Cardiovascular Research Foundation
- Adetokunbo Lucas, former director of Tropical Diseases Research at the World Health Organization (WHO)
- Brian MacMahon, cancer epidemiologist
- Sezan Mahmud, Writer and university professor
- Christopher Murray, physician and health economist
- Kari Nadeau, immunologist
- Joseph Newhouse, economist and director of the RAND Health Insurance Experiment
- Shuji Ogino, pioneer in molecular pathological epidemiology
- John Quackenbush, computational biologist and genome scientist
- Eric Rubin, editor-in-chief of The New England Journal of Medicine
- James Robins, epidemiologist and biostatistician
- Pardis Sabeti, computational biologist, medical geneticist and evolutionary geneticist
- Benjamin P. Sachs, Harold H. Rosenfield Professor at Harvard Medical School
- Amartya Sen, economist, Nobel laureate in Economics
- Gita Sen, feminist scholar and specialist in international population policy
- Frank E. Speizer, physician and epidemiologist
- Andrew Spielman, public health entomologist
- Frederick J. Stare, controversial chair of Nutrition Institute
- James H. Ware, biostatistician
- Thomas Huckle Weller, Nobel laureate in Physiology and Medicine
- George C. Whipple, cofounder of School in 1922
- Dan Wikler, public health and medical ethicist, philosopher
- Walter Willett, physician and nutrition researcher
- David R. Williams, sociologist and epidemiologist
- Michelle Ann Williams, epidemiologist and former dean of school of public health

=== Notable alumni ===
There are over 13,484 alumni.

- Anthony Irvine Adams, 2001 Alumni Award of Merit for a distinguished service in public health practice
- James B. Aguayo-Martel, pioneer in ophthalmology
- Gro Harlem Brundtland, former Prime Minister of Norway, former Director-General of the World Health Organization
- Eli Capilouto, 12th president of the University of Kentucky
- Mandy Cohen, physician, current Director of the Centers for Disease Control and Prevention
- Raquel Eidelman Cohen, child psychiatrist and international authority on psychological and social consequences of disasters
- Humayun Chaudhry, President and CEO of the Federation of State Medical Boards
- Mary Cushman, Professor of Medicine and Pathology in the Robert Larner College of Medicine at the University of Vermont.
- Winston Dang, head of Taiwan's Environmental Protection Administration (2004–08)
- Jonathan Fielding, Director Los Angeles County Department of Public Health, editor in chief of the Annual Review of Public Health
- William Foege, physician, former Director of the Centers for Disease Control and Prevention
- Janina R. Galler, PI and Director of 45+-year Barbados Nutrition Study in the Lesser Antilles, in the Americas, showing the intergenerational legacy of poverty and disadvantage from childhood malnutrition.
- Steven K. Galson, former Acting Surgeon General of the United States
- Atul Gawande, surgical safety pioneer, MacArthur Fellow, Rhodes Scholar
- Sue Goldie, MacArthur Fellow and decision scientist
- Nadine Burke Harris, pediatrician and first Surgeon General of California
- Tara O. Henderson, Arthur and Marian Edelstein Professor of Pediatrics, Pritzker School of Medicine
- Stephen W. Hwang, physician, medical academic, and population health epidemiologist
- Timothy Johnson, chief medical correspondent for ABC News
- Karl Lauterbach, German politician (SPD), served as Federal Minister of Health since 8 December 2021
- Alberto P. León, former Secretary of Health, Mexico
- Jonathan Mann, former head of the World Health Organization global HIV/AIDS program
- John S. Marr, epidemiologist and author.
- Hilary D. Marston, former Chief Medical Officer of the US Food and Drug Administration
- James O. Mason, former Acting Surgeon General of the United States, former Director of the Centers for Disease Control and Prevention
- Shuji Ogino, pioneer in molecular pathological epidemiology
- Endang Rahayu Sedyaningsih, former Minister of Health of Indonesia
- David J. Sencer, longest-serving Director of the Centers for Disease Control and Prevention
- Carl G. Streed, physician, researcher, and advocate for the LGBTQ+ community
- Lai Ching-te, physician, incumbent President of the Republic of China, former Vice President of the Republic of China
- Rochelle Walensky, former Director of the Centers for Disease Control and Prevention
- Ananda S. Bandyopadhyay, Deputy Director - Polio at the Gates Foundation.
