= Standard Chartered Bank Building =

Building in Central, Hong Kong

Coordinates: 22°16′48.26″N 114°9′32.55″E

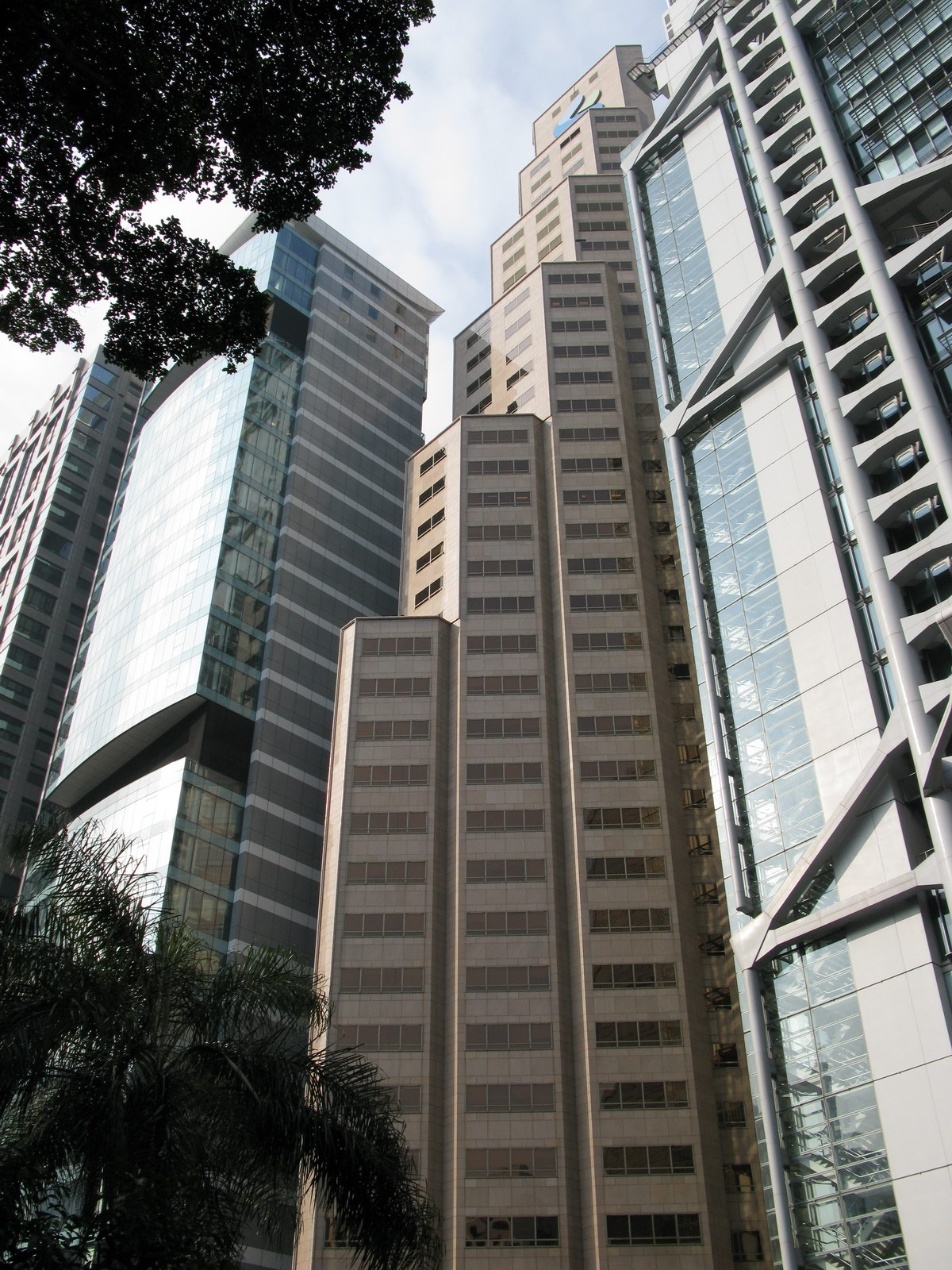
- View of Standard Chartered Bank Building from Queen's Road Central
- Interactive map of the Standard Chartered Bank Building area

General information
- Location: 4-4A Des Voeux Road Central; Central, Hong Kong
- Topped-out: 21 March 1989; 37 years ago
- Inaugurated: 30 May 1990; 36 years ago
- Cost: HK$600 million
- Owner: Hang Lung Properties

Height
- Roof: 191 m (627 ft)

Technical details
- Floor count: 42
- Floor area: 4,814 m^{2} (51,820 sq ft) (retail); 23,730 m^{2} (255,400 sq ft) (office); 28,544 m^{2} (307,250 sq ft) (total Gross Floor Area); 16 carpark spaces

Design and construction
- Architecture firm: Palmer and Turner
- Developer: Standard Chartered Bank
- Main contractor: Gammon-Nishimatsu JV

The Standard Chartered Bank Building (Chinese: 渣打銀行大廈) is a skyscraper located in Central, Hong Kong. The tower rises 42 storeys and 191 metres (627 ft) in height. The building was completed in 1990. It was designed by architectural firm P & T Architects & Engineers Ltd.

== History ==
=== Previous buildings ===
The site was previously home to the bank's former, 16-storey headquarters, built in 1959 and designed by Palmer and Turner.

=== Current building ===
In 1987, during the time of the negotiations of the Hong Kong sovereignty, the land "owner", The Standard Chartered Bank owned the life-time (999 years, until 2854) lease agreement with the Hong Kong Government. Around this time, the bank signed an agreement with Hang Lung Group, which now owns the land and the building and were responsible for the development cost and entire construction management. As part of the agreement, Hang Lung Group are required to lease back part of the floor area to Standard Chartered Bank for a long period at a low fee.

The new headquarters was designed, like its predecessor, by Palmer and Turner. It was constructed by a Gammon-Nishimatsu joint venture, and a superstructure topping-out ceremony was held on 21 March 1989.

The new headquarters was officially opened in a ceremony on 30 May 1990 officiated over by bank chairman Rodney Galpin and Governor David Wilson. It cost approximately HK$600 million to construct.

The building was financed through a unique arrangement, whereby Nishimatsu leased a portion of the building for a period of 25 years (until 2012), and then Standard Chartered leased most of this space back from Nishimatsu at pre-determined rates. Other areas of the building were let out directly by Nishimatsu. In December 1992, the building was sold to Amoy Properties, now called Hang Lung Properties, for HK$900 million, with Amoy assuming responsibility for leasing space from Nishimatsu on behalf of the bank.

== Design ==
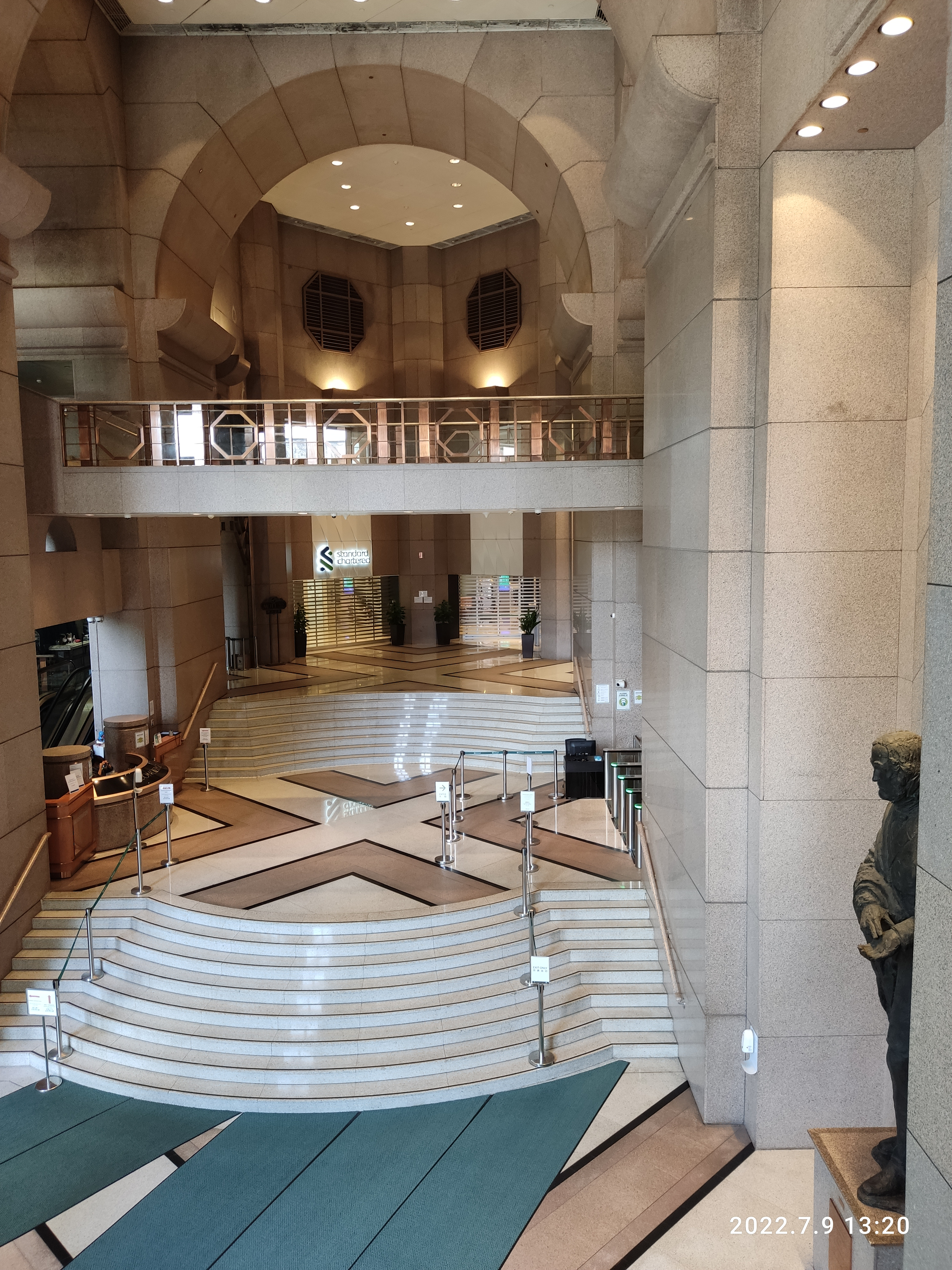
Building lobby

The building is 191 metres tall. Architect Remo Riva of Palmer and Turner led the building's design. The building is shaped so that the occupants can enjoy views of both Statue Square and Government Hill.

The lobby, on the side of the building that faces a small, dark alley, contains two huge stained glass windows, each 10 metres tall and 2.5 metres wide. They were designed by Riva and depict scenes of old and new Hong Kong. The windows were manufactured in London and shipped to Hong Kong. A third stained glass window faces the HSBC Main Building and was designed by Patrick Leung, an interior designer at Palmer and Turner.

== Current occupants ==
Currently, the building is home to the Hang Lung Group headquarters and the headquarters of the Standard Chartered Bank (Hong Kong), although the latter's main operation office is now located in Millennium City 1, Kwun Tong.

== See also ==
- List of tallest buildings in Hong Kong
