= Shuji Ogino =

Japanese epidemiologist

Shuji Ogino (荻野周史, Ogino Shuji; born 24 April 1968) is a molecular pathological epidemiologist, pathologist, and epidemiologist. He is Professor of Pathology at Harvard Medical School and Brigham and Women's Hospital, and Professor in the Department of Epidemiology at Harvard T.H. Chan School of Public Health.

He is also Chief of Program in MPE (Molecular Pathological Epidemiology) at Brigham and Women's Hospital, and an associate member of Broad Institute of MIT and Harvard.

He has been known for his work on establishing a new discipline, molecular pathological epidemiology (MPE) – an interdisciplinary science of molecular pathology and epidemiology.

== Education, training, and positions ==
Shuji Ogino graduated from the University of Tokyo School of Medicine, and from the University of Tokyo Graduate School of Medicine. From 1994 to 1995 he underwent internship in Japan at U.S. Naval Hospital Okinawa.

After coming to the United States, from 1995 to 1997 Ogino underwent residency training in anatomic pathology and clinical pathology at Allegheny General Hospital (Drexel University), and from 1997 to 1999 at Case Western Reserve University/University Hospitals Case Medical Center.

From 1997 to 1999 he underwent fellowship training in molecular pathology at the University of Pennsylvania Medical Center. After a postdoctoral fellowship at the University of Pennsylvania, in 2001 he joined Dana–Farber Cancer Institute, Brigham and Women's Hospital, and Harvard Medical School as Instructor in Pathology. He was promoted to Assistant Professor in 2004, to Associate Professor in 2008, and to Professor of the institutes in 2015.

In 2010 he received a Master of Science in Epidemiology degree from Harvard T.H. Chan School of Public Health, and subsequently obtained a secondary faculty appointment (Associate Professor) in 2012, promoted to Professor at that school in 2015.

Ogino became Chief of Program in MPE (Molecular Pathological Epidemiology) at Brigham and Women's Hospital in 2016, and an associate member of Broad Institute of MIT and Harvard in 2017.

== Career in MPE and colorectal cancer research ==
Ogino proposed that research into molecular pathology with epidemiologic settings should be regarded as a distinct field, and used the term "Molecular Pathological Epidemiology (MPE)" in 2010. Since his proposal, the MPE concept and paradigm have been in widespread use, and MPE has been a subject of international conferences such as American Association for Cancer Research (AACR), Society for Epidemiologic Research (SER), and the American Society of Preventive Oncology (ASPO).

The MPE approach aims to elucidate etiology of disease at molecular, individual, and population levels, applying molecular pathology to epidemiology. Utilizing tissue pathology resource and data within existing epidemiology studies, he has been publishing a large number of original articles proving the interrelationship between exposure to risk factors (e.g., environmental, dietary, lifestyle, and genetic factors) and molecular pathologic signature of disease (e.g., PIK3CA mutation in colorectal cancer), including some influential papers in the field, as well as papers which have developed the concepts of MPE.

Ogino's discoveries with the MPE approach include the interaction between aspirin use and PIK3CA mutation in colorectal cancer, and the interaction between endoscopy screening and post-colonoscopy colorectal cancer with CIMP and microsatellite instability MSI. He initiated the International Molecular Pathological Epidemiology (MPE) Meeting Series in 2013, and has been serving as the conference chairperson. Its second, third and fourth meetings were held in Boston, in December 2014, May 2016, and May 2018 respectively.

Ogino employed the MPE concept to propose a paradigm shift in colorectal cancer research. His proposal for a transition from the two-colon concept (the proximal and distal colon) to the colorectal continuum model was supported by an observed linear relationship between the location on the colon and Microsatellite instability (MSI), CpG island methylator phenotype (CIMP) and BRAF mutation frequency from the database analyses of over 1,400 colorectal cancer cases. This colorectal continuum model has been supported by others.

Ogino has introduced several new paradigms and research frameworks, including "the GWAS-MPE approach", "the unique tumor principal", "the unique disease principle", "the etiologic field effect model", "the integrative lifecourse epidemiology - MPE model", "the pharmaco-MPE model" and "the immunology-MPE model", all of which are related to the field of MPE.

== Honors and awards ==
- 2004: Executive Officer's Award, Association for Molecular Pathology (AMP)
- 2011: Ramzi Cotran Young Investigator Award, United States and Canadian Academy of Pathology
- 2012: Meritorious Service Award, Association for Molecular Pathology (AMP)
- 2014: The Most Influential Scientific Minds, 2014, by Thomson Reuters
- 2014: Elected Member, American Society for Clinical Investigation (ASCI)
- 2014: Member, FASEB Excellence in Science Award Committee
- 2015–present NCI R35 Outstanding Investigator Award recipient
- 2015, 2016, 2017, 2018, 2019, and 2020: Highly Cited Researchers by Thomson Reuters and Clarivate Analytics
- 2018: Outstanding Investigator Award, American Society for Investigative Pathology (ASIP)

== See also ==
- Historic recurrence
