= Stephen W. Hwang =

American-born Canadian physician and epidemiologist

- Born: Los Angeles, California, USA
- Spouse: Angela Cheung

Academic background
- Education: BSc, Biochemistry, 1984, Harvard University; MD, Johns Hopkins School of Medicine; MPH, Harvard T.H. Chan School of Public Health

Academic work
- Institutions: University of Toronto; St. Michael's Hospital

Stephen Wesley Hwang is an American-born Canadian internal-medicine physician and population health epidemiologist. He is a professor in the Department of Medicine and director of the Division of General Internal Medicine at the University of Toronto. Hwang is also the St. Michael's Hospital's inaugural chair in Homelessness, Housing, and Health and director of the MAP Centre for Urban Health Solutions.

== Early life and education ==
Hwang was born and raised in Los Angeles to parents who immigrated from China. As a senior at Rolling Hills High School, Hwang was among 43 California high school senior finalists in the 1980 Presidential Scholars Program. Having been raised in a privileged area, Hwang stated that he had never witnessed homelessness until he moved to Boston for his undergraduate degree at Harvard University. He graduated magna cum laude from Harvard in 1984 and subsequently enrolled at Johns Hopkins School of Medicine. While completing his medical degree, he met his future wife, Angela Cheung, and they decided to move to Toronto, Ontario for their residency to be closer to Cheung's parents. Following their residency, in which Hwang was named chief resident, they returned to Boston. While Cheung pursued her doctoral degree in health policy at Harvard, Hwang joined the non-profit organization Health Care for the Homeless to assist people living on the streets and in emergency shelters.

== Career ==
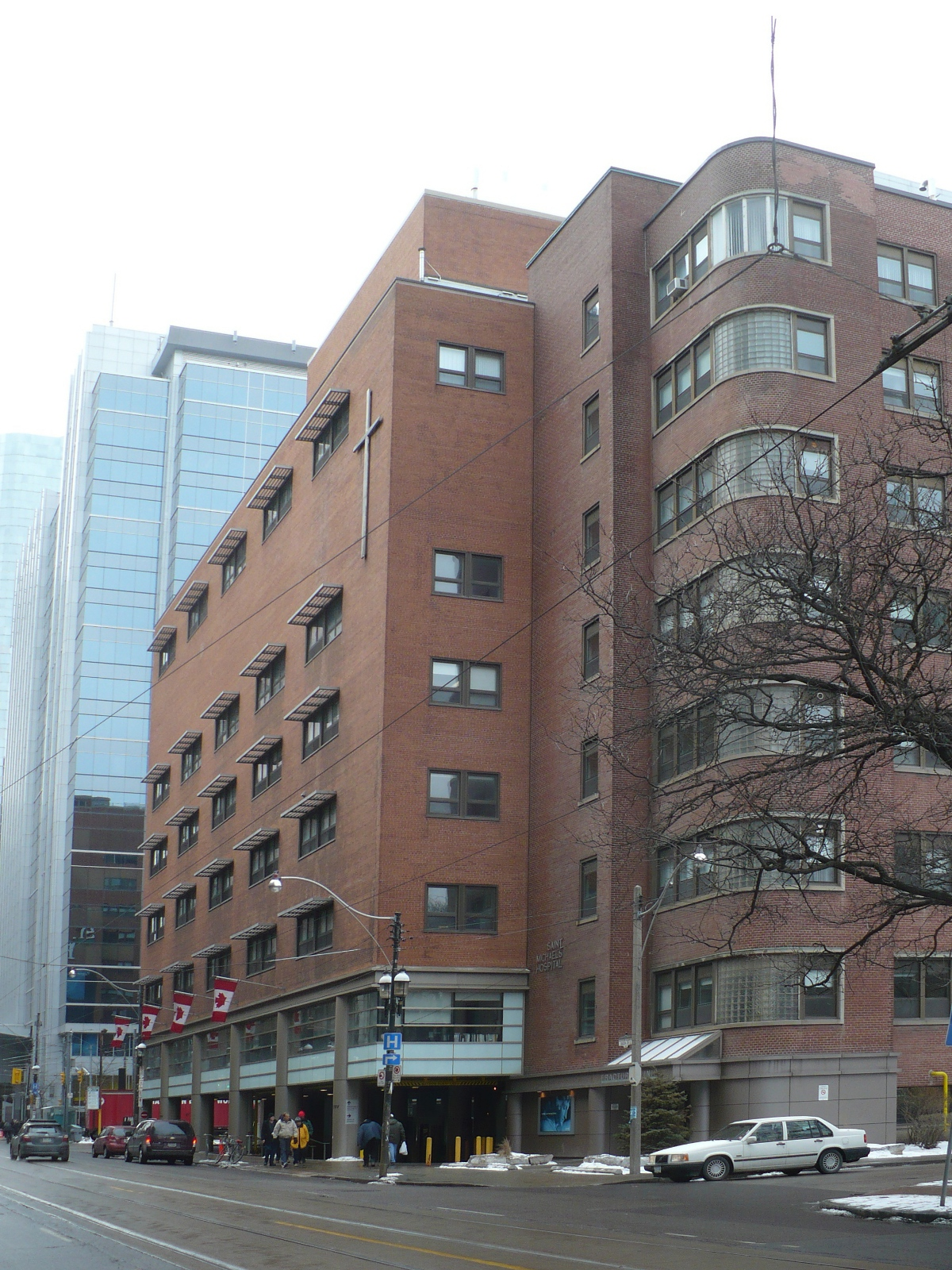
A photo of St. Michael's Hospital.

Upon completing his MPH at Harvard T.H. Chan School of Public Health, Hwang was recruited to Toronto by St. Michael's Hospital to lead their inner-city health program. In this role, he saw patients at the hospital as a doctor of internal medicine and spent a half-day a week at the Seaton House. One of his first research studies in this new role was investigating the death rates of Toronto homeless men. After gathering a dataset of 8,938 homeless men in Toronto over 2 1/2 years, Hwang concluded that they were eight times as likely to die as men in the general population. In 2002, Hwang received the New Investigator Award from the Canadian Society of Internal Medicine. He was shortly thereafter appointed departmental division director of General Internal Medicine (GIM) at the University of Toronto. Beyond his research, Hwang also advocated health equity and social justice through publicly available documents. In 2007, Hwang publicly admonished the Conservative Party of Canada for threatening to discontinue Vancouver's supervised injection site. He argued that they were putting "the health of the nation in peril" because they "ignore crucial research findings simply because they run contrary to a rigid policy agenda driven by ideology or fixed beliefs." This sentiment was repeated by Hwang and 84 other scientists in 2008 who argued that Prime Minister Stephen Harper "undermined, suppressed and distorted science for political reasons."

In 2011, Hwang's research team published the findings of their Health and Housing in Transitions Study (HHiTS) which followed homeless and marginally-housed people in Toronto, Vancouver, and Ottawa over a two-year period. The study found that regardless of housing status, participants had extremely poor overall health. In 2013, Hwang was appointed St. Michael's Hospital's inaugural Chair in Homelessness, Housing and Health, considered the first endowed research chair aimed at better understanding the health needs of those experiencing homelessness. One of the first studies he published in this new role found, for the first time, that Canadian physicians favoured patients based on economic status despite Canada's single-payer healthcare system. His research team found that callers to Toronto doctors' offices posing as bank employees were 80 per cent more likely to get an appointment than those presenting as welfare recipients. In 2015, Hwang was appointed director of the Centre for Research on Inner City Health at St. Michael’s Hospital.

As the director of GIM at the University of Toronto, Hwang helped the department become recognized as a sub-specialty of internal medicine with the establishment of a two-year training program. Hwang stepped down from this role in May 2016 and was replaced by ICES scientist, Moira Kapral. In 2018, Hwang received the Robert Sheppard Award for Health Equity and Social Justice for "outstanding contributions in the development and/or implementation of activities, programs or research related to social justice and health equity in faculty development or postgraduate medical education." The following year, Hwang oversaw the merging of the Centre for Urban Health Solutions into the MAP Centre for Urban Health Solutions at St. Michael's Hospital. He subsequently received a seven-year Canadian Institutes of Health Research Foundation Grant to continue his interventions research in homelessness, housing, and health. In February 2020, Hwang's work was recognized by the University of Toronto with their President’s Impact Award for "playing a pivotal role in advancing Canadian and international scholarship and advocacy related to homelessness."

During the COVID-19 pandemic, Hwang received funding through the COVID-19 Immunity Task Force to see how the pandemic impacted unhoused people in Toronto. His research project was entitled "The COVENANT Study: COVID-19 Cohort Study of People Experiencing Homelessness in Toronto." As the pandemic continued into 2022, Hwang encouraged vaccinations for those experiencing homelessness and those in shelters. Hwang was also named the recipient of a Harvard Chan School Alumni Award.
