= Raquel Eidelman Cohen =

Peruvian-American child psychiatrist

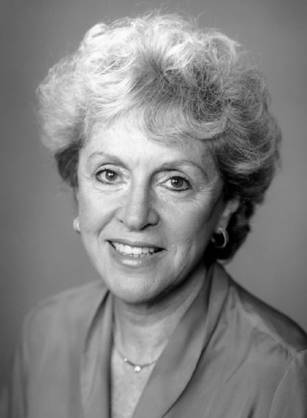
- Born: Raquel Eidelman; 1922; Lima, Peru
- Died: October 21, 2020 (aged 98); Miami, Florida, U.S.
- Education: National University of San Marcos; Harvard University
- Children: 3
- Scientific career
- Fields: Child and adolescent psychiatry, disaster management

Raquel Eidelman Cohen (1922 – October 21, 2020) was a Peruvian-American child psychiatrist specialized in disaster management. She was a student in the first class including women to graduate from Harvard Medical School, in 1949. She went on to become an international authority on psychological and social consequences of disasters such as Hurricane Mitch in Central America, October 1998, and intervention methods for humanitarian workers, used in assisting survivors of the Mariel boatlift of 1980 and victims of the September 11 attacks.

== Early life and education ==
Raquel Eidelman Cohen, a native of Lima, was born in 1922 to Russian-Jewish emigrants. Her parents emigrated to Lima in 1920 due to his father's avoid from being taken to the Russia's draft. Her father worked in the import and export business. She was raised in Lima's small Jewish community. She earned a M.S. in the sciences from the National University of San Marcos in 1942. After earning a master of public health degree at Harvard School of Public Health in 1945, she pursued an M.D. from Harvard Medical School. She was a student in its first class including women to graduate in 1949.

== Career ==
As a child psychiatrist, she was associate director of the laboratory of community psychiatry for Harvard's department of psychiatry, and psychiatric director at the North Suffolk Mental Health Center in Boston from 1963 to 1967. She was also superintendent of the Erich Lindemann Mental Health Center in Boston from 1977 to 1980. In 1976, she was given the American Psychiatric Association's Seymour D. Vestermark Award for excellence in teaching and in 1979 she earned the Massachusetts Public Health Association's Paul Revere Award. In 1992, she won the American Psychiatric Association's Simon Bolivar Award, in recognition of her dedicated efforts on behalf of Hispanic professionals.

From 1979 to 1982, she was a member of the national advisory council of the National Institutes of Mental Health, and in 1980, she was senior consultant for the Office of Refugee Resettlement of the Cuban Youth Camp Program during the Mariel boatlift, where she was responsible for developing programs for unaccompanied minors who traveled from Cuba to the United States.

From 1981 to 1987, she was associate director of Child and Adolescent Psychiatry at the Miller School of Medicine at the University of Miami. She was also director of education and training for the Miami World Health Organization collaborating Center for Mental Health, Alcohol, and Drug Dependence at the University of Miami's Spanish Family Guidance Center. From 1990 to 2000, she served as director of the Children's Center at the Florida Attorney General's office, where she was responsible for assessing and managing cases of child sexual abuse.

Her work as an authority in psychological and social consequences of disasters and intervention methods has been published in both English and Spanish editions of Mental Health Services in Disasters: Manual for Humanitarian Workers. Pan American Health Organization. 2000. ISBN 978-92-75-12273-0., which has been used to train disaster workers throughout Latin America and the Caribbean. She was a consultant to the Pan American Health Organization, the Boston Public Schools, and was a fellow of the American Psychiatric Association.

Following three decades of work in child psychiatry and child abuse cases, and training disaster relief workers, she consulted on the management of the mental health needs of disaster victims. Her later projects included developing a distance-learning program for use in training global disaster relief workers via the Internet and working with the department of public health at the University of Miami to develop a curriculum on terrorism for training health care personnel, clergy, and educators throughout Florida.

== Personal life ==
Cohen met her husband, a trial lawyer, on a blind date in 1946. They married the next year and had three children. She died on October 21, 2020, in her home in Miami.
