= Tara O. Henderson =

American pediatric oncologist

Academic background
- Education: MD, Pritzker School of Medicine; MPH, 2005, Harvard T.H. Chan School of Public Health

Academic work
- Institutions: University of Chicago; University of Chicago Medical Center

Tara Olive Henderson is an American pediatric oncologist. As the Arthur and Marian Edelstein Professor in the Department of Pediatrics, she is also the Director of the Childhood Cancer Survivor Center, Director of Survivorship at the University of Chicago Comprehensive Cancer Center, and chief of Pediatric Hematology and Oncology at the University of Chicago.

== Early life and education ==
Henderson became interested in the field of oncology after spending a summer in a New Jersey cancer research lab through a program called Partners in Science. Henderson completed her medical degree at the Pritzker School of Medicine and her Master of Public Health at the Harvard T.H. Chan School of Public Health. Following her medical degree, Henderson completed her fellowship at Boston Children's Hospital and her residency at Johns Hopkins School of Medicine. After finishing her master's degree at Harvard, Henderson received the 2005 Conquer Cancer Foundation Merit Award for her research on sarcomas as a subsequent malignancy in survivors of pediatric cancer, conducted as part of the Childhood Cancer Survivor Study.

== Career ==
Following her master's degree at Harvard, Henderson joined the Department of Pediatrics within the hematology-oncology section at the University of Chicago's (UChicago) Pritzker School of Medicine. By 2016, Henderson was serving as the Director of the Childhood Cancer Survivors Center where she specialized in care for childhood cancer survivors. Outside of UChicago, Henderson was appointed to serve on the 2017–18 Board of Directors for the American Society of Clinical Oncology (ASCO). She was also selected for 2018 Presidential Leadership Scholars program to help her develop practical leadership skills. Following this program, Henderson was designated ASCO's pediatric oncologist on its board of directors for a four-year term.

During the COVID-19 pandemic, Henderson publicly advocated to dispel vaccine hesitancy and encouraged other healthcare workers to receive the COVID-19 vaccine. In October 2021, Henderson re-appeared in Chicago magazine's Top Doctors and Top Doctors for Moms and Kids lists. Later, she was elected a Member of the American Society for Clinical Investigation for her efforts to addresses the late outcomes of childhood, adolescent and young adult cancer to inform both new treatment paradigms and long-term follow up care. In November 2021, Henderson was appointed the Service Line Chief of Pediatric Cancer and Blood Diseases at the Chicagoland Children's Health Alliance. She also became the Section Chief of Pediatric Hematology/Oncology and Stem Cell Transplantation at UChicago Medicine at the University of Chicago Medical Center. The following year, Henderson was named the Arthur and Marian Edelstein Professor in the Department of Pediatrics at UChicago.

== Personal life ==
Henderson is married and has three children.
