= Joseph G. Allen =

American academic and public health expert

- Citizenship: United States
- Education: Boston College (BS); Boston University School of Public Health (MPH, DSc)
- Known for: Healthy Buildings program at Harvard
- Scientific career
- Fields: Environmental health, public health research, air quality, healthy buildings
- Workplaces: Harvard School of Public Health

Joseph Gardner Allen is an American academic and public health expert who directs the Healthy Buildings program at the Harvard T. H. Chan School of Public Health, where he is also an associate professor. Much of Allen's work revolves around the emerging concept of healthy buildings and the impact of buildings and indoor air quality on human health.

== Early life and education ==
Allen graduated from Boston College with a degree in biology, and from Boston University School of Public Health with a Master of Public Health degree (environmental health) and a Doctor of Science degree (exposure assessment, environmental epidemiology, biostatistics).

== Career ==
=== Author ===
Allen co-authored the book Healthy Buildings: How Indoor Spaces Can Make You Sick - or Keep You Well (Harvard Press), with John Macomber from Harvard Business School. The New York Times named the book a “Top 8 Book for Healthy Living,” and Fortune named it a book of the year. He has also written for The New York Times, The Washington Post, The Boston Globe, The Atlantic, and Harvard Business Review.

=== Service ===
Allen is a member of the Scientific and Medical Editorial Review Panel of the American Lung Association, Associate Editor for the Journal of Exposure Science and Environmental Epidemiology, and Editor for the journal Indoor Environments.

=== COVID-19 ===
Allen served on The Lancet COVID-19 Commission and was Chair of The Lancet COVID-19 Commission Task Force on Safe Work, Safe School, and Safe Travel. He served on Harvard's Coronavirus Advisory and Governor Charlie Baker's (MA) Medical Advisory Board and was an advisor to The White House COVID-19 Response Team. During the COVID-19 pandemic, much of his public work concerned the role of building factors in public health, especially in the context of schools and the workforce returning to office spaces after an extended period of remote working during the pandemic. He publicized these considerations through over 60 op-eds in major publications, as well as with appearances on television news programs, and often used these platforms to correct misinformation surrounding transmission of the virus on surfaces and in the air. 60 Minutes featured his work in a segment titled, The Air We Breathe.

=== Climate Change ===
Allen studies the role that buildings play in climate change and strategies to off-set building-related emissions. He has published several articles on the climate and health co-benefits of energy-efficiency measures in buildings. He authored an article in Harvard Business Review titled, "Designing buildings that are both well-ventilated and green," that provides recommendations for how to achieve a healthy building that is also energy-efficient. Allen is a faculty member with the Norman Foster Institute's Programme on Sustainable Cities.

=== Healthy buildings ===
Allen created Harvard's 'The 9 Foundations of a Healthy Building', a report that synthesized the scientific research on factors that lead to better health indoors. He keynoted the first ever White House Summit on Indoor Air Quality. JPMC tapped him to advise on healthy building strategies for their new headquarters at 270 Park Avenue in NYC. Allen holds a patent for "Intelligent Building Monitoring" and H.E.A.A.L., which is a system and algorithm for analyzing real-time data from indoor air quality sensors that bins data and scores building health performance into: Health-Optimized, Excellent, Action, Alert, Limit.

== Forever Chemicals ==
Allen coined the term "Forever Chemicals" in an essay in The Washington Post in 2018, In an interview in 2023 he described his motivation: “I wanted to talk about them in a way that might be more accessible to a lot of people and include in their name their key feature—that they are forever,” Allen says. “The decisions we’re making in terms of these products and their use will last through our lifetime and well beyond.” Along with invoking one of their key features, the name “forever chemicals” is a play on their molecular bond: Allen switched around the commonly called carbon-fluoride bond to a “fluorine-carbon bond” in his op-ed, linking the F-C bond to the Forever-Chemical property.
