= Alberto P. León =

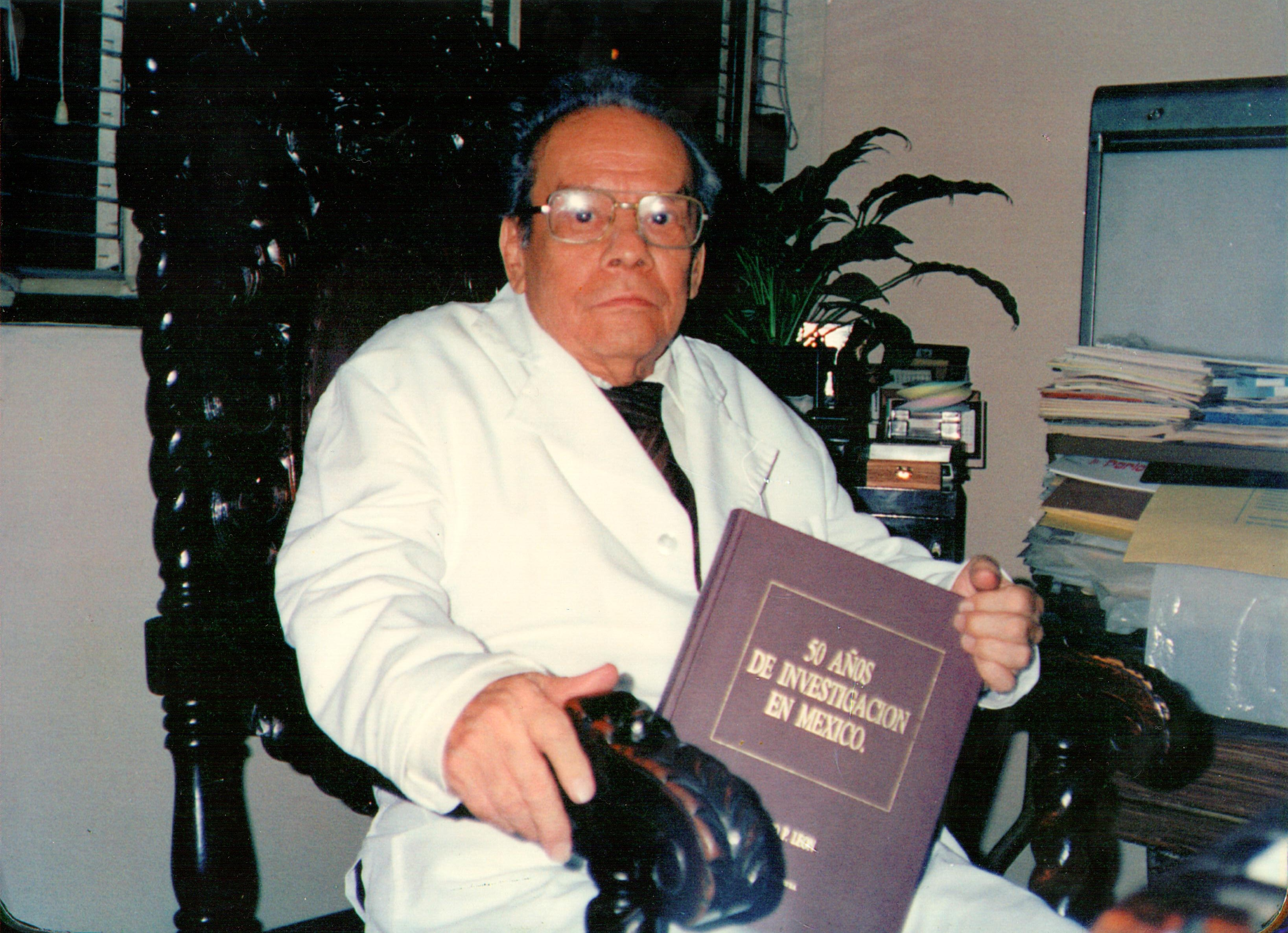
Alberto P. León holding his book 50 Years Of Investigation In Mexico

Alberto P. León (1909-2001) was the Secretary of Health of Mexico beginning in 1939. He is the 1991 holder of the Mexican National Prize on Medicine and Health.

== Biography ==
León was born in Irapuato, Mexico, on July 12, 1909, and died on August 4, 2001, in Mexico City.

He gained his BS degree at the Preparatory School of Aguascalientes in 1926, his MD at the National University of Mexico in 1933, and MPH degree at the Harvard School of Public Health in 1936. At Harvard he studied under Hans Zinsser. He was Professor of Bacteriology and Immunology at the School of Medicine, National University of México from 1946 to 1950 and since 1946 Professor of Clinics for Infections Diseases.

He worked for the Department of Public Health from 1930 to 1934, doing his residency with the medical emergency services of the City of Mexico from 1932 to 1933. He was a consulting physician of the Department of Public Welfare of Mexico in 1933 and chief of internal medicine of the Spanish Hospital of Mexico City from 1933 to 1934. For his studies at the Harvard School of Public Health from 1934 to 1936, León received a Fellowship from the Rockefeller Foundation. In 1936, he became technical supervisor of the Department of Public Health in Mexico. He founded and directed the Office of Epidemiology in the same department from 1937 to 1940. From 1938 to 1988 he worked as a professor at the Institute for Tropical Diseases in Mexico (Instituto de Enfermedades Tropicales).

In 1939, León was appointed General Secretary of Health in the Mexican Secretariat of Health.

He founded and directed the Institute of the BCG of Mexico from 1948 to 1965.

In addition to his previously mentioned academic posts, he was Professor of Immunology, School of Biological Sciences, National Polytechnic Institute of Mexico, 1945 to 1950; Professor of Epidemiology, Immunology and Bacteriology, School of Public Health, 1938 to 1950; Professor, School of Medicine, University of California at Los Angeles, 1950. Leon was a leading expert on public health issues in Mexico, especially the vaccination campaign against tuberculosis.

León was fellow of six national societies, President of three of them, and a member of seven international societies. From 1946 to 1949 he was President of the Mexican Society for Geography and Statistics (Sociedad Mexicana de Geografía y Estadística), the first scientific society founded 1833 in America.

In 1948 he was Chief of the Mexican Delegation of the World Health Assembly in Geneva, during which his initiative and efforts helped to establish the Division of Environmental Sanitation and the Panel on Brucellosis.

He received the first award of Physiology of the Mexican Society of Internal Medicine and the Gold Medal and Diploma for Public Health Merit of the Department of Public Health and Public Assistance. Silver Medal, Gold Medal and Diplomas for 25, 30 and 35 years of Professorship of the School of Medicine National University of Mexico, have been awarded to him and other honours include: Gold Medal and Diploma for Health Merit, Mexican Public Health Association; Diplom for the Foundation and Distinguished Services, National Committee Against Tuberculosis, Mexico.

Honorary membership Inter American Statistical Institute. For 40 years León was member and vice president of the American Public Health Association.

He published 1992 his book 50 Years Of Investigation In Mexico Marquéz López Editorial Inc.

In 1979 Leon started to conduct a research on cancer treatment. Unfortunately because of his old age he could not publish a scientific publication of the successful therapies cases applied. Nevertheless, he was able to cure some cases of cancer sick patients in his practice, and most of those where hopeless cases.

== Private life ==
He married María del Refugio Lomelí Sánchez in 1934 in Mexico City. They raised 9 children.
