= 5Y Capital =

China-based venture capital firm

5Y Capital Management Limited
- Native name: 五源资本
- Formerly: Morningside Venture Capital (晨兴资本)
- Type: Private
- Industry: Venture Capital
- Founded: 2008
- Founders: Shi Jianming (Ken); Liu Qin (Richard)
- Headquarters: Wuyuan Road, Shanghai, China
- Products: Investments
- AUM: $5 billion (31 March 2021)
- Website: www.5ycap.com

5Y Capital (Chinese: 五源资本; pinyin: Wǔyuán zīběn) is a Shanghai-based venture capital firm founded in 2008. It was previously known as Morningside Venture Capital before it rebranded in October 2020.

== Background ==
5Y Capital was founded in 2008 by Ken Shi and Richard Liu under the name, Morningside Venture Capital.

Prior to founding the firm, Liu and Shi worked as investment professionals at the Morningside Group, a family office founded in 1986 by Gerald Chan and his family. The Chan family currently runs the Hang Lung Group in Hong Kong.

Morningside Group was an investor in the firm and permitted it to use the Morningside name.

In October 2020, the firm rebranded to 5Y Capital. The name comes from 'Wuyuan Road,' which is the Shanghai street where the firm has been headquartered since its founding.

In 2021, Bloomberg reported that the firm was seeking to raise a new fund, and that it had delivered a $30 billion return on its investment in Kuaishou. It closed a number of funds after reaching hard caps that year.

In November 2023, it was reported that 5Y Capital was on track to surpass its target of raising $700 million for its new fund. This came when fundraising during the year had significantly declined due to various factors such as the China–United States trade war that limited US investments in Chinese firms.

== Investment model ==
5Y Capital focuses on early-stage venture investments in different sectors.

Its portfolio companies have included Xiaomi, Kuaishou, SenseTime, Pony.ai and XPeng.
