= Marcia Caldas de Castro =

Professor at Harvard

Marcia Castro Marcia Caldas de Castro
- Education: Rio de Janeiro State University
- Scientific career
- Fields: Demography
- Workplaces: Harvard University

Marcia Caldas de Castro (born 1964) is a Professor of Demography and Chair of the Department of Global Health and Population at Harvard University. She is well known for studying Malaria and other vector borne diseases, as well as the intersection between urbanization and public health. She is the first Brazilian woman to become a faculty member at Harvard.

== Education and career ==
Castro graduated from Rio de Janeiro State University in 1986 with a degree in Statistics. She then went to work at the Brazilian National Social Security Institute's processing center in Rio de Janeiro. While working there, she earned her Masters in Demography from Universidade Federal de Minas Gerais. In this program, she fell under the mentorship of malaria researchers Burton Singer and Diana Sawyer. In 1998, under Singer's advice, she moved to the United States and pursued a PhD in Demography at Princeton University with Singer as her advisor. Castro worked as an Assistant Professor of Geography for two years at the University of South Carolina before moving to the Harvard School of Public Health in 2006. She is the first and only Brazilian Woman to hold a professorship at Harvard. She is currently the Andelot Professor of Demography at Harvard and the Chair of the Department of Global Health and Population. She is co-chair of the Brazil Studies Program Faculty Committee and serves on the executive committee of David Rockefeller Center for Latin American Studies at Harvard University. In 2010, she was a founding member of the Wittgenstein Centre for Demography and Global Human Capital.

== Research contributions ==
The primary focus of Castro's work has been the study of tropical diseases, especially Malaria.Castro has always taken a multidisciplinary approach to her work, taking the lessons of statistics and spatial analysis and applying them to the humanities and public health. She has done extensive fieldwork in Brazil, Tanzania, and Ghana. Her work in Dar es Salaam, Tanzania, was successful in using larvicide to reduce malaria infections by 21%.

Castro has also garnered recent media attention for her criticisms of Brazil's response to the COVID-19 pandemic. She claims the disease plays a large role in exacerbating existing inequalities in Brazil. This is not the first time Castro has been critical of the Brazilian Government's handling of disease prevention. She called the 2016 decision to merge the agency that combats malaria with the one that combats zika and yellow fever a betrayal of the research done in her field. She has also warned of the negative consequences of deforestation on public health.

She served as a reviewer for the academic journal Demography.

== Honors & awards ==
- 2018: Roger L. Nichols Award for Excellence in Teaching.
