= Carl G. Streed =

American physician

- Born: Zion, Illinois, U.S.
- Education: University of Chicago (BS, BA); Johns Hopkins School of Medicine (MD); Harvard T.H. Chan School of Public Health (MPH)
- Occupations: Physician, researcher, LGBTQ+ health advocate
- Medical career
- Field: LGBT health, health equity
- Institutions: Boston University School of Medicine
- Awards: AMA Foundation Leadership Award (2014)

Carl G. Streed Jr. is an American physician, researcher, and advocate for the LGBTQ+ community. He is an assistant professor of medicine at Boston University School of Medicine.

== Early life and education ==
Streed grew up in Zion, Illinois. He completed a B.S. in biological chemistry and B.A. in chemistry at University of Chicago in 2007. While at Chicago, Streed became an advocate for LGBTQ issues and served on the university's committee for enhancing support for the LGBTQ community. He came out as gay to his family before graduating. Streed volunteered at the Broadway Youth Center with their HIV and STI services. He worked as a clinical research coordinator and manager at the Howard Brown Health Center and served as a member of the Chicago Department of Public Health HIV Prevision Planning Group. Streed volunteered for Equality Illinois to bring marriage equality to his state. In 2013, he earned an M.D. at Johns Hopkins School of Medicine. Streed completed an LGBT Health Policy & Practice certificate at George Washington University in 2015. For his certificate capstone, Streed reviewed the implicit bias and attitudes of health professional students in relation to health care outcomes of LGBT patients. In 2016, he completed an internal medicine residency at Johns Hopkins Bayview Medical Center. He earned an M.P.H. in clinical effectiveness from Harvard T.H. Chan School of Public Health in 2018. He completed a general internal medicine fellowship at Brigham and Women's Hospital in 2018.

== Career ==
Streed is a physician, researcher, and advocate for the LGBTQ+ community. He is an assistant professor of medicine at Boston University School of Medicine.

== Awards ==
In 2014, Streed received the AMA Foundation Leadership Award. He is a Fellow of the American College of Physicians.
