= Sue Goldie =

American academic

Sue J. Goldie
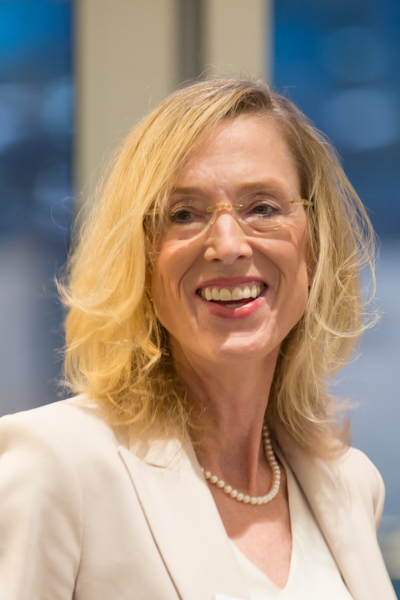
- Born: December 1961 (age 64)
- Citizenship: American
- Education: Union College; Albany Medical College; Yale University School of Medicine; Harvard School of Public Health
- Awards: MacArthur Fellows Program
- Scientific career
- Fields: Public Health; Decision Science; Global Health
- Workplaces: Harvard T.H. Chan School of Public Health; Harvard Medical School; Harvard University

Sue J. Goldie (born 1961) is an American physician and scientist who is recognized for her contributions to public health and decision science.

Goldie is the Roger Irving Lee Professor of Public Health in the Department of Health and Policy Management and the director of the Center for Health Decision Science at Harvard T.H. Chan School of Public Health and Professor of Global Health and Social Medicine at Harvard Medical School. She is also the director of the Global Health Education and Learning Incubator and the founding faculty director of the Harvard Global Health Institute at Harvard University.

== Research and Scientific Contributions ==
Goldie’s work has advanced public health decision science through innovative methodological contributions and the application of sophisticated mathematical modeling techniques. Her research has focused on developing and refining decision analysis tools that simulate the natural history of infectious diseases and evaluate the clinical and economic impacts of various interventions. These models have supported evidence-based policymaking in areas such as cervical cancer prevention and maternal health, informing both clinical guidelines and public health strategies in settings ranging from high-income to resource-limited environments. In recognition of her innovative contributions, Goldie received a MacArthur Fellowship in 2005 for applying rigorous analyses and interventions to transform women’s healthcare around the world and to reduce female morbidity and mortality in underserved populations.

Her work on the effectiveness and cost-effectiveness of screening and treatment strategies has contributed to the shaping of clinical practice guidelines and her influential assessments of screening innovations have been highlighted in major media outlets.

== Leadership Roles in Public Health ==
After joining the Harvard T.H. Chan School of Public Health in 1998 and receiving tenure in 2006, she was named the Roger Irving Lee Professor of Public Health in 2007 and later assumed a secondary appointment as Professor of Global Health and Social Medicine at Harvard Medical School. In 2008, she was appointed as the inaugural director of the university-wide Center for Health Decision Science (CHDS), which advances the theory and application of decision science to improve health technology assessment and public health practice in the U.S. and globally.

From 2007 to 2009, Goldie co-chaired the Harvard Initiative for Global Health, helping to set the agenda for interdisciplinary collaboration on global health challenges. In 2010, she was appointed as the founding director of the Harvard Global Health Institute by Harvard University President Drew Gilpin Faust, and in 2014, she was named Special Advisor to the Provost on Global Health Education and Learning and appointed as the director of the Global Health Education and Learning Incubator (GHELI) at Harvard University.

Beyond Harvard, Goldie has served on the Board on Global Health for the Institute of Medicine, participated on several technical advisory boards for the World Health Organization, and served as a Commissioner on The Lancet Commission on Investing in Health,

== Education ==
Goldie attended Union College (1984), Albany Medical College (1988), completed her internship and residency at Yale New Haven Hospital, Yale University School of Medicine (1988-1991), and earned her MPH from the Harvard School of Public Health (1997) where she was also a recipient of a fellowship award from the Agency for Health Care Research and Quality (1995-1997).

== Personal life ==
Goldie was diagnosed with Parkinson’s disease in 2021. A 2025 New York Times profile by Pulitzer Prize–winning journalist John Branch chronicled her experience over two and a half years through extensive interviews and access to her personal video journals. Branch and Goldie discussed the reporting process in an interview on NPR’s All Things Considered on October 18, 2025.

Since diagnosis, Goldie has completed multiple long-distance triathlons, including the Ironman Lake Placid (2022), Ironman 70.3 Musselman (2025), Ironman 70.3 Augusta (2023, 2025), Ironman 70.3 Maine (2023, 2024, 2025), and the Patriot Half Triathlon (70.3 distance) (2021, 2022, 2024, 2025) held in Freetown, Massachusetts.

== Awards ==
- 2005 — MacArthur Fellows Program
- 2009 — elected to the Institute of Medicine, National Academy of Sciences
