= Andrea Baccarelli =

Italian-American epigeneticist and clinical endocrinologist

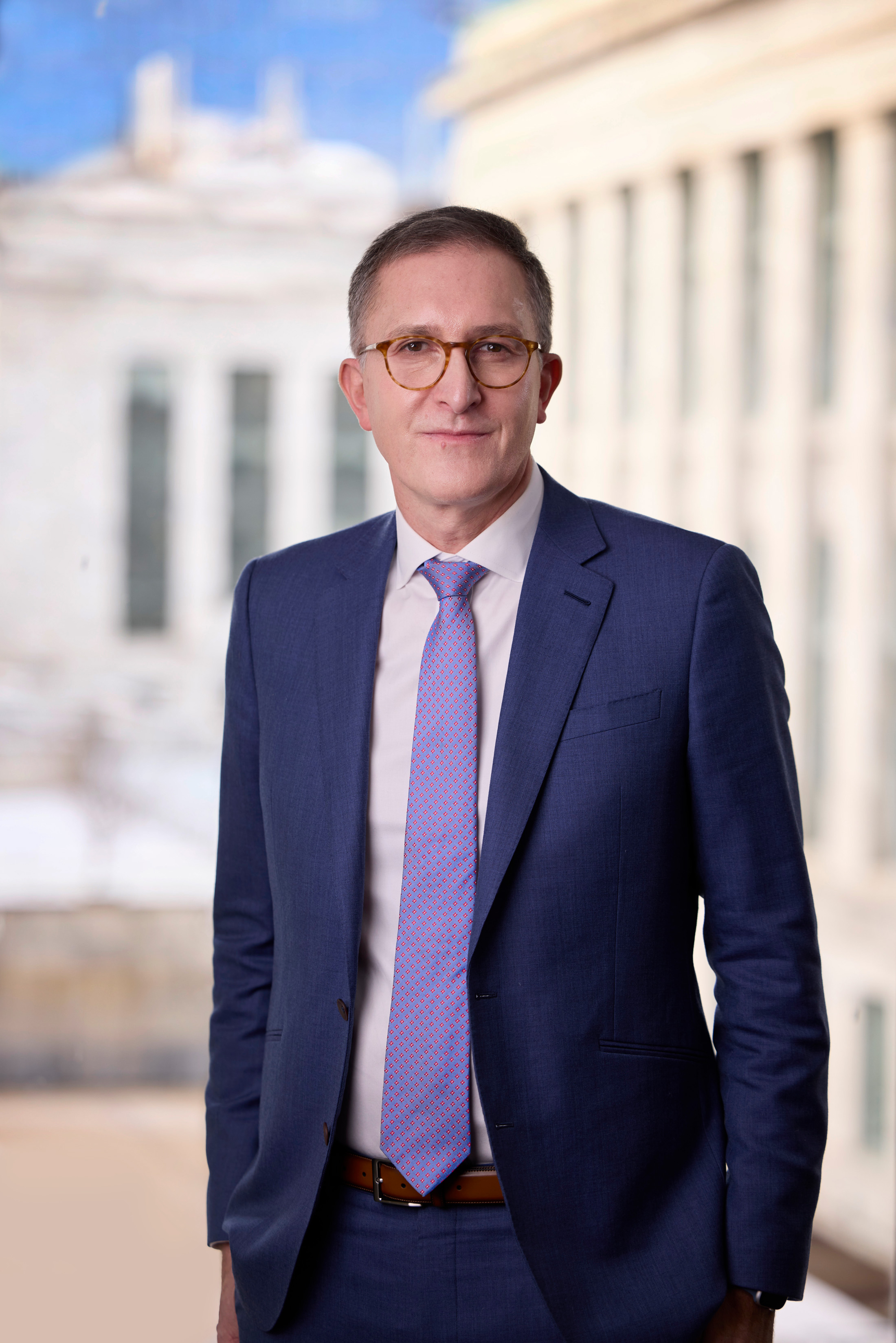

10th Dean of the Harvard T.H. Chan School of Public Health
- Incumbent
- Assumed office January 1, 2024
- Preceded by: Jane Kim (interim)

Personal details
- Born: Italy
- Citizenship: American, Italian (dual citizenship)
- Education: University of Perugia (Med); University of Turin (MS); University of Milan (PhD)
- Scientific career
- Fields: Environmental health sciences, epigenetics, mitochondriomics, and computational epigenomics
- Workplaces: National Cancer Institute’s Division of Cancer Epidemiology and Genetics; Universita' degli Studi di Milano; Harvard T.H. Chan School of Public Health; Columbia University Mailman School of Public Health

Andrea Baccarelli is an Italian-American epigeneticist and clinical endocrinologist, best known for his academic contributions in the field of epigenetics, mitochondriomics, and computational epigenomics, with a research focus on investigating the impact of environmental exposures on human health. He serves as the 10th dean of the Harvard T.H. Chan School of Public Health.

Baccarelli is also well known for his work drawing a link between Tylenol and autism, with the Trump Administration citing his work when advising pregnant women not to take the drug.

== Education and career ==
Baccarelli graduated cum laude with a medical degree from the University of Perugia, Italy in 1995, obtained his Master of Science in epidemiology from the University of Turin, Italy, and his Ph.D. in occupational health and industrial hygiene from the University of Milan, Italy, in 2003.

He completed his residency in endocrinology at the University of Milan and his postdoctoral fellowship at the National Cancer Institute's Division of Cancer Epidemiology and Genetics (2000–2004).

He also served as Professor and Chair of the Department of Environmental Health Sciences at the Columbia University Mailman School of Public Health from 2016 to 2023. While at Columbia, he led the NIEHS Center for Environmental Health, which brought together scientists, advocates, community organizations and the public to understand health concerns caused by environmental exposures.

Baccarelli has served as the Dean of the Faculty at the Harvard T.H. Chan School of Public Health since January 2024. He previously taught at the Harvard Chan School as the Mark and Catherine Winkler Associate Professor of Environmental Epigenetics from 2010 to 2016.

== Research ==
Baccarelli's research has pioneered the field of public health epigenetics, which explores how environmental factors can modify gene expression without changing the DNA sequence. His studies have demonstrated that air pollution can alter the epigenome, leading to changes in gene regulation that may contribute to the development of diseases such as cardiovascular disorders and neurodegenerative conditions.

Baccarelli conducted research showing that short-term exposure to air pollution, including levels considered "acceptable," can impair cognitive ability in the elderly. Baccarelli also found that the use of nonsteroidal anti-inflammatory drugs such as aspirin partially protected against the negative cognitive effects of pollution. He also conducted research showing that ambient air pollution is associated with an increased risk of osteoporosis and bone fractures in older individuals.

In April 2024, Baccarelli authored an opinion article in The Boston Globe, highlighting the scientific advancements related to the exposome, which represents the sum of all environmental and behavioral exposures affecting human health. The article emphasized the potential of DNA methylation and epigenetic analysis to improve public health by identifying and preventing harmful environmental exposures through advanced diagnostic methods.

In 2025, Baccarelli coauthored a systematic review and synthesis that concluded that prenatal acetaminophen (Tylenol) exposure was related to increased risk of neurodevelomental disorders such as autism and ADHD. The review became controversial after the US administration cited it on 22 September 2025 to warn pregnant women against Tylenol. Critics pointed to Baccarelli's earlier paid role as a plaintiffs' expert witness in Tylenol litigation, where a federal judge excluded his testimony as unreliable, and to methodological choices in the review. Larger and higher quality syntheses published since, including a BMJ umbrella review and The Lancet sibling-study meta-analysis, found no clear link once familial confounding is controlled.

This is not Baccarelli's first work related to acetaminophen. The study has garnered strong criticism by the scientific community because of its inconsistent methodology and multiple choices that swayed the interpretation of results. Nonetheless, the conclusions of the study by Baccarelli and his colleagues were consistent with a consensus statement published by experts worldwide that also linked prenatal use of acetaminophen with higher risk of child's neurovelopmental disorder.

== Expert testimony ==
In 2023 he was a proposed expert plaintiff witness in a lawsuit against acetaminophen manufacturers. A judge excluded him and other plaintiff witnesses because the experts' bases for their opinions did not meet required court scrutiny. In September 2025, Baccarelli stated that he was paid $150,000 for his work to prepare the comprehensive written report needed to serve as an expert witness in the court case. Dr. Bruce Lamphear, a renowned epidemiologist, reported how he routinely encourages scientists to testify in similar cases-as Baccarelli did-as a means to have science influence practice.

== Awards and recognition ==
In 2020, Baccarelli was elected to the National Academy of Medicine. He has also been an active member of the International Society of Environmental Epidemiology, serving as the society's president from 2022 to 2023.

Baccarelli was recognized as the “Person of the Year” by the City of Perugia, Italy.

In 2024, he was honored as the National Institute of Environmental Health Sciences Hans L. Falk Memorial Lecture Award recipient, recognizing his contributions to environmental health sciences.

In 2025, Baccarelli was honored with the John Goldsmith Award from the International Society for Environmental Epidemiology (ISEE), the society's highest accolade, recognizing his sustained and outstanding contributions to the knowledge and practice of environmental epidemiology. As part of the award, he was invited to present the John Goldsmith Memorial Lecture at the ISEE annual conference.

== Selected publications ==
- Baccarelli, Andrea; Bollati, Valentina (2009). "Epigenetics and environmental chemicals". Current Opinion in Pediatrics. 21 (2): 243–251. doi:10.1097/MOP.0b013e32832925cc. ISSN 1040-8703. PMC 3035853. PMID 19663042.
- Marioni, Riccardo E; Shah, Sonia; McRae, Allan F; Chen, Brian H; Colicino, Elena; Harris, Sarah E; Gibson, Jude; Henders, Anjali K; Redmond, Paul; Cox, Simon R; Pattie, Alison (2015). "DNA methylation age of blood predicts all-cause mortality in later life". Genome Biology. 16 (1): 25. Bibcode:2015GenBi..16...25M. doi:10.1186/s13059-015-0584-6. ISSN 1474-760X. PMC 4350614. PMID 25633388.
- Baccarelli, Andrea; Wright, Robert O.; Bollati, Valentina; Tarantini, Letizia; Litonjua, Augusto A.; Suh, Helen H.; Zanobetti, Antonella; Sparrow, David; Vokonas, Pantel S.; Schwartz, Joel (2009). "Rapid DNA Methylation Changes after Exposure to Traffic Particles". American Journal of Respiratory and Critical Care Medicine. 179 (7): 572–578. doi:10.1164/rccm.200807-1097OC. ISSN 1073-449X. PMC 2720123. PMID 19136372.
- Bollati, Valentina; Baccarelli, Andrea; Hou, Lifang; Bonzini, Matteo; Fustinoni, Silvia; Cavallo, Domenico; Byun, Hyang-Min; Jiang, Jiayi; Marinelli, Barbara; Pesatori, Angela C.; Bertazzi, Pier A. (February 1, 2007). "Changes in DNA Methylation Patterns in Subjects Exposed to Low-Dose Benzene". Cancer Research. 67 (3): 876–880. doi:10.1158/0008-5472.CAN-06-2995. hdl:11383/1708214. ISSN 0008-5472. PMID 17283117. S2CID 15163723.
- Levine, Morgan E.; Lu, Ake T.; Quach, Austin; Chen, Brian H.; Assimes, Themistocles L.; Bandinelli, Stefania; Hou, Lifang; Baccarelli, Andrea A.; Stewart, James D.; Li, Yun; Whitsel, Eric A. (April 18, 2018). "An epigenetic biomarker of aging for lifespan and healthspan". Aging. 10 (4): 573–591. doi:10.18632/aging.101414. ISSN 1945-4589. PMC 5940111. PMID 29676998.
- Kupsco, Allison; Kioumourtzoglou, Marianthi-Anna; Just, Allan C; Amarasiriwardena, Chitra; Estrada-Gutierrez, Guadalupe; Cantoral, Alejandra; Sanders, Alison P; Braun, Joseph M; Svensson, Katherine; Brennan, Kasey JM; Oken, Emily; Wright, Robert O; Baccarelli, Andrea A.; Téllez-Rojo, Maria M (March 2019). "Prenatal metal concentrations and childhood cardio-metabolic risk using Bayesian Kernel Machine Regression to assess mixture and interaction effects". Epidemiology. 30 (2): 263–273. doi:10.1097/EDE.0000000000000962. ISSN 1044-3983. PMC 6402346. PMID 30720588.
- Turner, Michelle C.; Andersen, Zorana J.; Baccarelli, Andrea; Diver, W. Ryan; Gapstur, Susan M.; Pope, C. Arden; Prada, Diddier; Samet, Jonathan; Thurston, George; Cohen, Aaron (November 2020). "Outdoor air pollution and cancer: An overview of the current evidence and public health recommendations". CA: A Cancer Journal for Clinicians. 70 (6): 460–479. doi:10.3322/caac.21632. ISSN 0007-9235. PMC 7904962. PMID 32964460.
- Bell, Christopher G.; Lowe, Robert; Adams, Peter D.; Baccarelli, Andrea A.; Beck, Stephan; Bell, Jordana T.; Christensen, Brock C.; Gladyshev, Vadim N.; Heijmans, Bastiaan T.; Horvath, Steve; Ideker, Trey; Issa, Jean-Pierre J.; Kelsey, Karl T.; Marioni, Riccardo E.; Reik, Wolf (November 25, 2019). "DNA methylation aging clocks: challenges and recommendations". Genome Biology. 20 (1): 249. Bibcode:2019GenBi..20..249B. doi:10.1186/s13059-019-1824-y. ISSN 1474-760X. PMC 6876109. PMID 31767039.
- Wu, Haotian; Eckhardt, Christina M.; Baccarelli, Andrea A. (May 2023). "Molecular mechanisms of environmental exposures and human diseases". Nature Reviews Genetics. 24 (5): 332–344. doi:10.1038/s41576-022-00569-3. ISSN 1471-0056. PMC 10562207. PMID 36717624.
- Piscitelli, Prisco; Miani, Alessandro; Setti, Leonardo; De Gennaro, Gianluigi; Rodo, Xavier; Artinano, Begona; Vara, Elena; Rancan, Lisa; Arias, Javier; Passarini, Fabrizio; Barbieri, Pierluigi; Pallavicini, Alberto; Parente, Alessandro; D'Oro, Edoardo Cavalieri; De Maio, Claudio (August 2022). "The role of outdoor and indoor air quality in the spread of SARS-CoV-2: Overview and recommendations by the research group on COVID-19 and particulate matter (RESCOP commission)". Environmental Research. 211 113038. Bibcode:2022ER....21113038P. doi:10.1016/j.envres.2022.113038. ISSN 0013-9351. PMC 8881809. PMID 35231456.
- Peters A, Nawrot TS, Baccarelli AA. Hallmarks of environmental insults. Cell. 2021;184(6):1455–1468.
