= Chan Tseng-hsi =

Chinese businessman

Chan Tseng-hsi T.H. Chan
- 陳曾熙
- Born: Chan Tseng-hsi; 1923; Guangdong, China
- Died: 8 March 1986 (aged 62–63)
- Occupation: Property developer
- Known for: Co-founder of the Hang Lung Group
- Children: Ronnie Chan; Gerald Chan

Chan Tseng-hsi (Chinese: 陳曾熙; pinyin: Chén Zēngxī; abbreviated as T.H. Chan; 1923 – 8 March 1986) was a Hong Kong entrepreneur who founded the Hong Kong–based real estate company Hang Lung Group.

Born and raised in the province of Guangdong, China, Chan moved to British Hong Kong in the 1940s because of the Chinese Civil War. He took an entry-level job in a bank and eventually built a successful real estate business. According to his son Gerald, he used to loan money to his friends to pay for their children's school fees. His wife, Tan Chingfen, was a nurse who, in the 1950s, gave cholera vaccinations to the neighbourhood children in the family kitchen.

After Gerald got a fellowship for his doctoral studies at Harvard, Chan was proud of his son, but disturbed that Gerald was taking the place of someone who could not pay. He told a friend, "We have the means to pay tuition. Why is Gerald taking the scholarship away from someone else?"

In 2014, his sons Ronnie and Gerald donated $350 million to Harvard University, which named the Harvard T.H. Chan School of Public Health after him. Harvard officials said the money would be used in four areas: pandemics, including obesity, cancer, and the Ebola outbreak in West Africa; harmful environments, including pollution and violence; poverty and humanitarian crises; and failing health systems.

Also in 2014, Ronnie Chan and his wife Barbara donated $20 million to the University of Southern California in honor of T.H. Chan's widow to name and endow the USC Mrs. T.H. Chan Division of Occupational Science and Occupational Therapy.

In 2021, the Chan family made an unrestricted gift of $175 million to the UMass Medical School, which changed its name to the UMass Chan Medical School in recognition of this donation.

In March 2022, the Morningside Academy for Design was founded with a $100 million gift from the Morningside Foundation, the philanthropic arm of the T.H. Chan family.
