= David Hunter (epidemiologist) =

Australian epidemiologist and cancer specialist

David Hunter AC
- Born: London, U.K.
- Citizenship: Australia, U.K., U.S.A.
- Education: Harvard School of Public Health
- Alma mater: University of Sydney Medical School
- Known for: Dean of the Faculty at the Harvard T.H. Chan School of Public Health
- Children: 1
- Scientific career
- Fields: Epidemiology, Oncology
- Institutions: Harvard T.H. Chan School of Public Health, University of Oxford

David John Hunter AC is an Australian epidemiologist and the Richard Doll Professor of Epidemiology and Medicine at Oxford Population Health. He was previously a professor in the Department of Epidemiology and the Department of Nutrition of Harvard University. He was associate epidemiologist at the Channing Laboratory, Brigham and Women's Hospital, where he was involved with the programs in breast cancer, cancer epidemiology, and cancer genetics research teams.

Hunter directs the Translational Epidemiology Unit (TEU) at Oxford Population Health, and leads a collaborative project between Oxford and the Harvard T.H. Chan School of Public Health.

== Early life and education ==
David Hunter was born in London, England and while a young child moved with his family to Sydney, Australia, where he earned his medical degree (MBBS) in 1982. He then moved to the United States for graduate study at the Harvard T.H. Chan School of Public Health, where he earned both a master's degree (MPH, 1985) and a doctorate (ScD, 1988) in public health.

== Career ==
Hunter spent 33 years at Harvard where he was Acting Dean of the Faculty and before that Dean for Academic Affairs at the Harvard T.H. Chan School of Public Health and Professor of Medicine at the Harvard Medical School in Boston. He is Vincent L. Gregory Professor in Cancer Prevention, Emeritus.

As of 2023, he is Richard Doll Professor of Epidemiology and Medicine at the University of Oxford.

In 2021, he was elected a Fellow of The Academy of Medical Sciences.

== Research ==
Hunter's principal career research interests are the aetiology of various cancers, particularly breast, colorectal, and skin cancers, and prostate cancer in men. He was an investigator on the Nurses' Health Study, a long-running cohort of 121,000 U.S. women, and was project director for the Nurses’ Health Study II, a cohort of 116,000 women followed since 1989. His focus is on genetic susceptibility to these cancers, and gene-environment interactions. This work was originally based in subcohorts of the Study and the Health Professionals Follow-Up Study of approximately 33,000 women and 18,000 men who have given a blood sample that can be used for DNA analysis.

=== Cancer Consortia ===
Until 2012, Hunter was co-chair of the Breast and Prostate Cancer Cohort Consortium and co-director of the Cancer Genetic Markers of Susceptibility (CGEMS) Special Initiative of the National Cancer Institute (NCI). These projects are large collaborative consortia in order to obtain the necessarily large sample sizes and to assess consistency of results across studies.

=== HIV research and global health ===
In the 1980s and 1990s, he collaborated with investigators in Kenya and Tanzania on early studies of HIV transmission, and subsequently he collaborated on studies of nutritional aspects of AIDS progression as they relate to child survival in affected populations. He co-edited a series of articles on global health which were published in the New England Journal of Medicine, for which he also serves as a statistical editor.

=== University of Oxford ===
In 2017, Hunter moved to the University of Oxford as the Richard Doll Professor of Epidemiology and Medicine in the Nuffield Department of Population Health (now the Oxford Population Health) and as a Governing Board Fellow of Green Templeton College. He directs a Unit focused on translating disease risk information into population health and clinical practice.

As of 2023, he is Chief Science Advisor to Our Future Health, a major initiative of the UK Government. In 2021, he was elected as a Fellow by distinction of the UK Faculty of Public Health, and elected as a Fellow of the UK Academy of Medical Sciences.

== Publications ==
- January 26, 2015, Most cancers not just "bad luck"
- NCBI publications for Dr. David Hunter
- Publications (Since 2012) for David Hunter

== Honours ==
Hunter was appointed as a Companion of the Order of Australia in the 2023 King's Birthday Honours for "eminent service to medicine as an epidemiologist, particularly in relation to disease prevention and early detection, and to the aetiology of breast, colorectal, prostate and skin cancers".
