= Christopher D. Golden =

American ecologist (born 1982)

Christopher Golden (born December 27, 1982, in Cohasset, Massachusetts) is an ecologist, professor and epidemiologist researching the human health impacts of environmental change, specifically in the context of global trends in biodiversity loss and ecosystem transformation.

== Biography ==
Golden was born in Cohasset, Massachusetts and received his B.A. at Harvard College in Environmental Conservation and MPH in epidemiology at University at the University of Berkeley, California. He completed a post-doctoral position at the Harvard University Center for the Environment.

Golden has been conducting ecological and public health research in Madagascar since 1999 about local people’s dependence on natural resources for obtaining adequate health. Golden has been leading a collaborative research program that evaluates the connections among fisheries management and ocean governance, climate change, and food security, and human nutrition in coastal populations around the world. This includes a case study in Kiribati sponsored by the National Science Foundation.

Golden is an Assistant Professor of Nutrition and Planetary Health at the Harvard T.H. Chan School of Public Health, in the Departments of Nutrition; Environmental Health; and Global Health and Population. He is also a Lifetime Fellow of the Explorer’s Club, and a National Geographic Explorer and Fellow. Most recently, he appeared in the National Geographic documentary “Virus Hunters.” Chris is also a member of the Scientific Advisory Boards for Oceana, the Rockefeller Foundation’s Periodic Table of Foods Initiative, and the IUCN Species Survival Commission.

Golden is also the Founder and Director of Madagascar Health and Environmental Research (MAHERY), a 501(c)3 non-profit launched in 2004. MAHERY was created to organize a community of Malagasy researchers trained in the field of planetary health, a discipline that investigates the human health impacts of global environmental change.

Christopher Golden was named an Emerging Explorer by National Geographic magazine in 2014.
