= Angela Cheung =

Canadian internal medicine specialist

- Spouse: Stephen W. Hwang

Academic background
- Education: BSc; MD 1988; PhD, 1997
- Alma mater: Bryn Mawr College; Johns Hopkins University; Harvard University
- Thesis: The Economic Impact of Primary Prevention: Methods and Applications of Cost-Effectiveness Analysis (1997)

Academic work
- Institutions: University of Toronto; University Health Network

Angela Man-Wei Cheung is a Canadian internal medicine specialist. At the University of Toronto, she is a Tier 1 Canada Research Chair, the KY and Betty Ho Chair of Integrative Medicine, and a senior scientist at Toronto General Hospital Research Institute and the Schroeder Arthritis Institute. Cheung also established the University of Toronto Center for Excellence in Skeletal Health Assessment and the Osteoporosis Program at the University Health Network.

== Early life and education ==
Cheung was born and raised to parents who immigrated from Hong Kong, China. She attended Bryn Mawr College for her Bachelor of Science degree before enrolling at Johns Hopkins University for her medical degree. While at Johns Hopkins, she met her future husband Stephen W. Hwang and they decided to move to Toronto for their residency to be closer to Cheung's parents. Following their residency, they returned to Boston. While Cheung pursued her doctoral degree in health policy at Harvard, Hwang joined the non-profit organization "Health Care for the Homeless" to assist people living on the streets and in emergency shelters. She published her dissertation entitled The Economic Impact of Primary Prevention: Methods and Applications of Cost-Effectiveness Analysis in 1997.

== Career ==
During her tenure as a professor at U of T, Cheung established the University of Toronto Center for Excellence in Skeletal Health Assessment and the Osteoporosis Program at the University Health Network. In 2012, Cheung received the Dr. David Sackett Senior Investigator from the Canadian Society of Internal Medicine for "excellence in research." In 2016, Cheung was named a Tier 1 Canada Research Chair in Musculoskeletal and Postmenopausal Health to "advance her research focused in the area of postmenopausal osteoporosis, especially in prevention and early diagnosis, and evaluation of new therapies and technologies." In 2018, she was recognized with the Chinese Canadian Legend Award by the Asian Business Network Association for her work in osteoporosis and women’s health research, and her contributions the community.

As a result of her osteoporosis research, Cheung was named an adviser for NASA to help assess the skeletal health of their astronauts under weightlessness. In 2019, Cheung was named the KY and Betty Ho Chair in Integrative Medicine which allowed her to begin developing a comprehensive treatment plan for physicians to discuss the benefits and risks of regular and alternative treatments.

During the COVID-19 pandemic, Cheung spearheaded numerous efforts to track the effects of Long COVID on Canadians. In April 2020, Cheung received funding for her project, the Ontario COVID-19 prospective cohort study, from the Toronto COVID-19 Action Fund. Using these funds, she collaborated with U of T colleague Margaret Herridge to establish the Canadian COVID-19 Prospective Cohort study (CanCOV). As the primary investigators, they lead an interdisciplinary team studying the short- and long-term outcomes for COVID-19 patients by looking at how genomics, demographics, social factors, and other variables influence disease progression and severity. Her efforts were recognized by Best Health magazine as she was named one of their 2021 Health Heroes.
