= Janina R. Galler =

Professor of Psychiatry

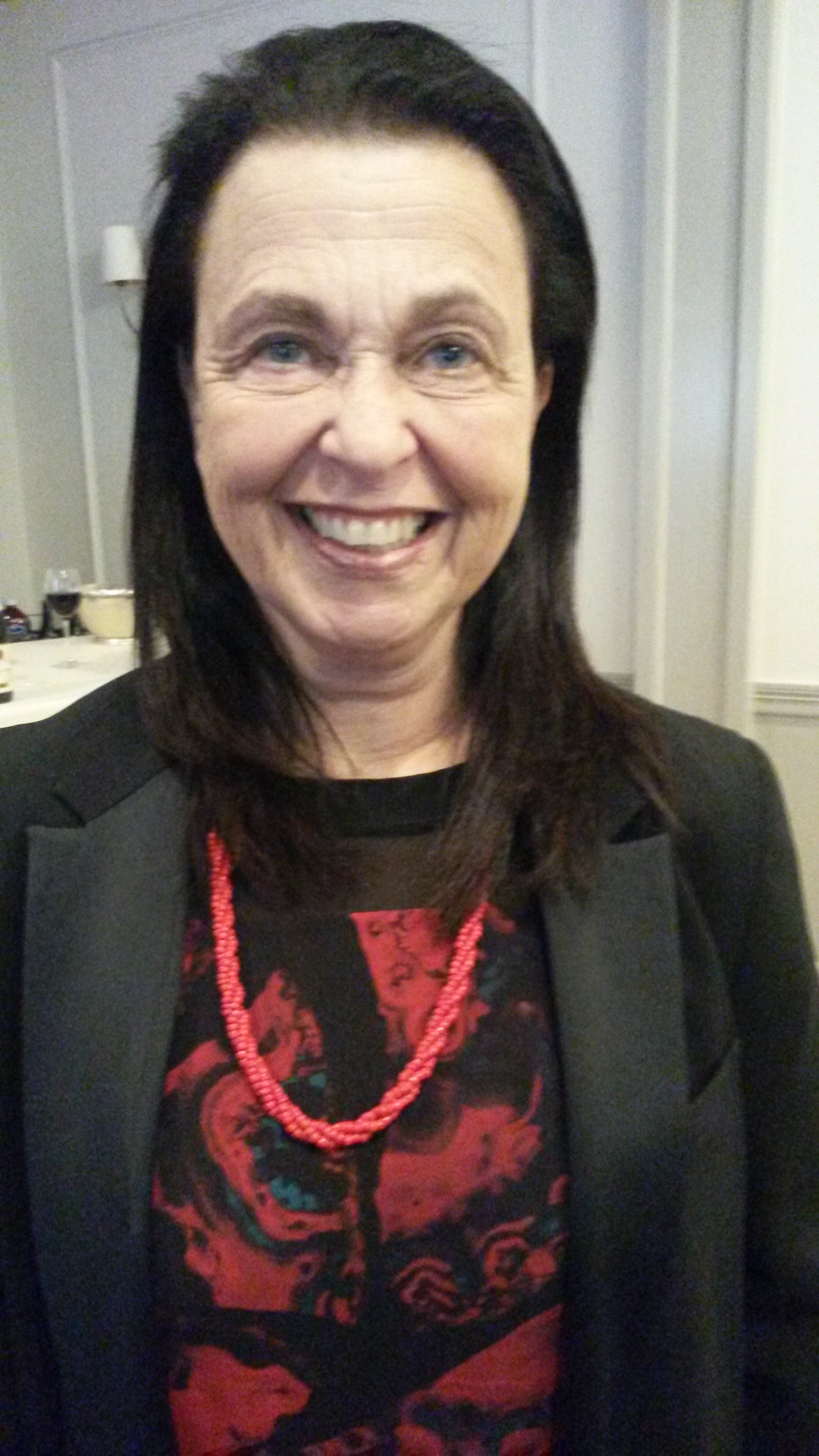
- Other name: Janina Galler
- Citizenship: United States
- Education: Sophie Newcomb College; Albert Einstein College of Medicine
- Known for: 45+-year longitudinal Barbados Nutrition Study
- Spouse(s): Burton D. Rabinowitz, MD
- Children: Loren G. Rabinowitz, MD, Danielle G. Rabinowitz, and Arielle G. Rabinowitz
- Awards: US Senate Fellow, First Recipient of the Joseph P. Kennedy Public Policy Leadership Award in Mental Retardation, Blanche F. Ittleson Award for Research in Child Psychiatry, 2016 Leon Eisenberg Award in Child Psychiatry
- Scientific career
- Fields: Psychiatry, Child Psychiatry
- Workplaces: Harvard Medical School Massachusetts General Hospital
- Thesis: (1972)
- Doctoral advisor: Herbert G. Birch (developmental psychologist)
- Website: https://connects.catalyst.harvard.edu/Profiles/display/Person/74587

Janina R. Galler is Professor of Psychiatry at Harvard Medical School, and a psychiatrist in the Chester M. Pierce MD Division of Global Psychiatry at Massachusetts General Hospital. She co-founded the 45-year Barbados Nutrition Study in the Lesser Antilles, in the Americas, with the late Sir Dr. Frank C. Ramsey, who was knighted for their joint efforts in eliminating malnutrition from Barbados. Dr. Galler has served as Director of this study since 1973. The Barbados Nutrition Study is a unique longitudinal study that has shown how the intergenerational legacy of poverty and disadvantage result from early childhood malnutrition and associated childhood adversities. A new facet of her research is its focus on epigenetics, or changes in gene expression that occur without change the structure of DNA. This new work explores potentially reversible mechanisms that explain how early malnutrition alters behavior and health over the life span and across generations.

In 1984, Galler published Nutrition and Behavior, part 3 in a 5-volume series, Human Nutrition: A Comprehensive Treatise. Galler has authored more than 200 publications and has edited two books on nutrition and behavior.

She also is a researcher in Pediatric Gastroenterology and Nutrition at the Massachusetts General Hospital and the Center for the Developing Child of Harvard University. She was previously a Senior Scientist at the Judge Baker Children's Center of Harvard Medical School in Boston's Longwood Medical Area.

Galler received more than 30 years of uninterrupted research support from the National Institutes of Health. During her career, she served as a member and chairperson of the National Advisory Council of the Eunice K. Shriver National Institutes of Child Health and Development (NICHD) and was a member of the NIH Directors Advisory Council. She was also President of the Albert Einstein College of Medicine Alumni Association (2016-2020).

== Education ==
- Sophie Newcomb College of Tulane University, Chemistry and Philosophy, summa cum laude, 1967-1969
- Albert Einstein College of Medicine, Doctor of Medicine, 1972
- Massachusetts General Hospital, residency training in Psychiatry and Child Psychiatry (began July 1, 1972)

In addition to English, Galler speaks and writes in Castilian Spanish, Hebrew, Portuguese, Swedish and Yiddish.

== Research ==
Galler's research focus is on early life malnutrition and its long-term, cascading effects on mental health development from childhood and over the life span. The also studies the intergenerational effects of childhood malnutrition. Her research has been conducted in low-resource settings and also in the laboratory, where she studies animal models of prenatal malnutrition. Since 1973, she has served as the Director of the 45+-year longitudinal Barbados Nutrition Study.
