= Real Estate Developers Association of Hong Kong =

- Abbreviation: REDA
- Formation: 1965
- Legal status: Not-for-profit organization
- Location: 1403 World-Wide House, 19 Des Voeux Road Central, Hong Kong
- Region served: Hong Kong
- President: Keith Herr
- Website: www.reda.hk

The Real Estate Developers Association of Hong Kong (REDA; Chinese: 香港地產建設商會) is a business organization representing the property development industry in Hong Kong. It was established in 1965 under the chairmanship of Henry Fok. The association's members included the 17 major developers in Hong Kong.

== History ==
In November 2020, REDA issued a statement supporting the decision to disqualify 4 pro-democracy lawmakers from the Legislative Council, stating that "The decision will help safeguard national sovereignty and implement 'one country, two systems'."

In January 2023, Stewart Leung Chi-kin from REDA said that developers would "make a lot of noise" if the government decided to repurpose a community isolation facility into public housing, and said "Repurposing that facility will ruin the entire Kai Tak area." On a separate plot of land also in Kai Tak, Leung said that developers were worried about traffic concerns if public housing were built there.

In February 2023, after the government stipulated that land leases cannot violate the national security law, Leung said that "The latest practice will not have an impact on a developer's desire to tender for land or not. It will not scare away foreigners who are true investors, but only those that hope to disturb and obstruct the city's development with political motives."

In February 2023, Leung also called for the government to end of stamp duties, saying "the Earth will not stop spinning" if stamp duties are eliminated. In April 2023, John Lee rebuffed Leung's request for the government to end measures to cool the property market.

In February 2024, REDA supported the implementation of Article 23 and said it was "the will of the people."

In July 2024, REDA said the San Tin Technopole in the Northern Metropolis should reduce a proposed 70-30 public-private housing ratio to 50-50 instead, reducing the amount of public housing.

== Executive Committee membership ==
As of November 2020

- Central Development
- Cheung Kong (Holdings)
- Chinachem Investment
- Hang Lung Properties
- Henderson Land Development
- Hongkong Land Property
- Hopewell Holdings
- Hutchison Properties
- Hysan Development
- The Great Eagle
- Lai Sun Development
- New World Development
- Shun Tak Holdings
- Sino Land
- Sun Hung Kai Properties
- Swire Properties
- Wheelock Properties

== See also ==
- Land and the Ruling Class in Hong Kong, a book that about the "property-cum-utility/public services conglomerates" of the city
