= Molecular pathological epidemiology =

Discipline combining epidemiology and pathology

Molecular pathological epidemiology (MPE, also molecular pathologic epidemiology) is a discipline combining epidemiology and pathology. It is defined as "epidemiology of molecular pathology and heterogeneity of disease". Pathology and epidemiology share the same goal of elucidating etiology of disease, and MPE aims to achieve this goal at molecular, individual and population levels. Typically, MPE utilizes tissue pathology resources and data within existing epidemiology studies. Molecular epidemiology broadly encompasses MPE and conventional-type molecular epidemiology with the use of traditional disease designation systems.

== Disease process ==
Data from The Cancer Genome Atlas projects indicate that disease evolution is an inherently heterogeneous process. Each patient has a unique disease process ("the unique disease principle"), considering the uniqueness of the exposome and its unique influence on molecular pathologic process. This concept has been adopted in clinical medicine along with precision medicine and personalized medicine.

== Methodology ==
In MPE, investigators dissect interrelationships between exposures (e.g., environmental, dietary, lifestyle and genetic factors); alterations in cellular or extracellular molecules (disease molecular signatures); and disease evolution and progression. Investigators can analyze genome, methylome, epigenome, metabolome, transcriptome, proteome, microbiome, immunity and interactome. A putative risk factor can be linked to specific molecular signatures.

MPE research enables identification of a new biomarker for potential clinical utility, using large-scale population-based data (e.g., PIK3CA mutation in colorectal cancer to select patients for aspirin therapy). The MPE approach can be used following a genome-wide association study (GWAS), termed "GWAS-MPE approach". Detailed disease endpoint phenotyping can be conducted by means of molecular pathology or surrogate histopathology or immunohistochemistry analysis of diseased tissues and cells within GWAS.

As an alternative approach, potential risk variants identified by GWAS can be examined in combination with molecular pathology analysis on diseased tissues. This GWAS-MPE approach can give not only more precise effect estimates, even larger effects, for specific molecular subtypes of the disease, but also insights into pathogenesis by linking genetic variants to molecular pathologic signatures of disease. Since molecular diagnostics is becoming routine clinical practice, molecular pathology data can aid epidemiologic research.

== History ==
MPE began as analysis of risk factors (e.g., smoking) and molecular pathological findings (e.g., KRAS G12C oncogene mutations in lung carcinoma).

Studies to examine the relationship between an exposure and molecular pathological signatures of disease (particularly, cancer) became increasingly common throughout the 1990s and early 2000s.

The use of molecular pathology in epidemiology lacked standardized methodologies and guidelines as well as interdisciplinary experts and training programs. MPE research required a new conceptual framework and methodologies (epidemiological method) because MPE examines heterogeneity in an outcome variable.

The term "molecular pathological epidemiology" was used by Shuji Ogino and Meir Stampfer in 2010. Specific principles of MPE developed following 2010. The MPE paradigm is in widespread use globally, and has been a subject of international conferences. The International Molecular Pathological Epidemiology (MPE) Meeting Series, which was established in 2013, has been open to the research community around the world, and five meetings were held through 2021.

== See also ==
- Causal inference
- Epidemiological method
- Epidemiology
- Evidence-based medicine
- Molecular diagnostics
- Molecular epidemiology
- Molecular medicine
- Molecular pathology
- Pathogenesis
- Pathology
- Personalized medicine
- Precision medicine
- Public health
- Systems biology
