= Hang Lung Properties =

Property developer in Hong Kong

Hang Lung Properties 恒隆地產
- Company type: Public company
- Traded as: SEHK: 101; Hang Seng Index component
- Industry: Real estate, Car park
- Founded: 1960
- Headquarters: 28/F, Standard Chartered Bank Building, Central, Hong Kong
- Area served: Hong Kong
- Key people: Ronnie Chan; Adriel Chan
- Parent: Hang Lung Group
- Website: hanglung.com

Hang Lung Properties
- Traditional Chinese: 恒隆地產
Transcriptions
Standard Mandarin
- Hanyu Pinyin: Hénglóng Dìchǎn
Yue: Cantonese
- Jyutping: hang4 lung4 dei6 caan2

Hang Lung Properties, formerly Amoy Properties and currently subsidiary of Hang Lung Group, is a property developer in Hong Kong. It is a member of Hang Seng Index Constituent Stocks (blue chip) and is headquartered in the Standard Chartered Bank Building in Central, Hong Kong.

== History ==
Hang Lung Properties Limited was incorporated in 1949 and was taken over by Hang Lung Group Limited in 1980. It became the property investment arm of Hang Lung Group Limited after the group re-organisation in 1987. The company is currently led by Adriel Chan.

As of June 2025, the company operates 10 properties across 8 cities in mainland China, with its Hangzhou project currently under development.

== Properties ==
The company's main properties include Standard Chartered Bank Building, Baskerville House, Hang Lung Centre in Causeway Bay, Kornhill Plaza, Grand Centre in Tsim Sha Tsui, as well as One and Two Grand Tower, Hollywood Plaza (Hong Kong), and the Park-In Commercial Centre in Mong Kok.

On 1 January 1991, Ronnie Chan took over as the group's chairman. He saw the opportunity to invest in mainland China market due to its economic growth, and thus the company began to venture into the mainland market under Chan's leadership. Its first step into the mainland came in 1992 with two landmark properties in Shanghai, Plaza 66 and Grand Gateway 66. Following the success of these projects, the company continued to expand into others parts of mainland China such as Wuxi, Shenyang, Jinan, Tianjin, Dalian, Kunming and Wuhan.

Hang Lung Properties in September 2020 bought the real estate assets in Hong Kong of the United States government.

== Management Board ==
The board has eight members, with three executive directors and five non-executive directors to ensure sufficient independence.

- Chair: Adriel Chan
- CEO: Weber Wai Pak Lo
- CFO: Kenneth Ka Kui Chiu

Non-executive directors:

- Philip Nan Lok Chen
- Nelson Wai Leung Yuen
- Andrew Ka Ching Chan
- Holly Tianfang Li
- Anita Yuen Mei Fung
