= Hang Lung Group =

Investment holding company

Hang Lung Group 恆隆集團有限公司
- Company type: Public
- Traded as: SEHK: 10
- Industry: Real estate, car park, property management, dry cleaning
- Founded: 13 September 1960
- Founder: T.H. Chan
- Headquarters: 28/F Standard Chartered Bank Building, Hong Kong
- Area served: Hong Kong; Mainland China
- Key people: Ronnie Chan (Hon. Chair); Adriel Chan (Chair); Weber Lo (CEO)
- Subsidiaries: Hang Lung Properties
- Website: hanglung.com

Hang Lung Group is an investment holding company that engages in property development for sales and leasing, as well as management of car parks, properties, and dry cleaning businesses. Its subsidiary Hang Lung Properties is one of the largest property developers in Hong Kong and also invests in the mainland China market. As of 2018, Hang Lung Group ranked number 1501 in the Forbes Global 2000 list.

== History ==
Hang Lung Group was founded by T.H. Chan on 13 September 1960 and is now one of Hong Kong's biggest real estate developers. For the first 32 years, the group operated its business mainly in Hong Kong. It became well known by developing the largest residential complexes along the Mass Transit Railway. The Hong Kong market suffered from a temporary collapse during the early 1980s owing to uncertainty surrounding the territory's return to China, but Hang Lung survived the turmoil. The group operates businesses in property development for sale and lease in Hong Kong. Its investment properties are diversified, ranging from retail and residential developments to industrial and office complexes.

In 1988, it gained control of Parry Corporation in Australia. On 1 January 1991, Ronnie Chan took over as the group's chairman. He foresaw the opportunity to invest in the mainland China market owing to its rapid economic growth. Its first step into the mainland, in Shanghai in 1992, was with two landmark properties, Plaza 66 and Grand Gateway 66. Following the success of its Shanghai projects, the group continued to expand its business to other parts of the mainland such as Shenyang, Jinan, Wuxi, Tianjin, Dalian, Kunming, and Wuhan.

=== List of chairmen ===
1. T.H. Chan (1960–1986); founder
2. Thomas Chen Tseng-tao (1986–1991); brother of T.H. Chan
3. Ronnie Chan (1991–2024); son of T.H. Chan
4. Adriel Chan (2024–present); son of Ronnie Chan

== See also ==
- Hang Lung Properties
