= Duane F. Bruley =

American academic

Duane Frederick Bruley is an American researcher, entrepreneur, and academician.

== Education ==
Bruley received a B.S. in Chemical Engineering at the University of Wisconsin–Eau Claire, an M.S. in Mechanical Engineering at Stanford University, ORSORT degree in Nuclear Engineering from Oak Ridge School of Reactor Technology, and his Ph.D. in Chemical Engineering from the University of Tennessee.

== Positions ==
In 1963, Bruley joined the faculty of Clemson University, where he was also head tennis coach. Bruley has served as Dean of the School of Engineering at the University of Maryland, Baltimore County, Dean of Engineering at the California Polytechnic State University, San Luis Obispo, Vice President of Academic Affairs at Rose-Hulman Institute of Technology, Head of Biomedical Engineering and Director of the Rehabilitation Engineering and Environmental Systems at the National Science Foundation, and Head of the Chemical Engineering Department at Tulane University. Dr. Bruley is a co-founder and former president (1983) of the International Society on Oxygen Transport to Tissue (ISOTT) and one of the contributors to the formation of the Bioengineering Section at the NSF and initiator of a joint review and funding effort between the NSF and the National Institutes of Health (NIH).

== Work ==
Bruley's field of research includes oxygen transfer in the brain and human tissue, simulation of the human microcirculation system, and symbiosis of biomedical and bioprocess engineering utilizing the principles of Total Quality Management to enhance health care quality and delivery. This latter research has led to a computational strategy (BWK) that performs 3-D, time dependent, heterogeneous, convection, diffusion, conduction, reaction simulations on small computers. Bruley's work also spans bioprocess engineering for the production of anticoagulants (particularly, PROTEIN C) and hyperthermia.

Bruley and James Haim I. Bicher have extensively worked and researched together in the field of oxygen transport. Both scientists had joined, published, and collaborated in about eighteen papers, many of which can be found in PubMed, US National Library of Medicine National Institutes of Health

== Honors and awards ==
In 2003 ISOTT established The Duane F. Bruley Award. This award was created to provide travel funds for student researchers in all aspects of areas of oxygen transport to tissue. The breath of Bruley's contributions to engineering administration, research, education, and public service is reflected in his election to Fellow Grade in AIChE and ASME and to Founding Fellow of the American Institute for Medical and Biological Engineering (AIMBE). He has published more than 180 papers.
