= B. John Garrick =

American engineer (1930–2020)

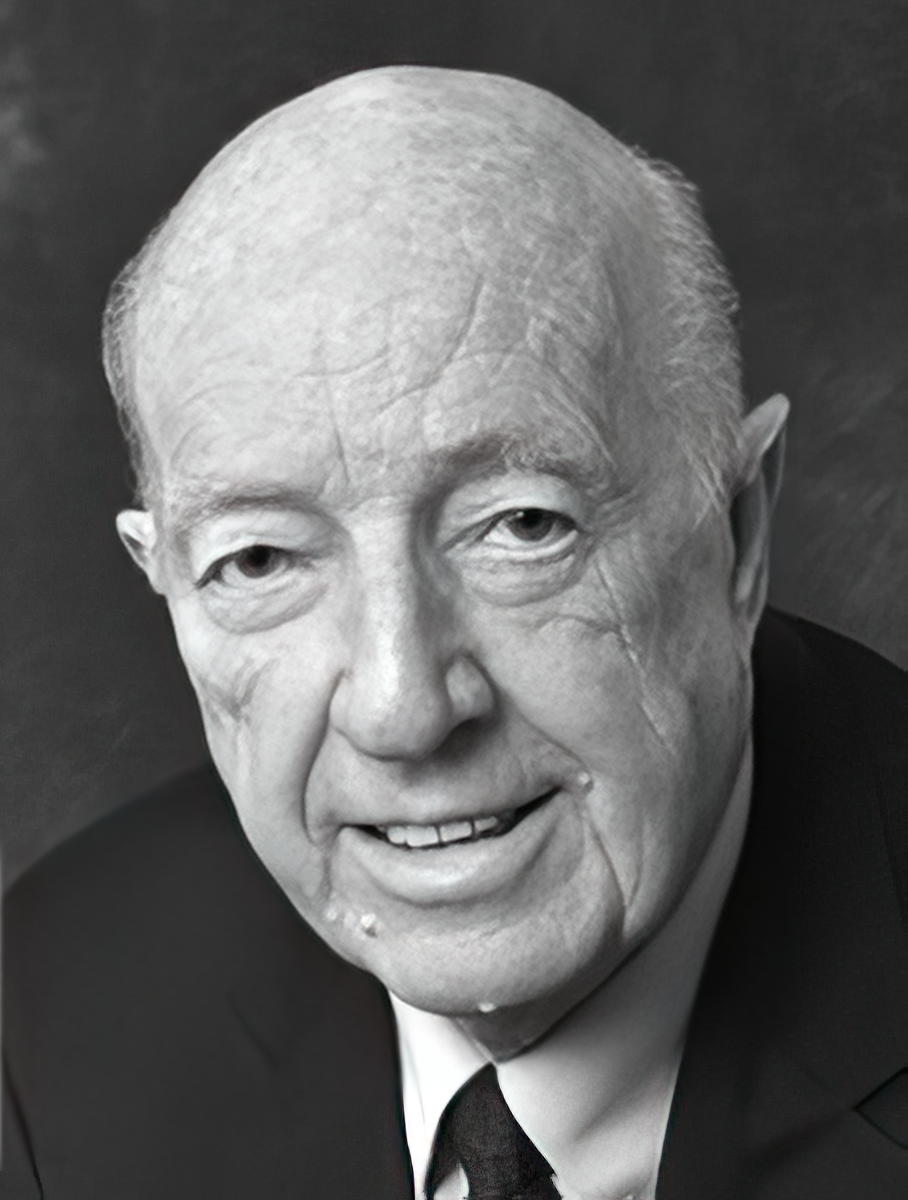
- Garrick in 2010
- Born: March 5, 1930; Tintic, Utah, U.S.
- Died: November 1, 2020 (aged 90); Newport Beach, California, U.S.
- Education: Brigham Young University (B.S., 1952); Oak Ridge School of Reactor Technology (Certificate, 1955); University of California, Los Angeles (M.S., 1962; Ph.D., 1968)
- Known for: Probabilistic risk assessment
- Spouse: Amelia Madson Garrick (m. 1952)
- Children: 3
- Awards: Elected to the National Academy of Engineering (1993); Fellow of the American Nuclear Society; Fellow of the Society for Risk Analysis; Fellow of the Institute for the Advancement of Engineering
- Scientific career
- Fields: Nuclear engineering · Risk sciences
- Workplaces: Holmes & Narver; PLG, Inc.; University of California, Los Angeles; United States Atomic Energy Commission
- Thesis: Unified Systems Safety for Nuclear Power Plants (1968)

B. John Garrick (March 5, 1930 – November 1, 2020) was an American nuclear engineer and risk scientist recognized as a pioneer in the development of Probabilistic risk assessment (PRA). Across a career spanning more than five decades, he founded the consulting firm PLG, Inc. to apply quantitative risk methods to complex engineered systems in fields such as nuclear power, aerospace, chemical processing, and transportation. Garrick's early research, including his 1968 doctoral dissertation at the University of California, Los Angeles, helped establish an analytical framework now widely adopted to quantify the likelihood and consequences of low-probability, high-impact events. He received multiple honors for his contributions, notably election to the National Academy of Engineering for “making quantitative risk assessment an applied science and a fundamental part of engineering design.”

Garrick served two terms as chairman of the U.S. Nuclear Waste Technical Review Board (2004–2012) following his appointment by President George W. Bush. He was a Distinguished Adjunct Professor at UCLA and played an active role in launching the university's B. John Garrick Institute for the Risk Sciences with a significant philanthropic gift in 2014. Among other professional distinctions, he was a Fellow of the American Nuclear Society, the Society for Risk Analysis, and the Institute for the Advancement of Engineering.

== Early life and education ==
B. John Garrick was born on March 5, 1930, in the small railroad and mining town of Tintic (now part of Eureka, Utah). His family's frequent moves during the Great Depression led Garrick to attend nine different schools by the ninth grade. He attended high school in Provo, Utah. He graduated in 1952 with a Bachelor of Science degree in physics from Brigham Young University, having been affiliated with the Gamma Tau social unit and the Sigma Pi Sigma physics honor society. Garrick married Amelia Ann Madson on September 18, 1952; she had completed a B.S. in secretarial practice at BYU the previous year.

In mid-1952, Garrick began working for the Phillips Petroleum Company's Atomic Energy Division in Idaho Falls. Soon thereafter, he joined the Idaho Chemical Processing Plant (later part of the Idaho National Laboratory).

In 1954, he was accepted into the Oak Ridge School of Reactor Technology, an intensive year-long program designed to train nuclear engineers at a time when much of the field remained classified.

In 1962, he earned a Master of Science in Nuclear Engineering from the University of California, Los Angeles (UCLA). Six years later, he completed a Ph.D. in Engineering and Applied Sciences at UCLA. His dissertation, titled Unified Systems Safety for Nuclear Power Plants, developed early analytical concepts that would evolve into modern probabilistic risk assessment methods.

== Early career ==
Garrick began his professional work in 1952 as a junior-level physicist at the Idaho Chemical Processing Plant (later part of the Idaho National Laboratory). In 1955, he joined the U.S. Atomic Energy Commission (AEC) in Washington, D.C., where he served on the Hazards Evaluation Branch reviewing the safety of the nation's nuclear reactors. During this period, he was the principal technical reviewer for the Vallecitos boiling water reactor—the first civilian nuclear reactor to receive a commercial license in the United States.

In 1957, Garrick moved to the Los Angeles–based engineering firm Holmes & Narver, Inc. He initially held the position of Chief Nuclear Scientist, later becoming Vice President of its Nuclear Division and director of the Advanced Technology Group. His work at Holmes & Narver involved broad applications of nuclear science and engineering, laying key groundwork for what would become his long-term focus on quantitative risk assessment.

== Development of the risk triplet ==
In 1975, Garrick co-founded the consulting firm PLG, Inc. (Pickard, Lowe & Garrick), one of the earliest companies dedicated solely to quantitative risk assessment for nuclear facilities, chemical plants, and other high-hazard enterprises. Under his leadership, PLG conducted some of the first full-scope probabilistic risk studies of U.S. commercial nuclear power plants, including the pioneering work at the Oyster Creek Nuclear Generating Station. These early assessments integrated external events such as earthquake hazards and introduced Bayesian methods to manage uncertain data.

In 1981, Garrick and longtime collaborator Stan Kaplan published a seminal paper in the journal Risk Analysis that introduced the “risk triplet” concept:

- What can go wrong?
- What is the likelihood of it happening?
- And what are the consequences?

Their framework became widely adopted in nuclear safety analysis and eventually spread to other high-consequence industries, helping establish probabilistic risk assessment as a cornerstone of modern engineering practice.

== Academic and consulting career ==
Beginning in the late 1970s, Garrick maintained active ties to academia while overseeing PLG, Inc. He was a frequent lecturer in nuclear engineering courses at the Massachusetts Institute of Technology and served as an adjunct professor at Vanderbilt University. After retiring from PLG in 1997, he continued to consult independently on high-profile projects involving the safety of nuclear power plants, chemical facilities, and space systems, such as the Space Shuttle program and defense-related applications.

At the University of California, Los Angeles (UCLA), Garrick was appointed as a Distinguished Adjunct Professor of Materials Science and Engineering, where he advised graduate students and taught courses in quantitative risk assessment. He also served on the Dean's Advisory Council—later the Dean's Executive Board—at the UCLA Samueli School of Engineering. His involvement in academic curriculum development, workshops, and seminars helped advance probabilistic methods in the broader engineering community.

== U.S. Government Service ==
In September 2004, Garrick was appointed by President George W. Bush as chairman of the U.S. Nuclear Waste Technical Review Board, serving two consecutive terms until September 2012. He also contributed for ten years (1994–2004), including four years as chair, to the U.S. Nuclear Regulatory Commission’s Advisory Committee on Nuclear Waste.

Garrick was elected to the National Academy of Engineering (NAE) in 1993 for “making quantitative risk assessment an applied science and a fundamental part of engineering design.” He went on to chair the NAE's Committee on Combating Terrorism and contributed to numerous National Academies committees, examining topics such as geologic waste disposal, space missions, automotive safety, and the management of nuclear materials. He also served as vice chair and technical lead of the National Research Council's Committee on Lessons Learned from the Fukushima Nuclear Accident for Improving Safety of U.S. Nuclear Plants, providing guidance on strengthening the security and safety of nuclear facilities in the United States.

=== Yucca Mountain testimony ===
While chairing the Nuclear Waste Technical Review Board (NWTRB), Garrick provided testimony to the U.S. House of Representatives’ Subcommittee on the Federal Workforce and Agency Organization in April 2005, outlining the NWTRB's ongoing review of the scientific and technical aspects of the Yucca Mountain repository proposal. In his remarks, he stressed the Board's role in offering independent evaluations of the Department of Energy’s data and analyses, and emphasized the importance of thorough investigations into potential issues with repository performance and scientific integrity.

Outside of official testimonies, Garrick also contributed a “pro” perspective on Yucca Mountain in a IEEE Spectrum editorial, arguing that indefinite on-site spent-fuel storage was not a viable long-term solution and that a carefully engineered geologic repository—backed by robust probabilistic risk assessments—could offer greater nuclear safety and security. He acknowledged weaknesses in some DOE analyses but maintained that subsequent oversight from the Nuclear Regulatory Commission and adherence to risk-informed regulation could address remaining uncertainties.

== Research ==
Garrick's research focused on quantitative methods to evaluate the safety and reliability of high-hazard systems. He authored or coauthored more than 250 technical papers and reports on reliability, risk engineering, and safety analysis.

Notably, his published works include:

- Quantifying and Controlling Catastrophic Risks (Foreword by George E. Apostolakis, Elsevier Academic Press, 2008), on PRA applications for low-probability, high-consequence events.
- The Analysis, Communication, and Perception of Risk (co-edited with W.C. Gekler, Plenum Press, 1991), featuring research papers and case studies in engineering and public policy.
- Power Plant Availability Engineering (Electric Power Research Institute, 1982), which introduced probabilistic techniques for improving power-generation reliability.

He also contributed to multi-author volumes on nuclear energy, risk communication, and engineering safety, and delivered short-course lectures at universities and industry symposia. His research influenced regulatory frameworks at the Nuclear Regulatory Commission, the Department of Energy, international space agencies, and private-sector firms seeking PRA-driven approaches for design, licensing, and crisis management. Through his publications, teaching, and public service, he helped make PRA a cornerstone of modern engineering risk analysis.

== Awards and recognition ==
Garrick's contributions to risk assessment and nuclear science earned him the 2019 W. Bennett Lewis Award for Sustainable Energy and Development from the American Nuclear Society. He was a fellow of the American Nuclear Society, the Society for Risk Analysis, and the Institute for the Advancement of Engineering.

== Legacy ==
=== The B. John Garrick Institute for the Risk Sciences ===
In 2014, Garrick and his wife, Amelia, donated US$9 million to the UCLA Henry Samueli School of Engineering and Applied Science, establishing the B. John Garrick Institute for the Risk Sciences. Conceived as an umbrella organization uniting multiple research programs, the institute focuses on developing risk-science methodologies and interdisciplinary strategies to mitigate large-scale, low-probability threats—from nuclear accidents and extreme weather events to critical infrastructure failures.

Garrick viewed the institute as a means to formalize and expand the foundations of probabilistic risk assessment, integrating expertise from across engineering, applied science, mathematics, policy, and other relevant fields. In announcing the gift, Garrick highlighted the impetus behind the institute's creation, stating, “We must meet the challenge of managing [twenty-first-century] threats with new thinking, methods, tools, and applications.” While serving as a Distinguished Adjunct Professor at UCLA, he remained active in shaping the institute's direction—providing guidance on research priorities, mentoring junior scholars in quantitative risk methods, and championing public outreach to raise awareness of advanced approaches to risk management.

From its inception, the B. John Garrick Institute for the Risk Sciences has hosted workshops, symposia, and training programs designed to bring together industry practitioners, government regulators, and academic researchers. These events address global challenges—including nuclear-waste disposal, space-mission assurance, cybersecurity, and climate-driven risks—and frequently draw on Garrick's foundational PRA framework, emphasizing the importance of data-driven, interdisciplinary solutions. The institute continues to expand upon Garrick's vision by supporting student scholarships, sponsoring collaborative research projects, and disseminating findings through peer-reviewed publications and public forums.
