= Ali Mosleh =

Ali Mosleh may refer to:

- Shayan Mosleh, Iranian footballer
- Ali Mosleh (engineer), American engineer
