= Misinformation about the 2024 Atlantic hurricane season =

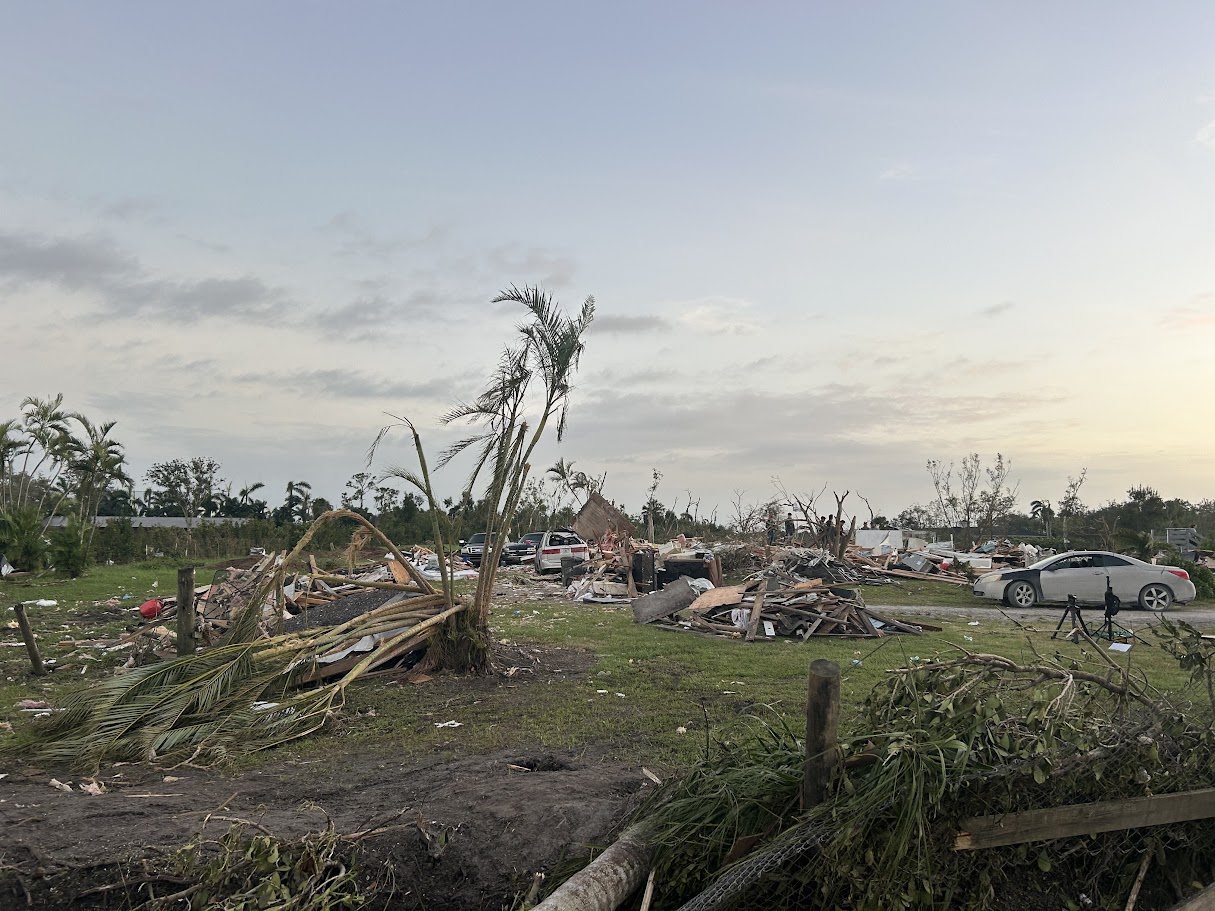
Devastation from a tornado in Wellington, Florida, caused by Hurricane Milton

Late in the 2024 Atlantic hurricane season, misinformation and conspiracy theories spread about the nature of Hurricane Helene and Hurricane Milton, and about the post-storm disaster recoveries. False information was spread by multiple politicians including Donald Trump, who was the 2024 Republican presidential candidate, and congresswoman Marjorie Taylor Greene. These widespread rumors caused difficulties for first responders and official recovery workers, hampering rescue efforts, and some officials were subject to threats of violence. The White House and Federal Emergency Management Agency (FEMA) issued statements in response to these claims, and investigative hearings that involved efforts to combat this misinformation.

== Background ==
In early 2024, hurricane forecasters predicted a highly-active season, citing the La Niña effect and warm sea surface temperatures. After the earliest-forming Category 5 hurricane on record, Hurricane Beryl, the US National Oceanic and Atmospheric Administration (NOAA) maintained this prediction through August. In what was expected to be the peak season, however, there were few storms, and some called the season a "bust".

In late September and early October, Hurricanes Helene and Milton developed as Category 4 and 5 hurricanes, respectively, breaking the lull. Helene caused extensive damage across the Southeastern United States, becoming the deadliest hurricane to strike the US mainland since Hurricane Katrina. In particular, the hurricane caused flooding in western North Carolina, hundreds of miles from the coast; NOAA described this unusually high inland rainfall as a "worst-case scenario" for the region. Milton underwent rapid intensification from 6–7 October, strengthening to a Category 5 and increasing its wind speeds by 95 miles per hour (153 km/h) in 24 hours, the third-fastest intensification on record. The season became the second costliest in history, with $190 billion in damages, and broke records for amount of storm activity in the later period of a hurricane season.

== Claims ==
=== Weather modification ===
Congresswoman Marjorie Taylor Greene of Georgia's 14th congressional district claimed in a tweet on October 3 that it is possible to use weather modification to influence hurricanes. Three days later, Greene made another post claiming weather modification was possible and in use. Prominent right-wing conspiracy theorist Alex Jones made claims that Hurricanes Milton and Helene were "weather weapons" created by the US government. Meteorologists Matthew Cappucci, Katie Nickolaou, and James Spann claimed to have received threats, accusing them of concealing that the US government was controlling the hurricane.

Marjorie Taylor Greene
(@mtgreenee)
tweeted:

Yes they can control the weather. It’s ridiculous for anyone to lie and say it can’t be done.

October 3, 2024

Claims that the High-frequency Active Auroral Research Program (HAARP) research project in Alaska can modify the weather have existed since at least 2012. Agence France-Presse reported on popular social media posts claiming that the device created the storm; however, a research scientist at the University of Alaska Fairbanks, which runs the project, stated that is too low-powered to control weather. Likewise, the nationwide weather radar system known as Next-Generation Radar (NEXRAD) was the subject of claims that it could be used to control weather patterns. As a radar system it emits only a small amount of energy, which NOAA's Hurricane Research Division states is too low to influence weather.

In research prior to the 2024 season, researchers have considered the social and ethical impacts of hurricane modification. In 2012, a survey found that proposals for weather modification to redirect hurricane paths induced feelings of anger in Florida residents. The US government retired hurricane seeding experiments in 1983 after attempts proved futile and in 1998 the American Meteorological Society adopted an official position considering it unfeasible.

=== FEMA blocking aid ===
USA Today reported on viral social media posts claiming that law enforcement in North Carolina were seeking to arrest Federal Emergency Management Agency (FEMA) staff for allegedly hindering relief work, a claim denied by state officials. Elon Musk faced criticism from The Atlantic, NPR, and Politico for amplifying claims without evidence that FEMA had been expropriating aid shipments, blocking private citizens from rendering aid, and that sheriffs in North Carolina had threatened to arrest FEMA staff. The Twitter account for fake news website Real Raw News falsely claimed that the United States Marine Corps were using snipers to kill FEMA employees. US Secretary of Homeland Security Alejandro Mayorkas, FEMA Director of Public Affairs Jaclyn Rothenberg, and Asheville Mayor Esther Manheimer received antisemitic attacks online and claimed to have feared for their safety in response work. FEMA received credible threats of violence directed at its staff, including calls for militias to shoot emergency responders. One armed man acting alone was arrested in Rutherford County, North Carolina, on October 14, 2024 for making threats against FEMA employees; as a result, aid workers relocated their work from the county.

On November 9, 2024, FEMA Administrator Deanne Criswell released an official statement announcing that a FEMA employee had "advise[d] her survivor assistance team to not go to homes with yard signs supporting President-elect Trump". Criswell referred to the act as "reprehensible". The alleged discrimination occurred in Florida, and the employee was fired for these alleged actions. Florida Attorney General Ashley Moody filed a federal lawsuit against FEMA in response to the allegation of discrimination.

=== Land acquisition ===
PBS News Hour reported on a belief that the US government was using the disaster to seize land, in particular destroyed homes. Following Hurricane Helene, rumors spread online that Chimney Rock, North Carolina, had been intentionally abandoned by relief officials so that the federal government could mine lithium after evacuating the residents or after leaving the residents for dead. County officials denied any plans of the sort. In Florida, WUSF reported similar rumors that spread in the days leading up to Hurricane Milton's landfall, which caused the governor's office to rebut claims of FEMA seizing Floridians' homes.

=== Expenditure of relief funds on migrants ===
On October 3, Donald Trump accused the Biden administration of spending FEMA disaster relief funds on housing for "illegal migrants", and he claimed that the agency had run out of funding for disaster recovery efforts. Ohio Representative Jim Jordan similarly claimed that disaster funds had gone to house migrants. Elon Musk amplified the claim on Twitter, indicating that he viewed FEMA's alleged expenditures on migrants as "treason" and endorsing a call for Homeland Security Secretary Alejandro Mayorkas to be arrested. The Washington Post found no evidence that FEMA had redirected any disaster relief funding to migrant resettlement, and the agency stated that it had continued to spend money towards relief efforts.

=== AI-generated images ===
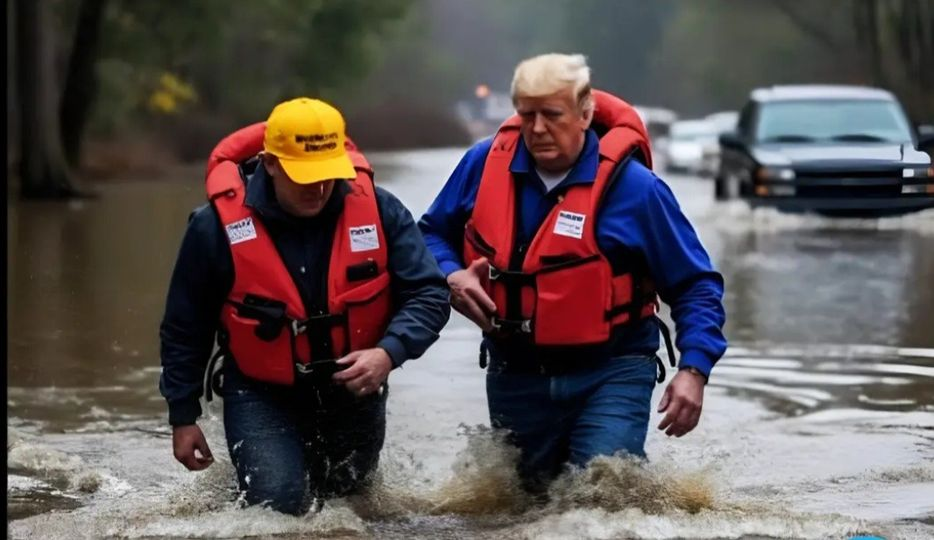
AI-generated image of Donald Trump assisting in disaster relief, shared online in September 2024

On social media, multiple viral AI-generated images spread supposedly depicting the hurricane and its response. The Knoxville News Sentinel reported on one image of a flooded town that was claimed to be Gatlinburg, Tennessee, prompting a response from town officials that the town was not flooded and safe to visit.

After Helene, an AI-generated image of a girl holding a puppy while sitting in a boat floating on flooded waters circulated among Republicans, who used it as evidence of alleged failures of the Biden administration to respond to the disaster. The Atlantic noted that some politicians did not retract the image after learning it was fake, "insisting that it's real on some deeper level". Another image cited by USA Today depicted Donald Trump wading through floodwaters to rescue people, despite Trump wearing different clothing during his visit to the area. Following Milton's track across Florida, AI-generated images depicting flooding in Walt Disney World posted to Telegram by Russian state news agency RIA Novosti were republished by Russian news networks. AI- and computer-generated images supposedly documenting the hurricane's tornado outbreak were widely shared, including by British tabloid The Mirror. Reuters quoted an anonymous US intelligence official who claimed Russian and Chinese influence operations spread AI-generated misinformation related to the hurricanes.

== Effects ==
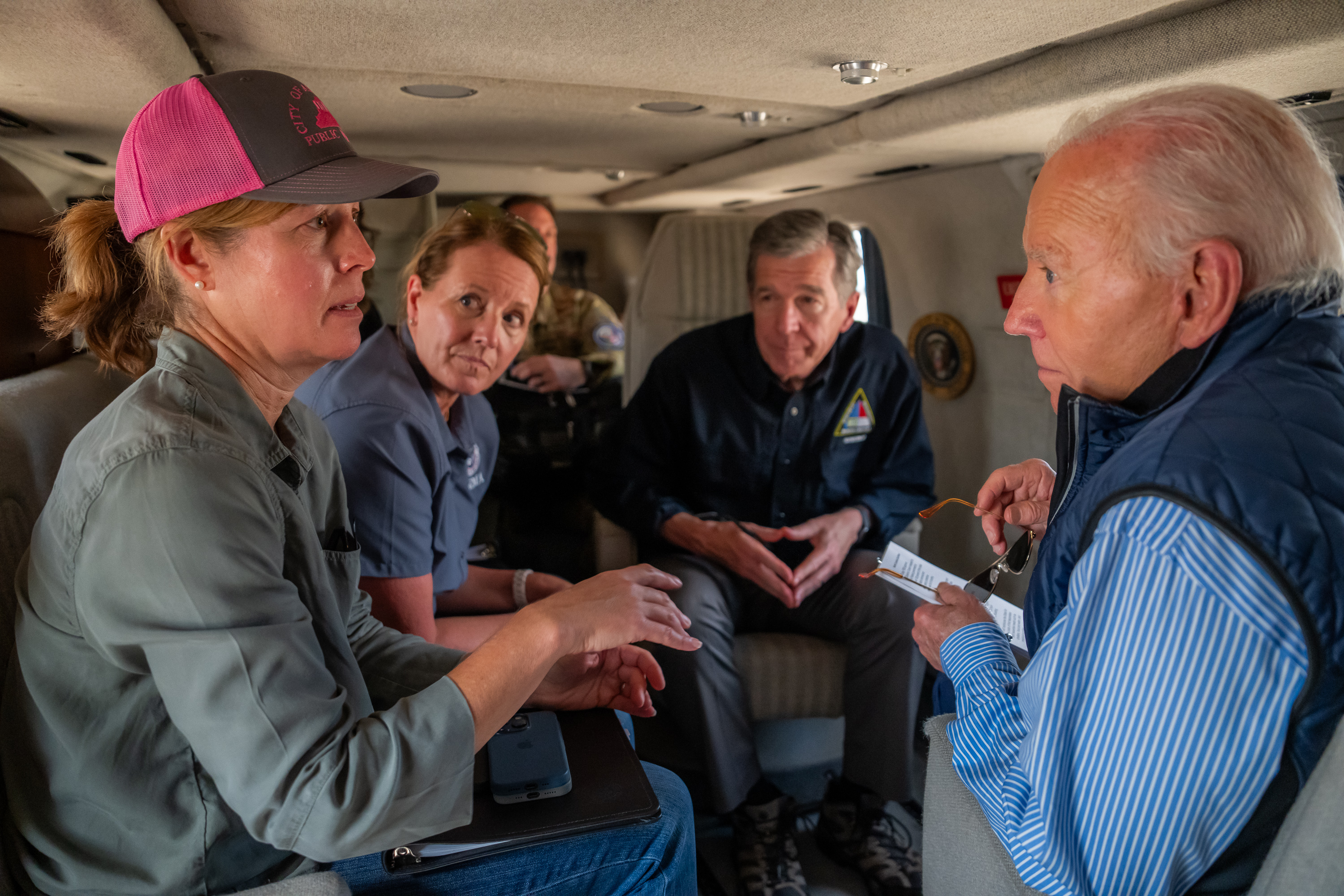
Asheville Mayor Esther Manheimer, FEMA director Deanne Criswell, North Carolina Governor Roy Cooper, and President Joe Biden speaking during an aerial tour to survey damage caused by Hurricane Helene aboard Marine One on October 2, 2024

Multiple commentators alleged that Republican Party politicians' promotion of these claims was intended to gain an advantage in the 2024 United States presidential election. Jim Puzzanghera in The Boston Globe claimed that the party was "seeking [an] edge" in hurricane-battered Georgia because it is a swing state, "exploiting the trauma" by using claims about the Biden administration's response efforts to reduce support for Kamala Harris's campaign. The Guardian misinformation reporter Rachel Leingang argued that misinformation was likely so prevalent due to the proximity to the election, quoting a fellow at the American Immigration Council who claimed that "there's no question that this level of falsehoods would not be spread were there not an election a month away".

Local officials and relief workers have had to expend resources combatting misinformation that might otherwise have been used toward first response work. FEMA and White House officials have expressed concern that survivors and others impacted by the storms may be less likely to seek relief from the agency due to the misinformation. In response, the White House directed federal agencies to engage with the public on social media with evidence the government was on the ground helping relief efforts. FEMA added a page on its website to rebut claims. Republican Congressman Chuck Edwards, who represents North Carolina's 11th congressional district which was heavily affected by Hurricane Helene, released a statement to his constituents rebutting several claims. Writing in The Atlantic, former US Department of Homeland Security official Juliette Kayyem gave particular criticism to Twitter under Elon Musk, where she argued recent changes to content moderation had made it more difficult to discern reliable sources.

Between November 2024 and March 2025, the United States Congress held four televised investigative hearings on the federal government's response to, overall recovery efforts from, and criminal events following Helene and Milton. Misinformation from the hurricanes was discussed amid the hearings, including misinformation spoken by President Trump and how FEMA was working to combat misinformation.

== See also ==
- Chemtrail conspiracy theory – Conspiracy theory about contrails
- Climate engineering – Deliberate and large-scale intervention in Earth's climate system
- Cloud seeding – Weather modification that condenses clouds to cause rainfall
- Cloudbuster – Pseudoscientific rain maker
- Fake news in the United States
- FEMA camps conspiracy theory – Belief that US citizens will be imprisoned as a New World Order is established
- List of conspiracy theories promoted by Donald Trump
- Post-truth politics – Politics in which facts are considered irrelevant
- QAnon – American conspiracy theory and political movement
- Weather modification in North America

== Bibliography ==
=== Academic works ===
- "Policy statement". Bulletin of the American Meteorological Society. 79 (12): 2771–2772. 1998. Bibcode:1998BAMS...79.2771.. doi:10.1175/1520-0477-79.12.2771.
- Byford, Jovan (2011). Conspiracy theories: A critical introduction. Palgrave Macmillan. doi:10.1057/9780230349216. ISBN 978-0-230-34921-6. OCLC 729342636. OL 16461639W.
- Keeley, Brian L. (2024). "Conspiracy theorists are not the problem; Conspiracy liars are". Inquiry: An Interdisciplinary Journal of Philosophy. 68 (8): 2744–2764. doi:10.1080/0020174X.2024.2375771.
- Hyzen, Aaron; Van den Bulck, Hilde (2021). "'The most paranoid man in America': Alex Jones as celebrity populist". Celebrity Studies. 12 (1): 162–166. doi:10.1080/19392397.2019.1691756.
- Klima, Kelly; de Bruin, Wändi Bruine; Morgan, M. Granger; Grossmann, Iris (2012). "Public perceptions of hurricane modification". Risk Analysis. 32 (7): 1194–1206. Bibcode:2012RiskA..32.1194K. doi:10.1111/j.1539-6924.2011.01717.x. PMID 22050325.
- Klima, Kelly; Morgan, M. Granger (2012). "Thoughts on whether government should steer a tropical cyclone if it could". Journal of Risk Research. 15 (8): 1013–1020. doi:10.1080/13669877.2012.686054.
- Morgan, M. Granger; Dowlatabadi, Hadi (2023). "We have no choice but to adapt". In Morgan, M. Granger (ed.). Interdisciplinary Research on Climate and Energy Decision Making: 30 Years of Research on Global Change. Research and Teaching in Environmental Studies. Routledge. pp. 208–218. doi:10.4324/9781003330226-16. ISBN 978-1-003-33022-6. OCLC 1349650984. OL 28622955W.
- Munro, Daniel (2024). "Conspiracy theories and the epistemic power of narratives". Philosophical Psychology. 38 (8): 3661–3686. doi:10.1080/09515089.2024.2381538.
- Van den Bulck, Hilde; Hyzen, Aaron (2020). "Of lizards and ideological entrepreneurs: Alex Jones and Infowars in the relationship between populist nationalism and the post-global media ecology". International Communication Gazette. 82 (1): 42–59. doi:10.1177/1748048519880726.
- Willoughby, H. E.; Jorgensen, D. P.; Black, R. A.; Rosenthal, S. L. (1985). "Project STORMFURY: A scientific chronicle 1962–1983". Bulletin of the American Meteorological Society. 66 (5): 505–514. Bibcode:1985BAMS...66..505W. doi:10.1175/1520-0477(1985)066<0505:PSASC>2.0.CO;2.

=== Newspapers ===
- Aguilar, Hannah (October 26, 2024). "Cuban government claims Guantánamo dam remained intact during Hurricane Oscar". CubaHeadlines. Archived from the original on November 6, 2024.
- Alsharif, Mirna (November 9, 2024). "FEMA employee fired after advising hurricane relief team not to visit Florida homes with Donald Trump signs". NBC News. Archived from the original on November 26, 2024.
- Alvarez, Priscilla; Lyngaas, Sean; Tausche, Kayla; Muntean, Pete (October 9, 2024). "Inside the White House's desperate scramble to swat down hurricane misinformation". CNN. Archived from the original on October 10, 2024.
- Aton, Adam; Waldman, Scott (October 8, 2024). "Elon Musk is piling onto all the hurricane disinformation, hampering relief efforts". Politico. Archived from the original on October 8, 2024.
- Brady, Jeff; Baker, Liz (October 7, 2024). "Helene recovery is more political online than on the ground". NPR. Archived from the original on October 7, 2024.
- Byik, Andre (October 10, 2024). "No, North Carolina police didn't threaten FEMA arrests". Fact Check. USA Today. Archived from the original on November 15, 2024.
- "Hear from fired FEMA employee accused of skipping homes of Trump supporters". CNN. November 16, 2024. Archived from the original on November 17, 2024.
- Dickie, Gloria (October 9, 2024). "Why did Hurricane Milton intensify so quickly into a Category 5 storm?". Reuters.
- Doty, Kelly (October 9, 2024). "Republican lawmaker rejects 'outrageous' conspiracy theories about Helene response in NC". WLOS. Archived from the original on October 10, 2024.
- Dunbar, Marina (October 7, 2024). "Marjorie Taylor Greene condemned over Helene weather conspiracy theory". The Guardian. Archived from the original on October 7, 2024.
- Dupré, Maggie Harrison (October 10, 2024). "Meteorologists are getting death threats from insane hurricane conspiracy theorists". Futurism. Archived from the original on November 6, 2024.
- Elliott, Debbie (November 14, 2024). "Florida sues FEMA for discrimination accusing it of denying aid to Trump supporters". NPR. Archived from the original on November 15, 2024.
- Ferris, Layla (October 7, 2024). "Hurricane Helene conspiracy theories about lithium mining, weather control spread widely". CBS News. Archived from the original on October 7, 2024.
- Godfrey, Elaine (October 9, 2024). "November will be worse: Hurricane disinformation was just the start". The Atlantic. Archived from the original on October 9, 2024.
- Harvey, Chelsea (October 11, 2024). "All the ways Hurricane Milton made history". Scientific American. Climatewire. Archived from the original on November 6, 2024.
- Hennessy-Fiske, Molly; Joselow, Maxine; Morse, Clara Ence; Oremus, Will (October 4, 2024). "FEMA deploys to rough terrain after Helene as it faces criticism, fights misinformation". The Washington Post. Archived from the original on October 4, 2024.
- Hsu, Tiffany; Thompson, Stuart A. (October 10, 2024). "Bizarre falsehoods about Hurricanes Helene and Milton disrupt recovery efforts". The New York Times. Archived from the original on October 14, 2024.
- Hudnall, Hannah (October 3, 2024). "Image of Donald Trump wading through flood water is AI-generated". Fact check. USA Today. Archived from the original on October 4, 2024.
- Jingnan, Huo (October 9, 2024). "How FEMA tries to combat rumors and conspiracy theories about Milton and Helene". WUSF. Archived from the original on October 10, 2024.
- Joselow, Maxine; Oremus, Will; De Vynck, Gerrit; Berman, Mark (October 5, 2024). "Helene response hampered by misinformation, conspiracy theories". The Washington Post. Archived from the original on October 5, 2024.
- Kayyem, Juliette (October 5, 2024). "The fog of disaster is getting worse". The Atlantic. Archived from the original on October 7, 2024.
- Kayyem, Juliette (October 7, 2024). "Helene recovery complicated by lies, hoaxes and conspiracy theories". News Hour (Interview). Interviewed by Geoff Bennett. PBS. Archived from the original on October 8, 2024.
- Kelly, Stephanie (October 6, 2024). "US officials struggle to quash Hurricane Helene conspiracy theories". Reuters.
- Kiehl, Allison (October 9, 2024). "Image showing Gatlinburg flooded debunked: Why the widely circulated image is not real". Knoxville News Sentinel. Archived from the original on October 10, 2024.
- Koren, Marina (October 9, 2024). "Hurricane Milton made a terrible prediction come true". The Atlantic. Archived from the original on October 10, 2024.
- Leingang, Rachel (October 4, 2024). "Hurricane Helene conspiracy theories collide with election misinformation". The Guardian. Archived from the original on October 4, 2024.
- Leingang, Rachel (October 11, 2024). "Hurricane misinformation signals how US election lies could intensify". The Guardian. Archived from the original on November 12, 2024.
- Lowry, Michael (October 11, 2024). "Checking back on the state of the 2024 Atlantic hurricane season". WPLG. Archived from the original on November 6, 2024.
- Makuch, Ben (October 10, 2024). "Russia shares AI images of Hurricane Milton as disinformation abounds in US". The Guardian. Archived from the original on November 6, 2024.
- Masters, Jeff; Henson, Bob (October 2, 2024). "Helene is now the deadliest mainland U.S. hurricane since Katrina". Yale Climate Connections. Yale University. Archived from the original on October 2, 2024.
- McCarthy, Bill (October 10, 2024). "Clips in widespread tornado compilation video predate Hurricane Milton". AFP Fact Check. Agence France-Presse. Archived from the original on November 6, 2024.
- Medina, Eduardo (October 8, 2024). "Antisemitism and threats directed at officials over storm response". The New York Times. Archived from the original on October 9, 2024.
- Oremus, Will; Joselow, Maxine (October 8, 2024). "Officials face antisemitic attacks over Hurricane Helene response". The Washington Post. Archived from the original on October 8, 2024.
- O'Sullivan, Donie (October 10, 2024). "Amid hurricanes, the chemtrail conspiracy theory has its moment in the sun". CNN. Archived from the original on November 9, 2024.
- Owen, Tess (October 8, 2024). "Right-wing influencers claim 'they' defeated physics, geoengineered Hurricane Milton". Wired. Archived from the original on October 8, 2024.
- Puzzanghera, Jim (October 10, 2024). "GOP seizes on hurricane misinformation, seeking edge in battleground Georgia". The Boston Globe. Archived from the original on November 6, 2024.
- Raby, John; Angueira, Gabriella Aoun (October 7, 2024). "FEMA administrator continues pushback against false claims as Helene death toll hits 230". Associated Press. Archived from the original on October 7, 2024.
- Rodriguez, Sabrina; McDaniel, Justine (October 4, 2024). "As Trump makes false claims about hurricane relief, White House calls it 'poison'". The Washington Post. Archived from the original on October 4, 2024.
- Sacks, Brianna; Lamothe, Dan (October 14, 2024). "North Carolina authorities arrest armed man after threats against FEMA workers". The Washington Post. Archived from the original on November 6, 2024.
- Selig, Kate (October 14, 2024). "Meteorologists face harassment and death threats amid hurricane disinformation". The New York Times. Archived from the original on November 6, 2024.
- Shalal, Andrea (October 28, 2024). "Russian, Chinese and Cuban accounts are amplifying hurricane misinformation, US official says". Reuters.
- Sommer, Lauren (October 2, 2024). "Hurricanes are dangerous far from the coast. Communities are struggling to prepare". NPR. Archived from the original on October 2, 2024.
- Strickler, Laura; Alexander, Peter; Guilfoil, Kyla (October 4, 2024). "False claims about FEMA disaster funds and migrants pushed by Trump". NBC News. Archived from the original on October 4, 2024.
- Thalen, Mikael (October 8, 2024). "Verified X accounts spread tales of U.S. Marines killing FEMA officials in wake of Helene". Daily Dot. Archived from the original on October 8, 2024.
- "Russian state media uses AI-generated images of Florida's Disney World flooded by Milton". VOA News. October 11, 2024. Archived from the original on November 6, 2024.
- Wade, Natalie (October 1, 2024). "Posts falsely blame HAARP research project for Hurricane Helene". AFP Fact Check. Agence France-Presse. Archived from the original on October 2, 2024.
- Warzel, Charlie (October 10, 2024). "I'm running out of ways to explain how bad this is". The Atlantic. Archived from the original on November 4, 2024.
- Whitehead, Jamie (November 9, 2024). "Fema official ordered storm crews not to help Trump voters". BBC News. Archived from the original on November 11, 2024.

=== Web sources ===
- Burns, Darrik, ed. (October 4, 2024). "HAARP and NEXRAD cannot create or modify weather events, including storms such as Hurricane Helene". Science Feedback. Archived from the original on October 10, 2024.
- Dumé, Isabelle, ed. (March 2, 2021). "The scientific research facility HAARP cannot create natural disasters or influence human thoughts and movements, contrary to online claims". Science Feedback. Archived from the original on February 23, 2024.
- Fournier, Elle (May 24, 2017). "HAARP research attracts conspiracies, misunderstandings". UAF News. University of Alaska Fairbanks. Archived from the original on October 23, 2022.
- "Hurricane Helene brews up storm of online falsehoods and threats". Digital Dispatches. Institute for Strategic Dialogue. October 8, 2024. Archived from the original on October 8, 2024.
- Paciorek, Elijah; Sartori, Nico; Schaaf, Bailey; Sweeney, Kaylee; Zinnbauer, James (2024). "2024 Atlantic Hurricane Season". Scalia Laboratory. Ohio University. Archived from the original on November 21, 2024.
- Pascone, Anthony (October 8, 2024). "Fact check: Did the North Carolina State Police issue a statement threatening the arrest of FEMA employees?". Check Your Fact. Archived from the original on October 8, 2024.
- "Alex Jones". Extremist Files. Southern Poverty Law Center. Archived from the original on December 13, 2024.

=== Primary sources ===
- Criswell, Deanne (October 7, 2024). "As Florida braces for Milton's impact, FEMA chief says hurricane aid isn't political". Morning Edition (Interview). Interviewed by Steve Inskeep. NPR. Archived from the original on October 9, 2024.
- Criswell, Deanne (November 9, 2024). "Statement from FEMA Administrator Deanne Criswell on Employee Misconduct" (Press release). Archived from the original on November 10, 2024.
- Edwards, Chuck (October 8, 2024). "Debunking Helene Response Myths" (Press release). Archived from the original on October 8, 2024.
- Greene, Marjorie Taylor [@mtgreenee] (October 3, 2024). "Yes they can control the weather. It's ridiculous for anyone to lie and say it can't be done" (Tweet) – via X (formerly Twitter).
- LaBolt, Ben (October 8, 2024). "Interested Parties Memo: Fighting Hurricane Helene Falsehoods with Facts" (Press release). White House.
- "Highly active hurricane season likely to continue in the Atlantic" (Press release). National Oceanic and Atmospheric Administration. August 8, 2024. Archived from the original on August 8, 2024.
- "Atlantic hurricane season races to finish within range of predicted number of named storms" (Press release). National Oceanic and Atmospheric Administration. November 25, 2024. Archived from the original on November 26, 2024.
- Rajalakshmi, Niranjana (April 29, 2024). "Brace for a very active hurricane season this year, warn UArizona forecasters" (Press release). University of Arizona. Archived from the original on May 1, 2024.
- Thiem, Haley (October 8, 2024). "Hurricane Milton rapidly intensifies into Category 5 hurricane, becoming the Gulf's strongest late-season storm on record". Climate.gov. National Oceanic and Atmospheric Administration. Archived from the original on November 6, 2024.
- Thiem, Haley; Lindsey, Rebecca (November 7, 2024). Cordeira, Jay; Vecchi, Gabriel (eds.). "Hurricane Helene's extreme rainfall and catastrophic inland flooding". Climate.gov. National Oceanic and Atmospheric Administration. Archived from the original on November 9, 2024.
