= Rachel Davidson =

US civil engineer and professor

Rachel A. Davidson
- Education: Ph.D: Stanford University, Master: Stanford University, Bachelor: Princeton University
- Engineering career
- Discipline: Risk analyst and civil engineer
- Institutions: Disaster Research Center
- Awards: Best paper award (Society for Risk Analysis, Risk Analysis journal, 2007)

Rachel A. Davidson is an American civil engineer and professor in the Disaster Research Center at the University of Delaware. She is known for her research on natural disaster risk modeling, disaster risk management and civil infrastructure systems. She is a winner of the Dorothy Swanson Excellence in Teaching Award and a nominee for the Walter L. Huber Civil Engineering Research Prize. She was the president of Society for Risk Analysis (2010-2011).

== See also ==
- Fire safety
