= M. Granger Morgan =

American academic

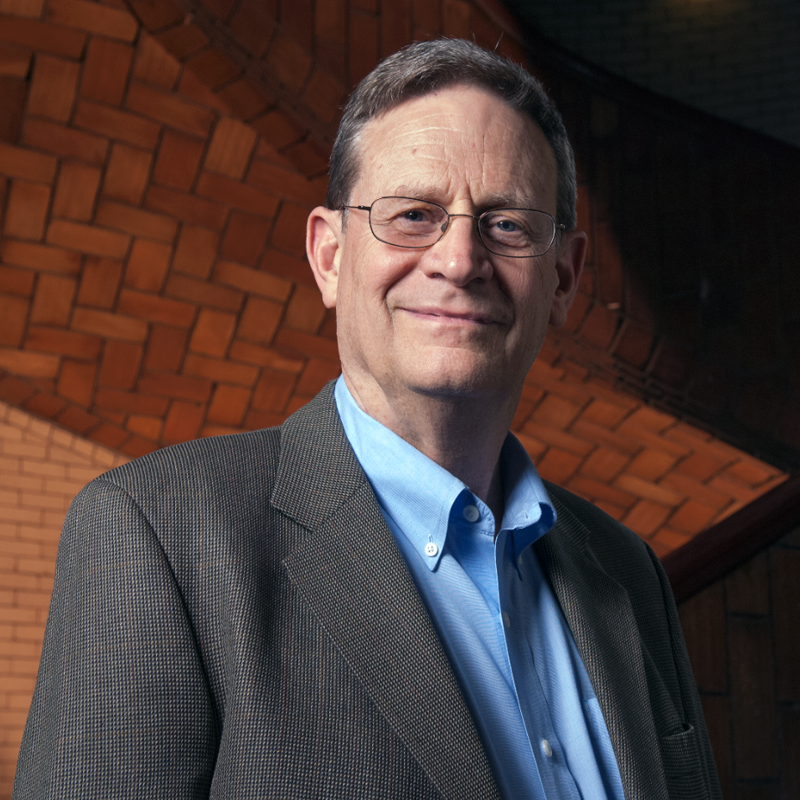
- Born: March 17, 1941 (age 85); Hanover, New Hampshire, USA
- Known for: Education and research in the area of engineering and public policy; introducing the treatment of uncertainty to quantitative policy analysis; work in risk analysis and risk communication; interdisciplinary education and research in climate and energy decision making.

Academic background
- Education: Harvard, AB 1963; Cornell, MS 1965; UC San Diego, PhD 1969
- Doctoral advisor: Kenneth L. Bowles
- Website: Carnegie Mellon

Millett Granger Morgan (born March 17, 1941) is an American scientist, academic, and engineer who is the Hamerschlag University Professor of Engineering at Carnegie Mellon University. Over his career, Morgan has led the development of the area of engineering and public policy.

== Education and early career ==
While concentrating in physics at Harvard, Morgan became interested in a broad range of issues in history and social science, and spent the summer of his junior year doing data analysis at the Jicamarca Radio Observatory, outside of Lima, Peru, during which time he became deeply interested in issues of development in Latin America. After completing his MS in astronomy and space science at Cornell, where he did field work at the Arecibo Ionosphere Observatory, he moved to the University of California at Berkeley where he began a graduate program in Latin American history. Concluding that he wanted a career in the area of technology and policy, and to continue his technical education, he became one of the first two PhD students to join Henry Booker's newly established Department of Applied Electrophysics (now Electrical and Computer Engineering) at the University of California, San Diego. His UCSD thesis in applied physics and information science is titled A Laboratory Model for Radio Star Scintillation and Other Diffraction Phenomena. While completing the experimental work for his PhD, he arranged a course on computers and programming for a group of underserved high school students who the neighborhood youth corps placed on campus for the summer. After graduation, this experience led to his developing a program called Computer Jobs Through Training. Morgan also created an undergraduate course at UCSD in technology and public policy. In 1972 he moved to Washington to become a program officer in the National Science Foundation Office of Computer Research, building a new program on the social impacts of computing. While at NSF he also participated in work on energy. He left NSF in 1974 to continue work with Samuel Morris and others on energy issues at Brookhaven National Laboratory.

== Carnegie Mellon University ==
Morgan was appointed as an assistant professor at Carnegie Mellon University in Electrical Engineering and Engineering and Public Policy (EPP) in 1974, with the charge of coordinating the development of EPP's graduate program. He worked with Robert Dunlap and others to develop and obtain approval and funding for the PhD program in Engineering and Public Policy (EPP). EPP became an academic department in the engineering college at Carnegie Mellon University in 1976. Morgan became the founding Department Head and continued in that role through 2014, holding the position for 38 years. The program has now graduated over 400 PhDs, all of whom came to the department with a background in science or engineering and pursued research on problems in technology and policy in which the technical details were important.

Educated in applied physics, a field in which no result is published without a characterization of associated uncertainty, Morgan was dismayed to find that in the early 1970s this was not the norm in quantitative policy analysis. Through his work, initially on the health effects of coal-fired power plants and then on a variety of other topics in risk assessment, Morgan developed and demonstrated methods for characterizing and incorporating uncertainty in quantitative policy analysis. This work led to an extended collaboration with Max Henrion and the publication of the book Uncertainty: A guide to dealing with uncertainty in quantitative risk and policy analysis (Cambridge, 1990).

The 1980s saw growing concerns about improving risk communication. Working with economist Lester B. Lave and psychologist Baruch Fischhoff and a group of PhD students, they developed and demonstrated the mental model approach to risk communication. This work led to the publication of the book Risk Communication: A mental models approach (Cambridge 2002). Morgan, Lave, Fischhoff and their PhD students then went on to develop and demonstrate a variety of methods to support systematic risk ranking.

Beginning in the early 1990s, Morgan and his EPP and other colleagues, including Hadi Dowlatabadi, began to work on issues related to climate and energy decision making. They sequentially secured support for three distributed NSF centers. They created the first climate integrated assessment model (ICAM) that included a systematic treatment of parameter and model uncertainty; pioneered methods in scientifically substantive quantitative expert elicitation; and performed a wide range of studies that assessed the impacts of climate change, and the technologies and strategies that could be adopted to reduce emissions of greenhouse gases and mitigate impacts. Much of this work is summarized in the book Interdisciplinary Research on Climate and Energy Decision Making: 30 Years of Research on Global Change (Routledge, 2023).

In addition to his work on climate change, since 2001 Morgan collaborated, first with Lester Lave and more recently with Jay Apt, in organizing and operating the Carnegie Mellon Electricity Industry Center which has focused heavily on educating PhD students to work on issues related to electric power. Since 2008, Morgan has chaired three consensus studies for the U.S. National Academies related to electric power.

Throughout his tenure at Carnegie Mellon, Morgan has built on these and other research experiences to evolve a graduate core course in EPP, which is now supported by his book Theory and Practice in Policy Analysis: Including Applications in Science and Technology (Cambridge, 2017).

Morgan was elected to the U.S. National Academy of Science in 2007, and to the American Academy of Arts and Sciences in 2017. He is a Fellow of the American Association for the Advancement of Science (AAAS); the Institute for Electrical and Electronics Engineering (IEEE); and the Society for Risk Analysis (SRA).

== Personal life ==
Granger Morgan was born in Hanover, New Hampshire, to Eleanor Walbridge Morgan and Millet Morgan, a professor at Dartmouth College. Morgan has two children.

== Select publications ==
- M. Granger Morgan (ed.) (1976). Energy and Man: Technical and Social Aspects of Energy, IEEE Press, 536pp.
- M. Granger Morgan & Max Henrion with a chapter by Mitchel Small (1990). Uncertainty: A guide to dealing with uncertainty in quantitative risk and policy analysis. Cambridge University Press, 332pp.
- M. Granger Morgan, Baruch Fischhoff, Ann Bostrom and Cynthia J. Atman (2002) Risk Communication: A mental models approach. Cambridge University Press, 351pp.
- M. Granger Morgan and Jon Peha (2003). Science and Technology Advice to the Congress, RFF Press, Washington, DC, 236pp.
- M. Granger Morgan Sean T. McCoy with 15 others (2012). Carbon Capture and Sequestration: Removing the legal and regulatory barriers, RFF Press/Routledge, 274pp.
- M. Granger Morgan (2017). Theory and Practice in Policy Analysis: Including applications in science and technology, Cambridge University Press, 590pp.
- M. Granger Morgan with 13 others (2023). Interdisciplinary Research on Climate and Energy Decision Making: 30 years of research on global change, Routledge, 336pp.
