= Edward J. Balleisen =

American academic

- Education: Princeton University; Yale University
- Occupation: Historian
- Employer: George Washington University

Edward J. Balleisen is an American academic. For 30 years, he was a professor of history and vice provost of interdisciplinary studies at Duke University and the author or editor of several books. He is the provost of George Washington University.

== Early life ==
After growing up in Louisville, Kentucky, Edward Balleisen graduated from Princeton University, where he earned a Bachelor of Arts degree in 1987. He then earned an M.Phil. and a Ph.D. from Yale University in 1992 and 1995, respectively. From 1995 to 1997, he held a postdoctoral fellowship and teaching post at the University of the Witwatersrand in Johannesburg, South Africa. Balleisen has taught at Duke University since 1997.

== Career ==
A professor of history and public policy at Duke University, Balleisen has written two historical monographs, coedited two interdisciplinary books, and edited a three-volume interdisciplinary research collection. He is also Duke's vice provost for interdisciplinary studies.

According to David Rossell in the Journal of the Early Republic, in his first book, Navigating Failure: Bankruptcy and Commercial Society in Antebellum America, Balleisen "seeks to show how bankruptcy both sprang from and helped shape commerce during the antebellum period." Rossell added that the book "is worth reading if only for its fascinating description of business life in America from 1820 to 1860." In The Florida Historical Quarterly, Tony A. Freyer highlighted the "considerate detail" in Balleisen's analysis as well as his "richly textured narrative", which be characterized as "balanced." His second book, Fraud: An American History from Barnum to Madoff, published in 2017, focuses on the history of business fraud and policy responses to commercial deception in the United States. In the Chicago Review of Books, Dean Jobb called Fraud “an ambitious exploration of two centuries’ worth of swindles, bogus stock schemes and corporate crime” with “plenty of shady characters and ingenious fraudulent schemes” to engage readers.

Balleisen is coeditor of Policy Shock: Recalibrating Risk and Regulation after Oil Spills, Nuclear Accidents, and Financial Crises, published in 2017, which explores the ways in which industrialized democracies have reshaped their regulatory institutions following major crises.

He also coedited Government and Markets: Toward a New Theory of Regulation, published in 2010, with David Moss, in conjunction with The Tobin Project. This volume includes essays from leading social scientists about the role of effective regulatory policy in constituting markets and reducing socioeconomic harms associated with modern capitalism. Balleisen directed the Rethinking Regulation program at Duke's Kenan Institute for Ethics from 2010 to 2015. While director, he produced Business Regulation, a three-volume work composed of influential writings on regulatory policy since 1870.

As Duke's vice provost for interdisciplinary studies, Balleisen oversees the Bass Connections program, as well as university-wide institutes and initiatives that foster collaborative research, teaching, and outreach.

He is the lead Principal Investigator on the Versatile Humanists at Duke project, funded by a Next Generation PhD implementation grant from the National Endowment for the Humanities.

According to Colleen Flaherty of Inside Higher Ed, Balleisen has observed that collaborative research “leads to excellence, whether one envisages research within the academy or research outside of it, whether it’s teaching or whether it’s civic engagement, again, from the academic perch or outside of it."

== Works ==
- Balleisen, Edward J. (2001). Navigating Failure: Bankruptcy and Commercial Society in Antebellum America. Chapel Hill, North Carolina: University of North Carolina Press. ISBN 9780807826003. OCLC 923717049.
- Balleisen, Edward J.; Moss, David A., eds. (2009). Government and Markets : Toward a New Theory of Regulation. Cambridge, U.K.: Cambridge University Press. ISBN 9780521118484. OCLC 876234535.
- Ballseisen, Edward J., ed. (2015). Business Regulation. Cheltenham, U.K.: Edward Elgar Publishing. ISBN 9781784713041. OCLC 969929535.
- Balleisen, Edward J. (2017). Fraud: An American History from Barnum to Madoff. Princeton, New Jersey: Princeton University Press. ISBN 9780691164557. OCLC 976430883.
- Balleisen, Edward J.; Bennear, Lori S.; Krawiec, Kimberly D.; Wiener, Jonathan B.; eds. (2017). Policy Shock: Recalibrating Risk and Regulation after Oil Spills, Nuclear Accidents and Financial Crises. Cambridge, U.K.: Cambridge University Press. ISBN 9781107140219
