= Ali Mosleh (engineer) =

American engineer and researcher in risk and reliability sciences

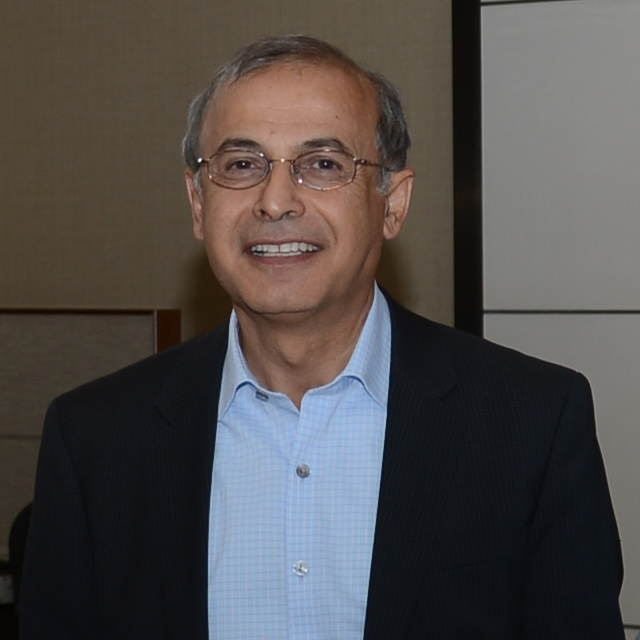
- Mosleh in 2024
- Born: July 1, 1952; Tehran, Iran
- Education: Sharif University of Technology (B.Sc.); University of California, Los Angeles (M.S., Ph.D.)
- Known for: Probabilistic risk assessment (PRA); Bayesian reliability modeling Common cause failure analysis Human reliability and socio-technical risk
- Title: Distinguished Professor and Evalyn Knight Chair in Engineering, UCLA
- Awards: Member of the National Academy of Engineering (2010); Fellow of the Society for Risk Analysis (1999); Fellow of the American Nuclear Society (2013); NASA Flight Safety Award (1998); Evans–McElroy Award (2009)
- Scientific career
- Fields: Reliability engineering Probabilistic risk assessment Systems engineering Bayesian modeling
- Workplaces: University of California, Los Angeles; University of Maryland, College Park
- Doctoral advisor: George E. Apostolakis

Ali Mosleh is an American engineer, researcher, and educator recognized for his contributions to probabilistic risk assessment (PRA), system reliability, and risk-informed decision making. He is Distinguished Professor and Evalyn Knight Chair in Engineering at the UCLA Samueli School of Engineering and the founding Director of the B. John Garrick Institute for the Risk Sciences at the University of California, Los Angeles (UCLA).

== Early life and education ==
Mosleh was born in Tehran, Iran. He earned a Bachelor of Science in physics from Sharif University of Technology in 1975, and later moved to the United States to pursue graduate studies at the University of California, Los Angeles (UCLA), obtaining a Master of Science in Nuclear Science and Engineering in 1978 and a Ph.D. in 1981.

His doctoral research focused on the use of quantitative judgment in risk assessment following a Bayesian approach under the supervision of George Apostolakis.

== Academic career ==
Following completion of his doctorate, Mosleh was a senior consultant at PLG Inc. until 1988. Mosleh began his academic career at the University of Maryland, College Park, where he eventually reached the title of Nicole J. Kim Eminent Professor of Engineering in 1996 and served as the Director of the Center for Risk and Reliability starting in 2004. His research there established one of the leading academic centers dedicated to risk and reliability engineering.

In 2014, Mosleh returned to UCLA as Distinguished Professor and Evalyn Knight Chair in Engineering, with joint appointments in several departments including Materials Science and Engineering, Civil and Environmental Engineering, Mechanical and Aerospace Engineering, and Electrical and Computer Engineering. In 2015, he became the inaugural Director of the B. John Garrick Institute for the Risk Sciences, named in honor of fellow UCLA alumnus and pioneer B. John Garrick.

== Research ==
Mosleh’s research integrates reliability engineering, risk assessment, and decision science. His key contributions include:

- Development of simulation-based methods for reliability and PRA of complex engineered systems.
- Bayesian frameworks for system health monitoring, expert judgment, and causal modeling.
- Hybrid systems risk analysis encompassing hardware, software, and human–organizational interactions.
- Common cause failure modeling and uncertainty quantification in PRA of nuclear, aerospace, and infrastructure systems.
- Human reliability analysis and cognitive simulation of operator performance.
- Applications of PRA and reliability to healthcare, cyber-physical systems, and critical infrastructures.

He has authored or co-authored over 400 technical papers, reports, and book chapters in these fields.

== Honors and awards ==
Mosleh has received numerous recognitions for his work in reliability and risk sciences, including:

- Election to the National Academy of Engineering (2010) “for contributions to reliability engineering and probabilistic risk assessment.”
- Fellow of the Society for Risk Analysis (1999).
- Fellow of the American Nuclear Society (2013).
- NASA Flight Safety Award (1998).
- Evans–McElroy Award of the IEEE Reliability Society (2009).
- Tommy Thompson Award for Nuclear Safety (2013).

== Legacy ==
Mosleh is widely regarded as one of the leading figures in the evolution of probabilistic risk assessment, extending its methodologies beyond the nuclear domain to socio-technical systems, infrastructure resilience, and healthcare. His interdisciplinary work and institutional leadership have influenced modern safety and reliability education worldwide.

== See also ==
- George E. Apostolakis
- B. John Garrick
- Probabilistic risk assessment
- Reliability engineering
