= Ann Bostrom =

American policy analyst

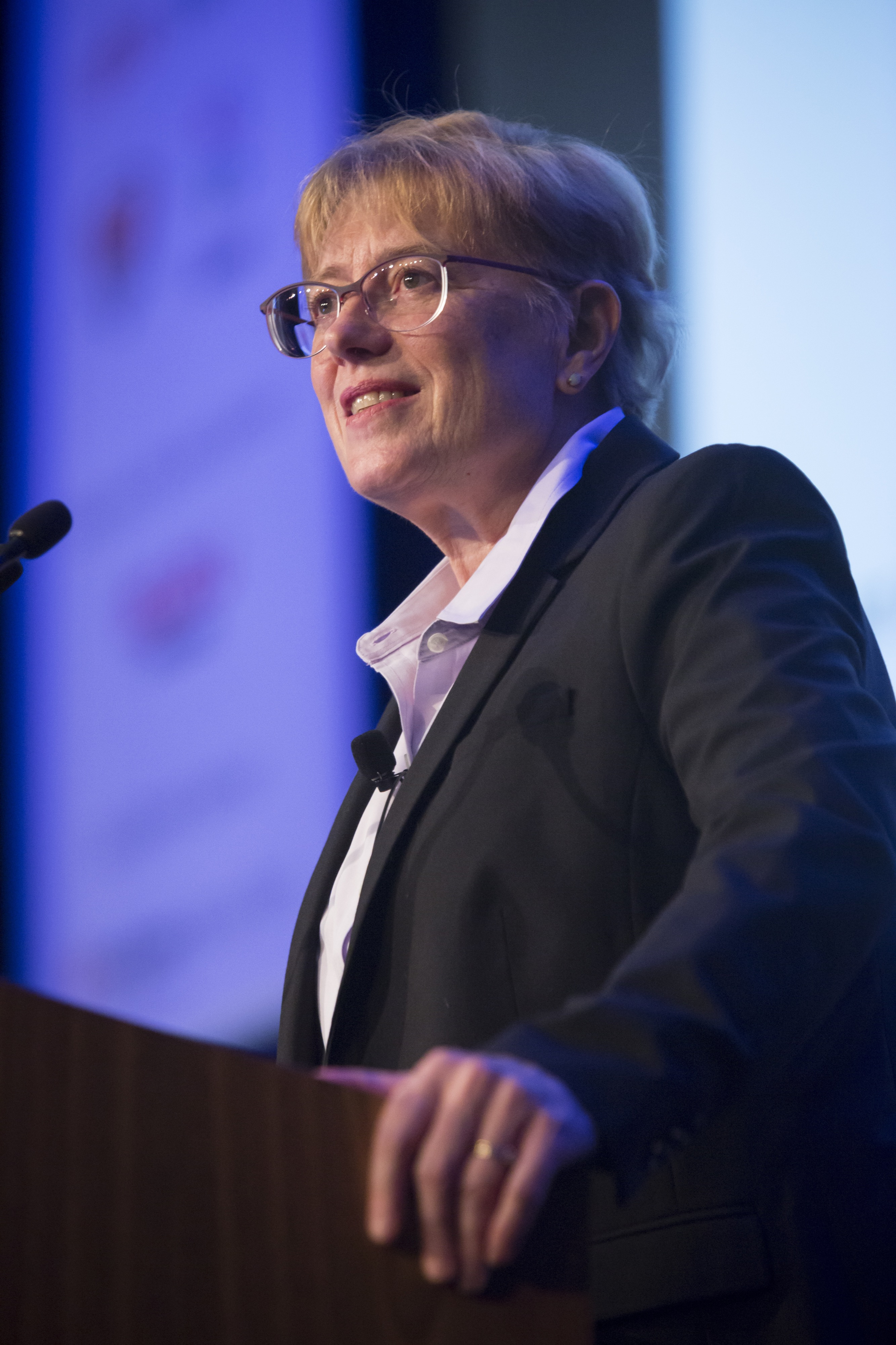
- Bostrom in 2017
- Education: Carnegie Mellon University; Western Washington University; University of Washington
- Scientific career
- Workplaces: University of Washington; Georgia Tech
- Thesis: Lifelong learning, intergenerational learning and social capital: from theory and practice (2003)
- Website: Official website

Ann Bostrom is an American policy analyst who is the Weyerhaeuser Endowed Professor in Environmental Policy at the University of Washington. Her research considers risk perception and management during uncertain times. She is a Fellow of the American Association for the Advancement of Science.

== Early life and education ==
Bostrom was an undergraduate student at the University of Washington, where she earned a bachelor's degree in English. She moved to Western Washington University for a master's degree in business administration. She then started doctoral research in public policy analysis at Carnegie Mellon University. She remained at Carnegie Mellon for a postdoctoral position, before moving to the Bureau of Labor Statistics in Washington, D.C.

== Research and career ==
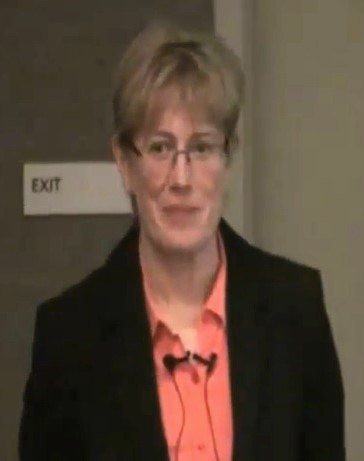
Bostrom in 2014

Bostrom joined the faculty at the Georgia Institute of Technology in 1992. She moved to the National Science Foundation in 1999, where she worked as Director of the Decision Risk and Management Science Program. At NSF, Bostrom was responsible for the Natural Disaster Reduction and the National Earthquake Hazard Reduction programs. Georgia Tech made Bostrom the Associate Dean for Research in 2004, and then a professor in 2007. In 2007, Bostrom moved to the University of Washington. Her research focuses on the communication and management of research. She has studied the risks associated with climate change.

Bostrom was appointed Chair of the American Association for the Advancement of Science (AAAS) Section on Social, Economic, and Political Sciences. She joined the board of the Association in 2019.

During the COVID-19 pandemic, Bostrom started researching how people evaluated risk of SARS-CoV-2.

== Awards and honors ==
- 1997 Chauncey Starr Award
- 2013 Elected Fellow of the American Association for the Advancement of Science
- 2014 Elected Fellow of the Washington State Academy of Sciences
- 2020 Society for Risk Analysis Distinguished Educator Award
- 2020 UW Population Health Initiative Award

== Selected publications ==
- M Granger Morgan; Fischhoff, Baruch; Ann Bostrom; Cynthia J Atman (2005). Risk Communication: A Mental Models Approach. ISBN 978-0-521-00256-1. LCCN 00067448. OCLC 45575495. OL 6796247M. Wikidata Q107335537.
- Kai M. A. Chan; Anne D. Guerry; Patricia Balvanera; et al. (2012). "Where are Cultural and Social in Ecosystem Services? A Framework for Constructive Engagement". BioScience. 62 (8): 744–756. doi:10.1525/bio.2012.62.8.7. Wikidata Q57049084.
- V T Covello (1995). "Risk perception and communication". Canadian Journal of Public Health. 86 (2): 78–82. PMID 7757896. Wikidata Q72255790.
