= International Society on Oxygen Transport to Tissue =

Medical research society

The International Society on Oxygen Transport to Tissue (ISOTT) is an interdisciplinary society of approximately 300 members that represents essentially every major tissue oxygen research laboratory in the world. Its purpose is to further the understanding of all aspects of the processes involved in the oxygen transport from the air to its ultimate consumption in the cells of the various organs of the body.

ISOTT was founded in April 1973 by Duane F. Bruley, Ph.D., P.E. and James Haim I. Bicher, M.D. They also served as the first co-presidents of the Clemson-Charleston founding meeting. At that meeting, Dr. Melvin H. Knisely served as the first honorary president of the society. The first elected president was Dr. Gerhard Thews. The Society has been the leading platform for the presentation of many of the technological and conceptual developments within the field both at the meetings themselves and in the proceedings of the society. These have been published by Plenum Publishers in 1973, then Kluwer Academic/Plenum Publishers, and then Kluwer Academic Publishers and lately by Springer in its Advances in Experimental Medicine and Biology series.

Examples of areas in which members have made highly significant contributions include electrode techniques, spectrophotometric methods, mathematical modeling of oxygen transport, the understanding of local regulation of oxygen supply to tissue and fluorocarbons/blood substitutes.

Since 1983 ISOTT has established awards to acknowledge outstanding young investigators. Among those are the Melvin H. Knisely Award, the Dietrich W. Lübbers Award, The Duane F. Bruley Awards, and The Britton Chance Award.
