= Rae Zimmerman =

American engineer

- Title: Research Professor and Professor Emerita of Planning and Public Administration Director of the Urban Planning Program ICIS Director

Academic background
- Education: University of California, Berkeley; University of Pennsylvania
- Alma mater: Columbia University

Academic work
- Discipline: Planning and Public Administration
- Institutions: New York University

Rae Zimmerman is an American risk analyst, teacher, and author. She currently teaches at New York University and is an Elected Fellow of the American Association for the Advancement of Science. Her work encompasses environmental management and planning, environmental health risk management, and urban infrastructure.

Since 1998, Zimmerman has served as the Director of the Institute for Civil Infrastructure. ICIS is a multi-university center that focuses on collaborative research, education, and community outreach on infrastructure services.

Zimmerman is the author of Transport, the Environment and Security, a book that connects the typically separate fields named in the title, drawing them together to provide collective solutions to respective issues faced by each field.

== Early life and education ==
Rae lived in Brooklyn as a child, and was interested in the arts, science, and geology. She attended the University of California, Berkeley in the 1960s and got a B.A. in chemistry, then earned a Master of City Planning from the University of Pennsylvania, and a Ph.D. in planning from Columbia University. Her doctoral work focused on industrial water pollution.

She taught graduate-level courses in risk management and the environmental movement in the 1970s, and received a grant from the National Science Foundation in 1980. She was president of the Society for Risk Analysis from 1996 to 1997, and received awards from it for "extraordinary achievement in risk analysis pertaining to the planning and operations of infrastructure systems"

== Career and impact ==
Zimmerman's work in urban planning is recognized for her contributions to understanding urban infrastructure and large technical systems. She co-edited Sustaining Urban Networks: The Social Diffusion of Large Technical Systems, which examines how complex urban systems spread and evolve in society. In Urban Infrastructure: Historical and Social Dimensions of an Interconnected World, Zimmerman explores the development and impact of interconnected urban systems on society. Her work highlights the importance of planning for sustainable and resilient infrastructure that shapes policy, environmental and technological planning.

Currently her work through the ICIS has focused on energy, transportation, water, communication and environmental protection. Projects from the ICIS have been funded by many United States agencies including the U.S. Environmental Protection Agency, the U.S. Department of Homeland Security, the National Science Foundation, the U.S. Department of Transportation, and the NYS Department of Transportation. These projects have included; unification of underground transport services; urban resilience to extreme weather events, including flooding, coastal storms, regional drought, extreme heat, and improving public transportation of impoverished population to improve natural disaster recovery; and evaluation of local environmental policy to improve community and environmental health.

== Publications ==
Zimmerman, Rae, Transport, the Environment and Security: Making the Connection. Edward Elgar Publishing, 2012

== Bibliography ==
- Governmental Management of Chemical Risk (1990)
- Transport, the Environment and Security (2012)
- Sustaining Urban Networks: The Social Diffusion of Large Technical Systems (co-editor, 2004)
