= Jonathan B. Wiener =

Professor

Jonathan B. Wiener is the William R. and Thomas L. Perkins Professor of Law at Duke Law School, Professor of Environmental Policy at the Nicholas School of the Environment, and Professor of Public Policy at the Sanford School of Public Policy, at Duke University. He is a leading scholar of regulation and risk analysis.

== Education ==
Wiener received his A.B. in economics from Harvard University in 1984 and his J.D. from Harvard Law School in 1987. He clerked for Judge (now U.S. Supreme Court Justice) Stephen G. Breyer on the U.S. Court of Appeals for the First Circuit in Boston in 1988–89, and for Chief Judge Jack B. Weinstein on the U.S. District Court in New York in 1987–88.

== Career ==
Wiener joined the faculty at Duke Law as an associate professor in 1994, was promoted to full professor in 1999, and was named to his current position as the William R. and Thomas L. Perkins Professor of Law in 2004. He has been a visiting professor at Harvard Law School, the University of Chicago Law School, and Sciences Po in Paris. In 2006, Wiener was the first law professor or lawyer to be elected president of the International Society for Risk Analysis; he served a one-year term in that post beginning December 2007. He is a University Fellow at Resources for the Future, an economics thinktank. He teaches courses on Property, Environmental Law, and Risk Regulation.

Wiener has written extensively on the subject of risk regulation. His books include The Reality of Precaution: Comparing Risk Regulation in the United States and Europe (RFF Press, 2011, with others) and Risk v. Risk (Harvard University Press, 1995) with John D. Graham, who would later go on to become the Administrator of the Office of Information and Regulatory Affairs under George W. Bush. Wiener was a chapter lead author for the Intergovernmental Panel on Climate Change (IPCC), 5th Assessment Report, Working Group III, Chapter 13, "International Cooperation: Agreements and Institutions" (2014).

== Selected writings ==
- The Reality of Precaution: Comparing Risk Regulation in the United States and Europe (2011) (ed. with others)
- Reconstructing Climate Policy: Beyond Kyoto ( 2003) (with Richard B. Stewart)
- Impact Assessment: Diffusion and Integration, in Comparative Law and Regulation 159-189 (Francesca Bignami & David Zaring eds., 2016) (with Daniel Lima Ribeiro)
- Responding to Agency Avoidance of OIRA, 37 Harvard Journal of Law & Public Policy 447-521 (2014) (with Nina Mendelson)
- Climate Change Policy, and Policy Change in China, 55 UCLA Law Review 1805-1826 (2008)
- Comparing Precaution in the United States and Europe, 5 Journal of Risk Research 317 (2002) (with Michael D. Rogers)
- On the Political Economy of Global Environmental Regulation, 87 Georgetown Law Journal 749 (1999)
