= Melvin H. Knisely =

American physiologist

Melvin Henry Knisely
- Born: June 17, 1904
- Died: March 30, 1975 (aged 70)
- Citizenship: American
- Scientific career
- Fields: Physiology
- Workplaces: University of Chicago, Medical College of South Carolina
- Academic advisors: August Krogh

Melvin Henry Knisely (17 June 1904 – 30 March 1975) was an American physiologist who first observed the pathological clumping of red and white cells, in vivo, at the capillary level. One of the most cited Knisely works was his research which documented the fact that even one alcoholic drink kills brain cells, which are irreplaceable.

Knisely was nominated for the Nobel Prize in Physiology from 1947 to 1949 and twice in 1951. From 1947 to 1949, Knisely was nominated for a Nobel Prize by his mentor August Krogh, the 1920 Nobel Laureate winner for physiology and medicine. Knisely's positions included a term as chairman of the Department of Anatomy at the Medical College of South Carolina (1948–1974).

In 1983 The International Society on Oxygen Transport to Tissue established the Melvin H. Knisely Award to honor Knisely’s accomplishments in the field of the transport of oxygen and other metabolites and anabolites in the human body.

Knisely was friends with John Steinbeck, and together they met with President Roosevelt during World War II to discuss a plan they had concocted to dump fake currency into enemy states. Knisely died in 1975.
