= Cynthia Atman =

American industrial engineer

Cynthia J. Atman is an American industrial engineer focusing on engineering education and human-centered design. She is Mitchell T. and Lella Blanche Bowie Endowed Chair in Human Centered Design & Engineering at the University of Washington.

== Education and career ==
Atman majored in industrial engineering at West Virginia University, graduating in 1979. She earned a master's degree in industrial and systems engineering at Ohio State University in 1983, and completed a PhD in engineering and public policy at Carnegie Mellon University in 1990. Her dissertation, Network Structures as a Foundation for Risk Communication: An Investigation of Structure and Format Differences, was supervised by Baruch Fischhoff.

After postdoctoral research supported by the American Association for the Advancement of Science at the United States Agency for International Development, working on engineering education in developing countries, she became an assistant professor at the University of Pittsburgh in 1991. After being promoted to associate professor, she moved to the University of Washington Department of Industrial Engineering in 1998, and became director of the Center for Engineering Learning & Teaching, which she continues to direct. In 2003, she was promoted to full professor and became director of the Center for the Advancement of Engineering Education; she remained its director until 2010. She was given the Mitchell T. and Lella Blanche Bowie Endowed Chair in 2006, and moved from Industrial Engineering to Human-Centered Design & Engineering in 2009. From 2014 to 2018 she co-directed the Consortium to Promote Reflection in Engineering Education.

== Recognition ==
Atman has won numerous best paper awards. She was the 2002 recipient of the Chester F. Carlson Award for Innovation in Engineering Education of the American Society for Engineering Education (ASEE), and the 2017 recipient of the Alfred N. Goldsmith Award for Outstanding Achievement in Engineering Communication of the IEEE Professional Communication Society.

She was elected as a Fellow of the American Association for the Advancement of Science in 2006. She is also a Fellow of the ASEE and was a distinguished speaker for the ASEE in 2024.

== Book ==
Atman is the coauthor, with M. Granger Morgan, Baruch Fischhoff, and Ann Bostrom, of the book Risk Communication: A Mental Models Approach (Cambridge University Press, 2002)
