= Roger Kasperson =

American risk analyst (1938–2021)

- Born: March 29, 1938
- Died: April 10, 2021 (aged 83)
- Education: University of Chicago; Clark University
- Known for: Risk Analysis; Risk Assessment; Risk perception Social Amplification and Attenuation of Risk
- Scientific career
- Fields: Risk, Geography
- Workplaces: Michigan State University; Clark University; University of Connecticut; National Academy of Sciences; American Academy of Arts and Sciences

Roger Kasperson (March 29, 1938 – April 10, 2021) was an American risk analyst, a distinguished academic and professor at Clark University and was one of the proponents of risk perception studies with his work on The Social Amplification/Attentuation of Risk Framework (SARF).

He was born in Worcester, Massachusetts. Honored by the Association of American Geographers for his research on hazards, he also served on various committees of the U.S. National Research Council (a.k.a., National Science Foundation) as well as the council of the Society for Risk Analysis and was given the 2006 Distinguished Achievement Award of the SRA. He was an elected member of the National Academy of Sciences and served as executive director for the Stockholm Environment Institute 2000–2004.

== See also ==
- Clark University
- Society for Risk Analysis
