= John Graham (policy analyst) =

American policy analyst, born 1956

John D. Graham
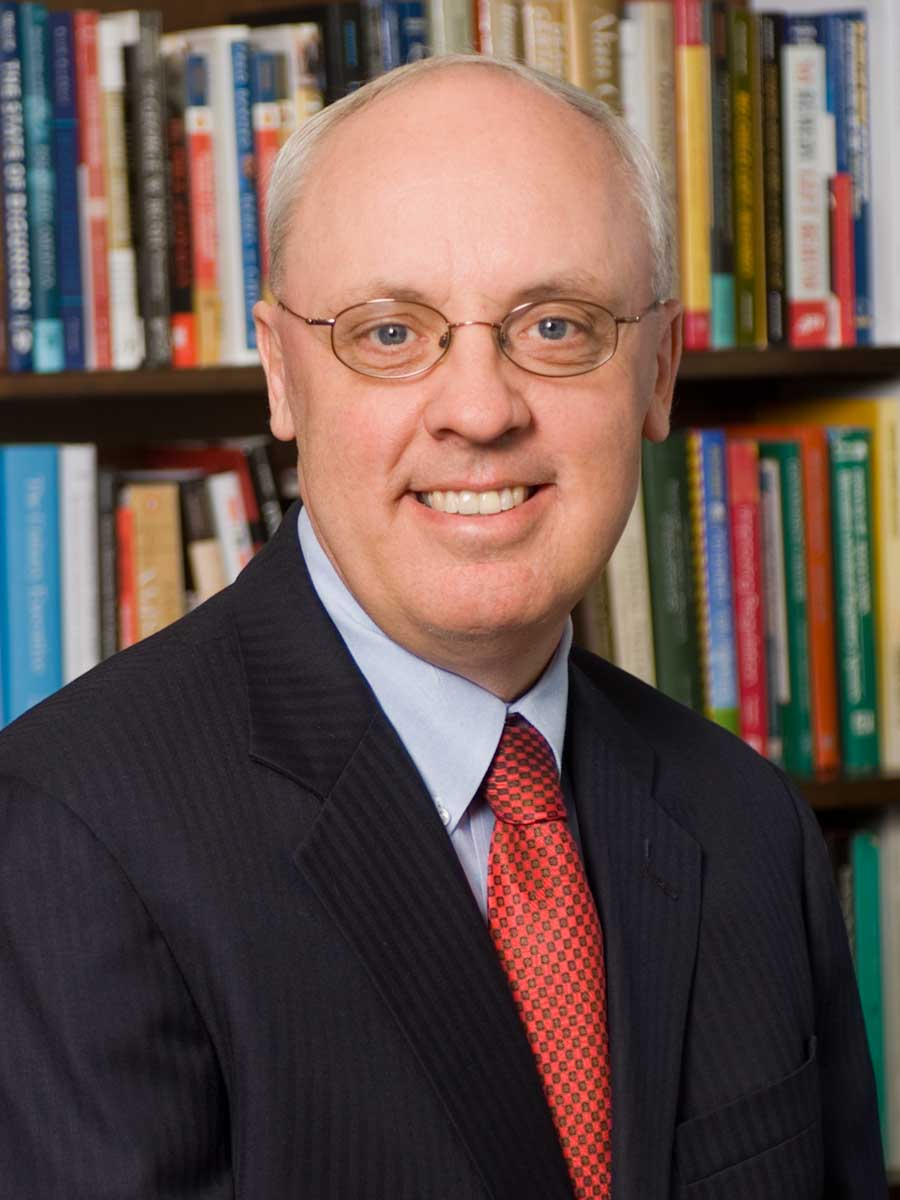
- John D. Graham, former dean of the Indiana University O'Neill School of Public and Environmental Affairs
- Born: 1956 (age 69–70); Pittsburgh, Pennsylvania
- Education: Wake Forest University (BA); Duke University (MPP); Carnegie Mellon University (PhD)
- Occupations: Professor, dean
- Employer: Indiana University
- Known for: Proponent of the use of cost benefit analysis in federal regulatory decision making.
- Spouse: Susan W. Graham
- Website: https://spea.indiana.edu/faculty-research/directory/profiles/faculty/full-time/graham-john.html

John D. Graham is a former senior official in the George W. Bush administration and the former dean of the Indiana University O'Neill School of Public and Environmental Affairs (formerly SPEA). Graham stepped down from the deanship to return to the O'Neill School faculty in the 2019 academic year.

== Early life and education ==
John D. Graham was born in 1956 as the son of an accomplished steel industry executive, and raised in Pittsburgh, Pennsylvania.

He earned his Bachelor of Arts in politics and economics at Wake Forest University in 1978, where he also won national awards as an intercollegiate debater. He earned his Master of Arts in public policy at Duke University in 1980 before serving as staff associate to Chairman Howard Raiffa's Committee on Risk and Decision Making of the National Research Council/National Academy of Sciences, (Washington, D.C.). He earned his doctorate in public policy at Carnegie Mellon University, and his doctoral dissertation on automobile safety, written at the Brookings Institution, was cited in pro-airbag decisions by the U.S. Supreme Court in 1983 and by Secretary of Transportation Elizabeth Dole in 1985.

Graham joined the Harvard School of Public Health as a post-doctoral fellow in 1983 and as an assistant professor in 1985. He taught methods of decision analysis and cost-benefit analysis to physicians, nurses, and other graduate students in public health. His prolific writings addressed both the analytic and institutional aspects of lifesaving policies. In 1991, at age 34, Graham earned tenure at Harvard.

== Career ==
From 1990 to 2001, Graham founded and led the Harvard Center for Risk Analysis (HCRA). By raising over $10 million in project grants and philanthropic contributions, Graham helped support eight new faculty positions and dozens of post-doctoral and doctoral students. By 2001, HCRA became internationally recognized for analytic contributions to environmental protection, injury prevention, and medical technology innovation.

In 1995, Graham was elected president of the Society for Risk Analysis (SRA), an international membership organization of 2,400 scientists and engineers. Graham reached out to risk analysts in Europe, China, Japan, and Australia as he helped organize the first World Congress on Risk Analysis in Brussels in 2000. In 2009, Graham received the SRA's Distinguished Lifetime Achievement Award, the society's highest award for excellence.

In 2013, Graham returned to Brussels, Belgium, to testify before the European Parliament Committee on International Trade about barriers to free trade. He has delivered invited testimony to numerous House and Senate Committees, state and federal agencies, and the European Commission and Parliament.

Graham is widely known to the public and to opinion leaders through his entertaining speeches about why Americans are both paranoid and neglectful of risks in their daily lives. In both formal and informal formats, he speaks frequently to groups of reporters, students, business leaders, and government officials. He has made several prime-time television appearances, including a Good Morning America interview on the safety of automobile airbags and a significant contribution to John Stossel's prime-time ABC special, Are We Scaring Ourselves to Death?

In March 2001, President George W. Bush nominated Graham to serve as administrator, Office of Information and Regulatory Affairs, Office of Management and Budget. He was confirmed by the Senate in July 2001. Located in the Executive Office of the President, this office of 50 career policy analysts oversees the regulatory, information, and statistical activities of the federal government. In this capacity, Graham worked to slash the growth of regulatory costs by 70 percent while encouraging regulations that save lives, prevent disease, and protect the environment.

From March 2006 to July 2008, Graham was dean of the Frederick S. Pardee RAND Graduate School (PRGS) at the RAND Corporation in Santa Monica, California. PRGS is the largest doctoral program in policy analysis in the world. Graham streamlined the core curriculum, established new analytic concentrations, revised program requirements to enable students to launch their dissertations more promptly, and raised funds from individuals and corporations to support scholarships, dissertation support, and policy papers co-authored by students and RAND researchers.

On July 28, 2008, Graham became the dean of a unique two-campus professional school, the Indiana University School of Public and Environmental Affairs (SPEA). Located in Bloomington and Indianapolis, Indiana, SPEA is one of the largest public affairs schools in the nation. During Graham's tenure, the school's enrollment grew to more than 2,000 undergraduate students, over 500 graduate students, and 80 doctoral students. The 85 full-time faculty members include laboratory scientists, social scientists, lawyers, and policy specialists.

Additionally, under Graham's deanship, SPEA's Master's in Public Affairs on the Bloomington campus rose to No. 1 out of 272 programs in the US in the 2016 U.S. News & World Report national survey. He helped raise more than $50 million in philanthropic support for the school and implemented a strategic planning process to guide the school, resulting in the publication of SPEA 2015 and SPEA 2020. During his tenure, student enrollment in overseas study programs tripled and the first fully online MPA program offered by a top graduate school in public affairs, SPEA Connect, was launched. In 2019, under his leadership, the school was named after Paul H. O'Neill, the former chairman of Alcoa Corporation and the former Secretary of the U.S. Department of the Treasury.

Graham is a longtime director of NSF International (Ann Arbor, Michigan) and an elected Fellow, National Academy of Public Administration (2009). Throughout his scholarly career, he has authored or co-authored more than 10 books and 200 articles for academic journals and national publications.

== Personal life ==
Graham is married to Susan Woerner Graham, a certified financial planner. They have two daughters, Jennifer and Katie, and three grandchildren. The Grahams share interests in duplicate bridge, golf, and ballroom dancing.
