= George E. Apostolakis =

American engineer and former NRC Commissioner

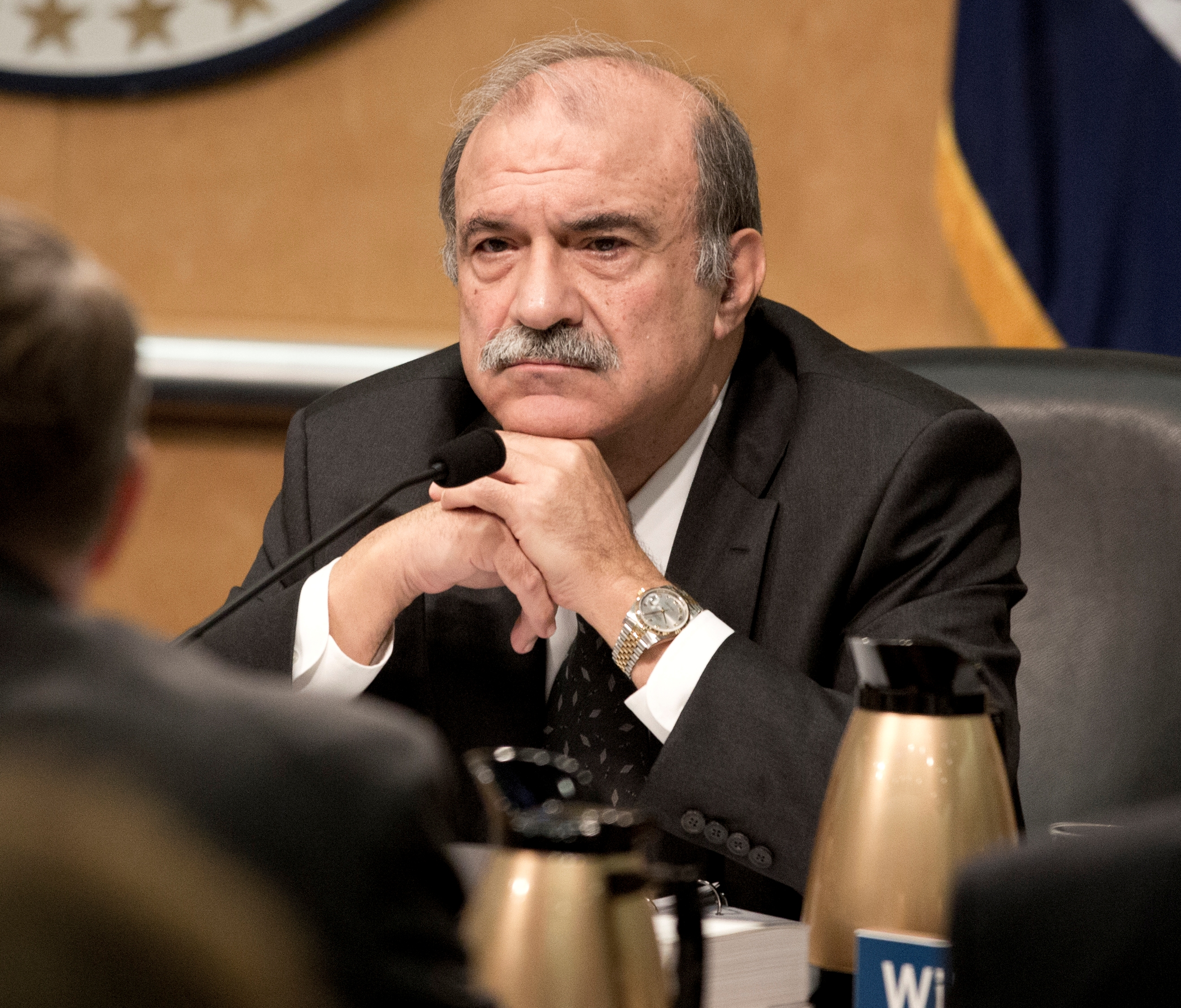
- George Apostolakis at a Commission Briefing
- Born: George E. Apostolakis; April 7, 1946; Crete, Greece
- Education: National Technical University of Athens (BS); California Institute of Technology (MS); California Institute of Technology (PhD)
- Known for: Probabilistic Risk Assessment
- Scientific career
- Fields: Nuclear Engineering, Risk Sciences
- Workplaces: Massachusetts Institute of Technology; U.S. Nuclear Regulatory Commission; Central Research Institute of Electric Power Industry
- Doctoral advisor: Noel Corngold
- Notable students: Ali Mosleh (engineer); Enrico Zio; Nathan Siu; Tsu-Mu Kao

George Apostolakis (born April 7, 1946) is an American engineer and scientist who has worked in the field of probabilistic risk assessment (PRA). He served as a commissioner of the U.S. Nuclear Regulatory Commission (NRC) from 2010 to 2014.

== Education ==
Apostolakis earned his Ph.D. from the California Institute of Technology. His doctoral research focused on studies in nuclear reactor dynamics, specifically on the accuracy of point kinetics and the effect of delayed neutrons on the spectrum of the group diffusion operator.

== Career ==
Apostolakis began his academic career at the University of California, Los Angeles in 1974 and later moved to the Massachusetts Institute of Technology in 1995, where he became a professor in the Department of Nuclear Science and Engineering. His research primarily focused on the development and application of PRA methodologies to enhance the safety of nuclear power plants.

In 2010, Apostolakis was appointed as a commissioner of the NRC by President Barack Obama. During his tenure, he contributed to the advancement of risk-informed and performance-based regulations to improve nuclear safety. He also played a role in the NRC's response to the Fukushima Daiichi nuclear disaster, advocating for enhanced safety measures and risk assessments.

After completing his term at the NRC, Apostolakis continued to work in the field of risk sciences through his involvement with various organizations and academic institutions. He has been associated with the Central Research Institute of Electric Power Industry (CRIEPI) in Japan, where he serves as the head of the Nuclear Risk Research Center.

== Research and Publications ==
Apostolakis has authored papers and reports on PRA and nuclear safety. One of his notable is the development of methodologies for integrating PRA into the regulatory framework for nuclear power plants.

== Awards and recognition ==
Apostolakis is a member of the National Academy of Engineering, an honor that recognizes his work in PRA and its application to nuclear safety.

== Legacy ==
Apostolakis's work has impacted the field of nuclear engineering and risk assessment, contributing to the development of modern safety protocols and regulatory practices.
