= James Haim I. Bicher =

American oncologist

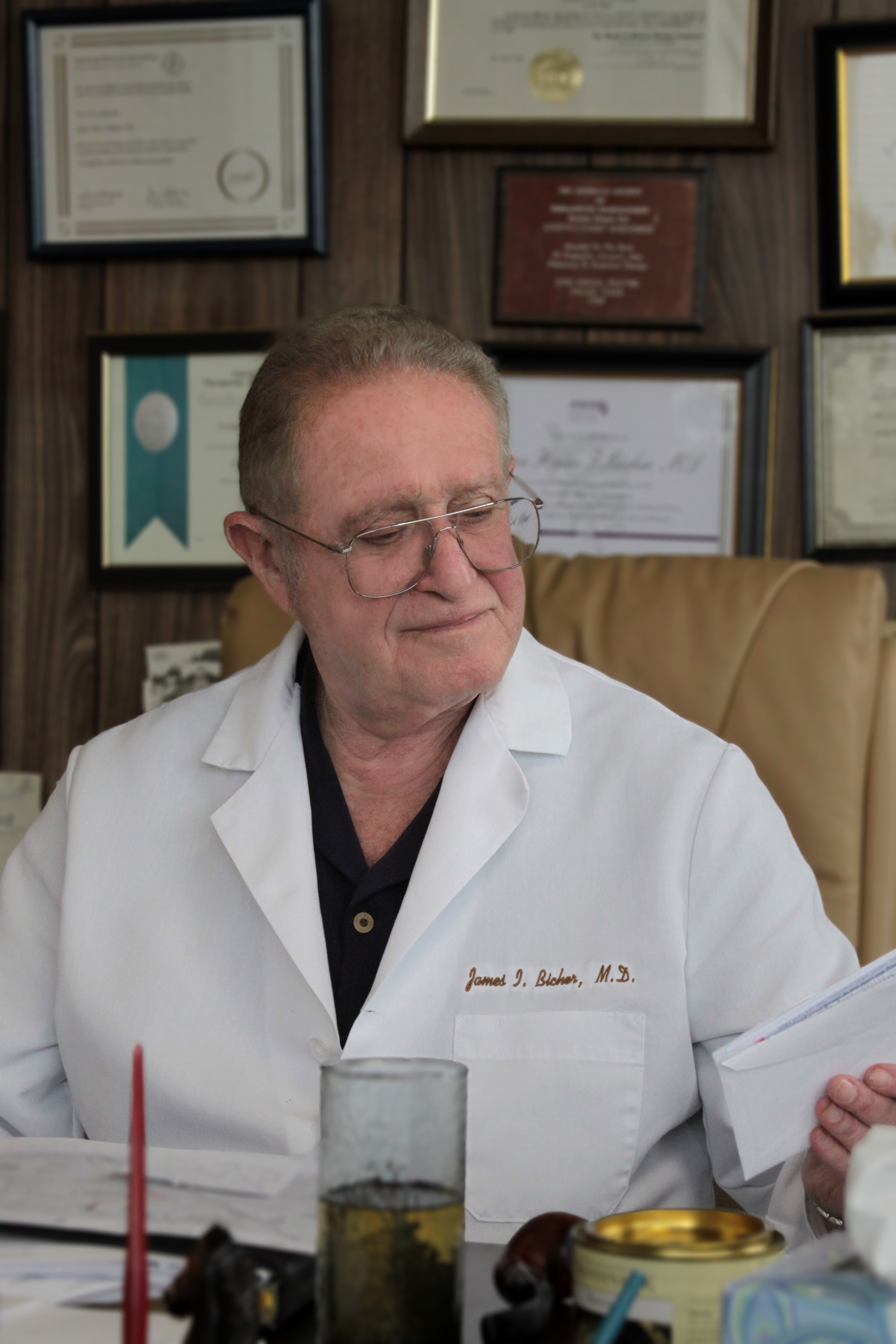
- Born: May 12, 1937 (age 89); San Cristóbal, Santa Fe, Argentina
- Died: June 12, 2024 (age 87); Fort Lauderdale, FL USA
- Medical career
- Profession: Radiation oncologist
- Sub-specialties: Hyperthermia

James Haim I. Bicher (born May 12, 1937) is an American radiation oncologist. He was born in San Cristóbal, Santa Fe, Argentina and is a researcher in the clinical use of hyperthermia combined with low dose (protracted) radiation therapy (thermoradiotherapy). He is a founder and past president of ISOTT, North American Hyperthermia Group, and the American Society of Clinical Hyperthermic Oncology. Bicher was a student of Bernardo Alberto Houssay, and one of the contributors to the basic principles that allowed later development of Plavix.

== Medical board discipline ==
The Medical Board of California has disciplined Bicher three times. In 1995, the Board placed him on probation for 18 months. In 2004, in response to new charges, Bicher was placed on five years' probation. In 2006, in response to a new accusation, Bicher admitted no wrongdoing but agreed to have his probationary period extended by two years. In 2009, an Administrative Law judge granted Bicher's requested to have his probationary period terminated early.
