= Risk Analysis (journal) =

- Discipline: Mathematics, applied sciences
- Language: English
- Edited by: Louis Anthony Cox

Publication details
- History: 1981–present
- Publisher: Wiley-Blackwell on behalf of the Society for Risk Analysis
- Frequency: Monthly
- Impact factor: 4.000 (2020)

Standard abbreviations
- ISO 4: Risk Anal.

Indexing
- CODEN: RIANDF
- ISSN: 0272-4332 (print); 1539-6924 (web)
- LCCN: 81643435
- OCLC no.: 53074515

Links
- Journal homepage; Online access; Online archive

Risk Analysis is a monthly peer-reviewed academic journal, covering all aspects of risk analysis, published by Wiley-Blackwell on behalf of the Society for Risk Analysis. The editor-in-chief is Louis Anthony Cox.

According to the Journal Citation Reports, the journal has a 2020 impact factor of 4.000, ranking it 8th out of 52 journals in the category "Social Sciences, Mathematical Methods", 15th of 108 journals in the category of "Mathematics, Interdisciplinary Applications", and 31st of 177 journals in "Public, Environmental & Occupational Health (Social Science)".
