= Baruch Fischhoff =

American academic (born 1946)

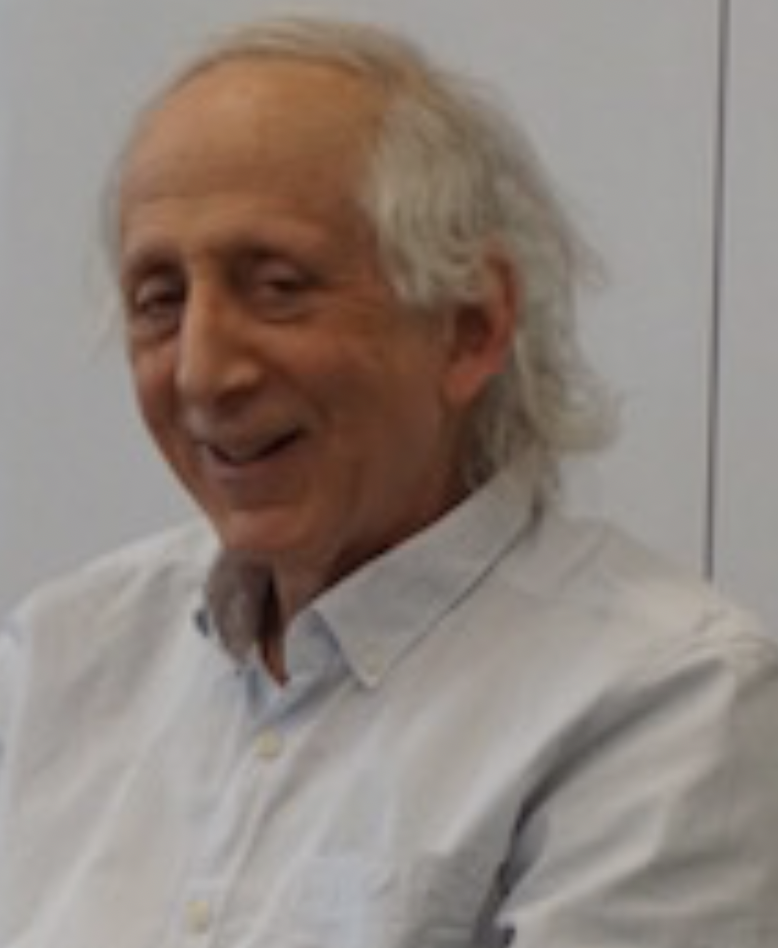
- Born: April 21, 1946; Detroit, Michigan, U.S.
- Education: The Hebrew University of Jerusalem; Wayne State University
- Known for: Judgment and decision making; Risk analysis; Communication sciences
- Scientific career
- Fields: Decision theory, risk
- Workplaces: Decision Research; Carnegie Mellon University; Stockholm University; National Academy of Sciences; National Academy of Medicine
- Doctoral students: Cynthia Atman; Shane Frederick; Donna Riley

Baruch Fischhoff (born April 21, 1946, Detroit, Michigan) is an American academic who is the Howard Heinz University Professor in the Carnegie Mellon Institute for Strategy and Technology and the Department of Engineering and Public Policy at Carnegie Mellon University. He is an elected member of the (US) National Academy of Sciences and National Academy of Medicine. His research focuses on judgment and decision making, including risk perception and risk analysis. He has authored numerous academic books and articles. Fischhoff completed his graduate education at the Hebrew University of Jerusalem under the supervision of Daniel Kahneman and Amos Tversky.

He has been honored with a 'Distinguished Achievement Award' by the Society for Risk Analysis, a Distinguished Scientific Award for an Early Career Contribution to Psychology by the American Psychological Association, an Andrew Carnegie Fellowship, the William Procter Prize for Scientific Achievement, and a Doctorate of Humanities, honoris causa, by Lund University. He has chaired committees of the U.S. Food and Drug Administration, the National Academy of Sciences, and the Environmental Protection Agency. He is a past president of the Society for Risk Analysis and Society for Judgment and Decision Making. He is a fellow of the American Psychological Association, Association for Psychological Science, Society of Experimental Psychologists, American Association for the Advancement of Science, and Society for Risk Analysis. He has received Carnegie Mellon University’s Ryan Award for Meritorious Teaching and College of Engineering Outstanding Mentoring Award.

His research includes work on hindsight bias, calibration of probability judgments (over/underconfidence), preference elicitation (and construction), adolescent decision making, individual differences in decision-making competence, climate and energy, risk analysis, expert judgment, pandemic disease, medicine, usability of AI, risk perception and communication, science communication, security, and interdisciplinary collaboration.

== Books ==
- Fischhoff, B. (2025). Bounded disciplines and unbounded problems (The Clarendon Lectures in Management). Oxford: Oxford University Press.
- Fischhoff, B. (in press). Decisions: Studying and supporting people making hard decisions. Cambridge, MA: MIT Press.
- Fischhoff, B., & Kadvany, J. (2011). Risk: A very short introduction. Oxford: Oxford University Press.
- Fischhoff, B., Lichtenstein, S., Slovic, P., Derby, S. L. & Keeney, R. L. (1981). Acceptable risk. New York: Cambridge University Press.
- Fischhoff, B., Kotovsky, K., Tuma, H. & Bielak, J. (eds.) (1993). A two-state solution in the Middle East: Prospects & possibilities. Pittsburgh: Carnegie Mellon University Press.
- Morgan, M.G., Fischhoff, B., Bostrom, A., & Atman, C. (2001). Risk communication: A mental models approach. New York: Cambridge University Press.
- Fischhoff, B., Brewer, N., & Downs, J.S. (eds.). (2011). Communicating risks and benefits: An evidence-based user’s guide. Washington, DC: Food and Drug Administration.
- Fischhoff, B., & Chauvin, C. (eds.). (2011). Intelligence analysis: Behavioral and social science foundations. Washington, DC: National Academy Press.
- Fischhoff, B., & Manski, C. (eds.). (1999). The elicitation of preferences. Journal of Risk and Uncertainty, 19(1-3).
- Seybolt, T., Aronson, J., & Fischhoff, B. (eds.). (2013). Counting civilian casualties: An introduction to recording and estimating nonmilitary deaths in conflict. Oxford: Oxford University Press.
- Fischhoff, B. (2011). Judgment and decision making. Oxford: Routledge/Earthscan.
- Fischhoff, B. (2011). Risk analysis and behavioral research. Oxford: Routledge/Earthscan.
