= Oak Ridge School of Reactor Technology =

College in Tennessee, United States

Oak Ridge School of Reactor Technology (ORSORT) was the successor of the school known locally as the Clinch College of Nuclear Knowledge, later shorten to Clinch College. ORSORT was authorized and financed by the U.S. government and founded in 1950 by Admiral Hyman G. Rickover and Alvin Weinberg. During its existence, the school was the only educational venue in the U.S. from where a comprehensive twelve-month education and training in either "Reactor Hazards Analysis" or "Reactor Operations" could be obtained, with accompanying certificates. Funding ended and the school was closed in 1965, shortly after authorization was extended to select U.S. universities to develop their own Nuclear Engineering curricula. Housed at the Oak Ridge National Laboratory, this venue and its instructors offered its students the highest level of education of practical applications of atomic energy available at the time, and first-hand exposure to a variety of nuclear reactor designs including the first graphite reactor, pool reactor, high temperature gas reactor, molten salt reactor, fast reactor and high flux reactor.

The school was made known first nationally and eventually worldwide to U.S. enterprises and to U.S. allies involved in the development of peaceful uses of atomic energy, and who were interested in educating and training designated scientific and engineering personnel at its unique venue. In 1959, ORSORT accepted its first international enrollments. Applications to enroll required strict clearance from the Atomic Energy Commission. Tuition fees partially offset school operating costs. Courses listed in their 1965 curricula included Analysis, Chemical Technology, Economics of Nuclear Power, Engineering Science, Experimental Physics, Nuclear Systems Laboratory, Hazards Study, Health Physics, Instrumentation and Controls, Materials, Mathematics, Meteorology, Physics, Reactor Operating Experience and Shielding. Scientific and engineering graduates of the one-year program earned certificates of completion and were awarded the degree of Doctor of Pile Engineering (D.O.P.E.). ORSORT turned out up to 100 graduates a year, many of whom became leaders in the nuclear industry, such as a former Secretary of Energy, James D. Watkins. The total number of ORSORT graduates was 976. In addition to 19 US students from the Atomic Energy Commission, the Oak Ridge National Laboratory and US utilities, the last graduating class of 1965 included engineering and scientific personnel sponsored by their governments in Australia, India, Israel, Japan, Netherlands, Pakistan, Philippines and South Africa.
