= Society for Risk Analysis =

- Abbreviation: SRA
- Formation: 1980
- Type: Learned society
- Legal status: Registered charity
- Purpose: Provide an open forum for all those who are interested in risk analysis and promote advancement of the state-of-the-art in research and education on risk analysis
- Headquarters: McLean, Virginia
- Coordinates: 51°30′32″N 0°8′22″W
- President (2025-2027): Benjamin D. Trump
- President (2024 - 2025): Jacqueline MacDonald Gibson
- Website: www.sra.org

The Society for Risk Analysis (SRA) is a learned society providing an open forum for anyone interested in risk analysis. SRA seeks to:

- Bring together individuals from diverse disciplines and from different countries and provide them opportunities to exchange information, ideas, and methodologies for risk analysis and risk problem solving;
- Foster understanding and professional collaboration among individuals and organizations for the purpose of contributing to risk analysis and risk problem solving;
- Facilitate the dissemination of knowledge about risk and risk methods and their applications;
- Encourage applications of risk analysis methods;
- Promote advancement of the state-of-the-art in research and education on risk analysis; and
- Provide services to its members to assist them in developing their careers in risk analysis.

== Publication ==
In early 1979, Robert B. Cumming, the first SRA President, recognized the growing need for risk researchers and practitioners to publish their work in a dedicated scientific journal. This led to the formation of an organization to support such a journal, with the certificate of incorporation for the SRA made official on August 28, 1980. The first issue of Risk Analysis appeared in March 1981.

== SRA interest areas ==
SRA broadly defines risk analysis to include risk assessment, risk characterization, risk communication, risk management, and policy relating to risk. The society's interests include: risk perception, risks to human health and the environment, both built and natural; threats from physical, chemical, and biological agents and from a variety of human activities as well as natural events; and risks of concern to individuals, to public and private sector organizations, and to society at various geographic scales. SRA published a glossary of definitions of key terms related to risk and fundamental principles for high quality risk analysis.

== Awards ==
SRA Awards recognize the value outstanding contributions to the field of risk analysis and the society. The following are its most-sought annual awards:

Distinguished Achievement Award. This award is given to any individual for his or her extraordinary achievement in science or public policy relevant to the field of risk analysis.

Richard J Burk Outstanding Service Award. A recognition to the society's member for extraordinary service to SRA.

Outstanding Practitioner Award. Award alternately given to a member in public and private practice for an outstanding practice in the field of risk analysis.

Chauncey Starr Distinguished Young Risk Analyst Award. For an outstanding risk-analysis-related achievement in science or public policy by a young SRA member (40 years of age or below) for exceptional promise and continued contributions to risk analysis.

Distinguished Educator Award. Awarded to an outstanding teacher, author, or mentor for substantial training of new experts in risk analysis.

== Presidents ==
SRA leadership includes the following risk analysis experts, who served as presidents (term):, with the term beginning at the SRA annual meeting in December.

- Benjamin D. Trump (2025–2027)
- Jacqueline MacDonald Gibson (2024–2025)
- Felicia Wu (2023–2024)
- Katherine von Stackelberg (2022–2023)
- Ragnar Löfstedt (2021–2022)
- Robyn Wilson (2020–2021)
- Seth Guikema (2019–2020)
- Katherine McComas (2018–2019)
- Terje Aven (2017–2018)
- Margaret MacDonnell (2016–2017)
- James Lambert (2015–2016)
- Pamela Williams (2014–2015)
- Ortwin Renn (2013–2014)
- George M. Gray (2012–2013)
- Ann Bostrom (2011–2012)
- Rachel Davidson (2010–2011)
- Richard Reiss (2009–2010)
- Aliston Cullen (2008–2009)
- Jonathan B. Wiener (2007–2008)
- Kimberly M. Thompson (2006–2007)
- Christopher Frey (2005–2006)
- Baruch Fischhoff (2004–2005)
- Caron Chess (2003–2004)
- Bernard Goldstein (2002–2003)
- Robin Cantor (2001–2002)
- John Ahearne (2000–2001)
- Roger E. Kasperson (1999–2000)
- Gail Charnley (1998–1999)
- Yacov Haimes (1997–1998)
- Rae Zimmerman (1996–1997)
- John Graham (1995–1996)
- Elisabeth Pate-Cornell (1994–1995)
- Robert G. Tardiff (1993–1994)
- James D. Wilson (1992–1993)
- D. Warner North (1991–1992)
- Curtis C. Travis (1990–1991)
- B. John Garrick (1989–1990)
- Richard C. Schwing (1988–1989)
- Vincent T. Covello (1987–1988)
- Paul F. Deisler Jr. (1986–1987)
- Lester B. Lave (1985–1986)
- Elizabeth L. Anderson (1984–1985)
- Paul Slovic (1983–1984)
- Chris G. Whipple (1982–1983)
- Robert B. Cumming (1981–1982)

== Specialty Groups ==
Many SRA functions are organized through its specialty groups, which cover a wide range of risk analysis topics.

- Advanced Materials and Technologies
- Applied Risk Management
- Decision Analysis and Risk
- Dose Response
- Ecological Risk Assessment
- Economic and Benefits Analysis
- Engineering and Infrastructure
- Exposure Assessment
- Foundational Issues in Risk Analysis
- Justice, Equity and Risk
- Microbial Risk Analysis
- Occupational Health and Safety
- Resilience Analysis
- Risk Communication
- Risk Policy and Law
- Security and Defense
