= Hamdard =

Hamdard is a surname. Notable people with the surname include:

- Juma Khan Hamdard, the current governor of Paktia Province, Afghanistan
- Sadhu Singh Hamdard, freedom fighter and journalist of Punjab, India
- Shakeeb Hamdard a singer of Afghanistan

== See also ==
- Hamdard India, pharmaceutical company in India
- Hamdard Pakistan, pharmaceutical company in Pakistan
- Hamdard Laboratories (Waqf) Bangladesh, pharmaceutical company in Bangladesh
- Hamdard Public School, a senior secondary school in New Delhi, India
- Hamdard College of Medicine & Dentistry, a college in Karachi, Pakistan
- Hamdard University, located in Karachi and Islamabad, Pakistan
- Hamdard University Bangladesh, located in Gazaria, Bangladesh
- Jamia Hamdard, university located in New Delhi, India
