= Rooh Afza =

Fruit drink in the Indian sub-continent

- Rooh Afza logo
- Type: Concentrated herbal, Squash (drink)
- Inventor: Hakim Hafiz Abdul Majeed
- Inception: 1906; 120 years ago
- Manufacturer: Hamdard India; Hamdard Laboratories (Waqf) Pakistan; Hamdard Laboratories (Waqf) Bangladesh
- Available: Indian subcontinent
- Slogan: Drink of the East

The front and back of a bottle of Rooh Afza.

Rooh Afza (Hindi: रूह अफ़ज़ा; Urdu: روح افزا; Bengali: রূহ আফজা; lit. 'Soul Refresher') is a drink which is a concentrated squash. It was formulated and introduced in 1906 in the Indian city of Ghaziabad by Hakim Hafiz Abdul Majeed. Currently, Rooh Afza is manufactured by the companies founded by him and his sons, including Hamdard India (the parent company), as well as Hamdard Laboratories (Waqf) Pakistan and Hamdard Laboratories (Waqf) Bangladesh. Since 1948, the company has been manufacturing the product in India, Pakistan and Bangladesh.

Other companies formulate the same un-patented recipe in these countries as well, and similar drinks are consumed in the Indian subcontinent during the summer, such as Khas Sharbat. The name and brand of Rooh Afza is a trademark of Hamdard, by court decision in 2023. The specific Unani recipe of Rooh Afza combines several ingredients (including thirteen herbs) popularly thought to be cooling agents, such as rose, which is used as a remedy for loo (the hot summer winds of the Indo-Gangetic Plain). The drink is also associated with the month of Ramadan, in which it is usually consumed during iftar. It is sold commercially as a syrup to flavour sherbets, cold milk drinks, ices, and cold desserts such as the popular falooda. The Hindi-Urdu name Rooh Afza is sometimes translated as "refresher of the soul". It is said that this name was made up by the original formulator of the drink, with possible cultural influences.

== History ==
Rooh Afza was founded by Hamdard's founder Hakim Hafiz Abdul Majeed in Ghaziabad, British India, and launched from the nearby city of Old Delhi. In 1906, he wanted to create a herbal mix that would help Delhi's people stay cool in the summer. He selected herbs and syrups from traditional Unani medicine and created a drink that would help counter heat strokes and prevent dehydration in people. An artist, Mirza Noor Ahmad, designed the labels of Rooh Afza in many colours in 1910. Progress in development and refining the original recipe continued all along until the final drink emerged.

After Majeed's death 15 years later, his wife Rabea Begum established a charitable trust in the name of herself and her two sons.

Following the partition of India in 1947, while the elder son, Hakim Abdul Hameed, stayed in independent India – the younger son, Hakim Mohammad Saeed, migrated to the newly created state of Pakistan on 9 January 1948 and started a separate Hamdard Company from two rooms in the Arambagh area of Karachi. Hamdard Pakistan finally became profitable in 1953. Hakim Mohammad Said had opened a branch of Hamdard in the former East Pakistan. According to Hakim Mohammad Said's daughter, Sadia Rashid, chairperson of Hamdard Pakistan in 2019, her father gifted the business to the people of Bangladesh after their independence from Pakistan in 1971.

In 2010, Indian chef Nita Mehta and Indian film actress Juhi Chawla were hired for promotional activities by Hamdard Laboratories to create new mocktail and dessert recipes for Rooh Afza, their all-season summer drink, which was used in a new marketing campaign.

Indian company Dabur produces Rooh Afza under the brand 'Sherbat-i-Azam'.

In 2018, the Pure Food Court of Bangladesh fined the company's Bangladeshi arm 400,000 taka (USD4870) for publishing misleading advertisements, specifically around the claim that the drink contains 35 different fruit juices.

== Ingredients ==
Its original formulation included:

- Herbs:
  - Deepak ("khurfa seeds", Portulaca oleracea)
  - Chicory
  - Wine-grape raisins (Vitis vinifera)
  - European white lily (Nymphaea alba)
  - Blue star water lily (Nymphaea nouchali)
  - Lotus (nelumbo)
  - Borage
  - coriander
  - Rosemary
- Fruits:
  - Orange
  - Citron
  - Pineapple
  - Apple
  - Berries
  - Strawberry
  - Raspberry
  - Loganberry
  - Blackberry
  - Cherry
  - Concord grapes
  - Blackcurrant
  - Watermelon
- Vegetables:
  - Spinach
  - Carrot
  - Mint
  - Sponge gourd (Luffa aegyptiaca)
- Flowers:
  - Rose
  - Kewra (Pandanus fascicularis)
  - Lemon
  - Orange
- Roots:
  - Vetiver (Chrysopogon zizanioides)

== Preparation ==
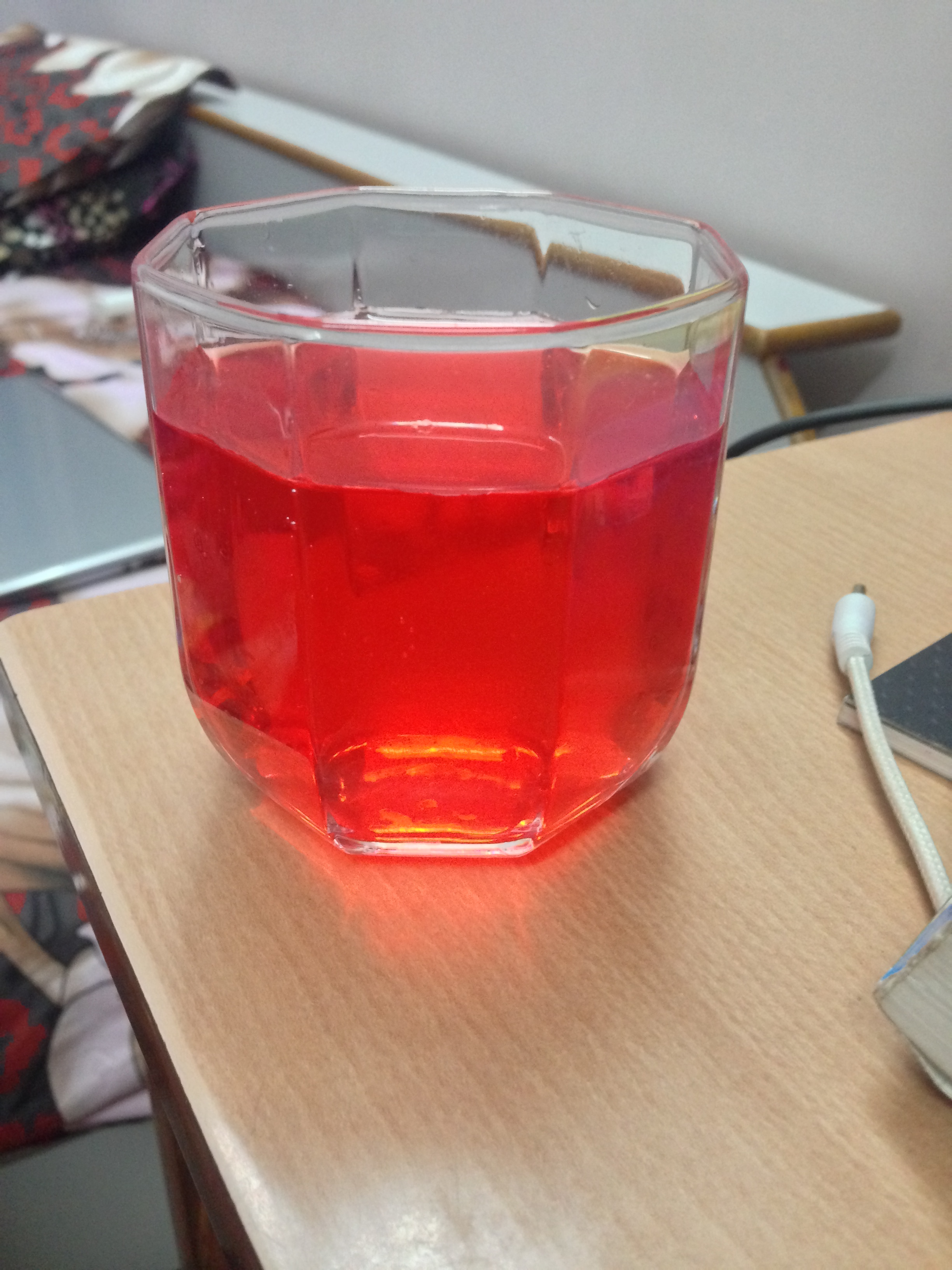
A sharbat drink made from Rooh Afza syrup.

Rooh Afza syrup is generally served mixed with cold milk or water and ice. Rooh Afza is often prepared as part of Iftar (the evening meal for breaking the fast or roza), during Ramadan. The concentrate can also be mixed with water, which is a common preparation in the hot South Asian summers. When mixed with water, the final drink is a type of sharbat. Rooh Afza syrup is often mixed with Kulfi ice cream and vermicelli to make a similar version of the popular Iranian dessert Faloodeh.

== Variants ==
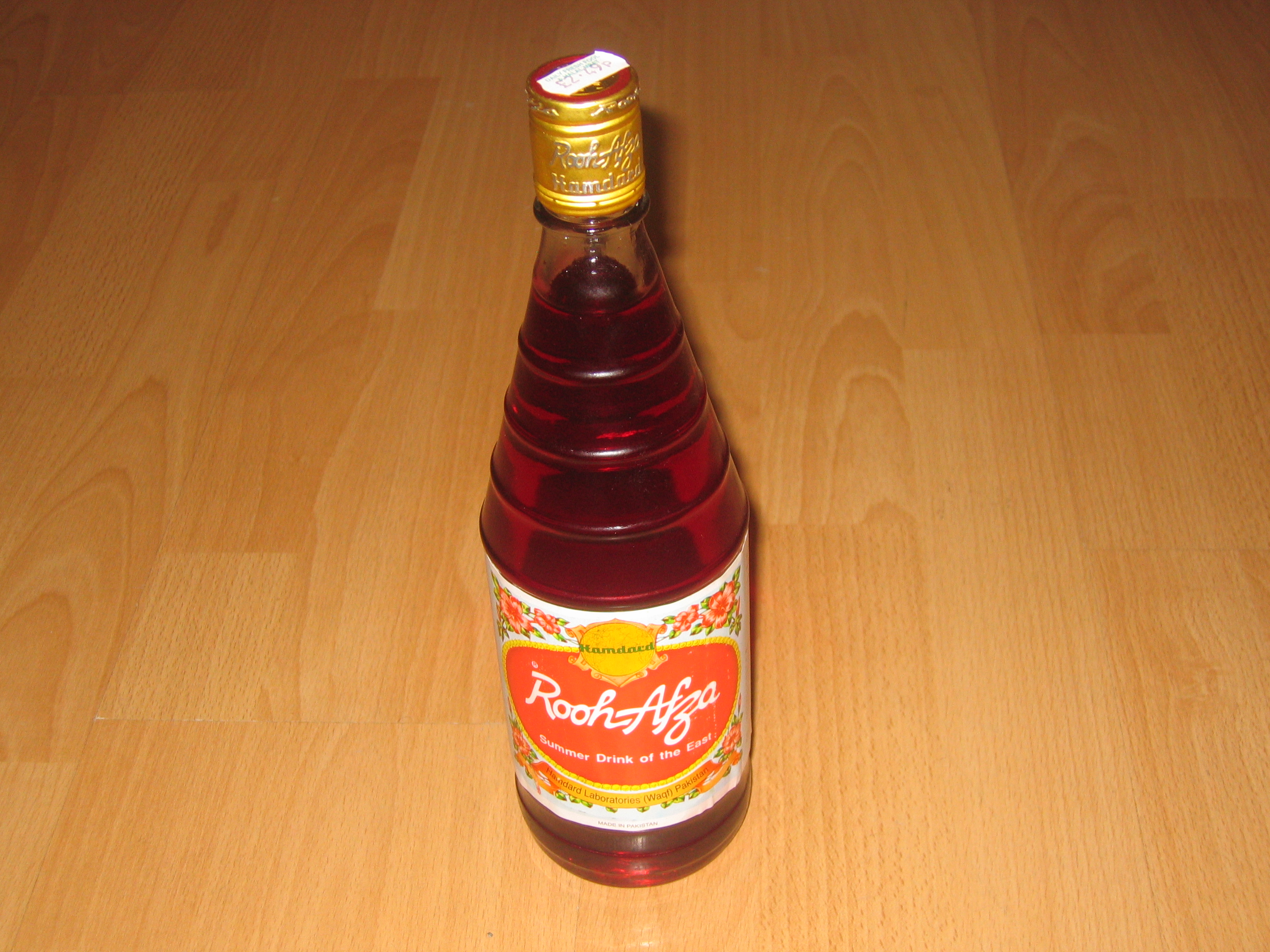
A bottle of Rooh Afza.

Hamdard Laboratories India has launched two ready to drink variants in India namely RoohAfza Fusion and RoohAfza Milkshake.

In Pakistan, one of the ready-to-drink variants, called the Rooh Afza Go, is available in a can form. In addition a drink commonly prepared by parents for kids in Pakistan, is now available as a product from Hamdard Laboratories (Waqf) Pakistan, called the Doodh (milk) Rooh Afza. It is essentially Rooh Afza flavored milk, packaged in a 225ml milk carton.

== See also ==
- List of Indian drinks
- List of soft drinks by country
