= Hamdard Laboratories =

Hamdard Laboratories may refer to:

- Hamdard India
- Hamdard Pakistan
- Hamdard Bangladesh
