= Hamdard Laboratories (Waqf) Bangladesh =

Herbal pharmaceutical company in Bangladesh

- হামদর্দ ল্যাবরেটরিজ (ওয়াকফ) বাংলাদেশ
- Predecessor: Hamdard Pakistan
- Formation: 1972; 54 years ago
- Headquarters: Dhaka, Bangladesh
- Region served: Bangladesh
- Official language: Bengali
- Managing Director: Hakim Md. Yousuf Harun Bhuiyan
- Website: hamdard.com.bd

Hamdard Laboratories (Waqf) Bangladesh is one of the largest herbal pharmaceutical companies in Bangladesh. It operates as a philanthropic waqf (endowment) in which all the company's profits go to a charitable foundation.

The company traces its origins to early 20th-century Old Delhi. Today, there are separate and independent companies bearing the Hamdard name in India and Pakistan. Their Rooh Afza is a popular drink, especially during Ramadan in South Asia. Hakim Md. Yousuf Harun Bhuiyan is the managing director and chief trustee.

== History ==
=== Predecessors ===
Hakeem Hafiz Abdul Majeed was an Unani (herbal medicine) practitioner and pharmacist. In 1906, he established a small Unani clinic called Hamdard in Old Delhi. "Ham" means "friend" and "dard" means "pain" in Persian, so the company's name means "companion of pain". Majeed wished to transform the company into a waqf (Islamic charitable endowment). He died in 1922 before he could do so, however, and it was left to the next generation to implement his plan.

His widow, Rabia Begum, and their elder son, Hakim Abdul Hameed, took over the management of Hamdard. His younger son, Hakeem Mohammad Said, joined the management of the firm after completing his studies. After the partition of India, Hameed continued to run operations in India. In January 1948, Said migrated to Pakistan. There he built a parallel company, also called Hamdard. It established a presence in East Pakistan in 1953. Within a few years, the company had sales offices in Dacca and Chittagong. East Pakistan won independence as Bangladesh in 1971. Hamdard Pakistan's facilities there became the kernel of Hamdard Laboratories (Waqf) Bangladesh.

=== Independence ===
Hakim Md. Yousuf Harun Bhuiyan, who joined the company in 1972, became the managing director in 1982. In 1989, he established Hamdard Foundation Bangladesh. The company distributes all its profits through this charitable foundation.

The company began construction of a new factory in 2004 on nearly 33 acres (13 ha) in Meghna Ghat, Sonargaon Upazila, Narayanganj District. It was inaugurated in June 2005 by Minister of Health and Family Welfare Khandaker Mosharraf Hossain.

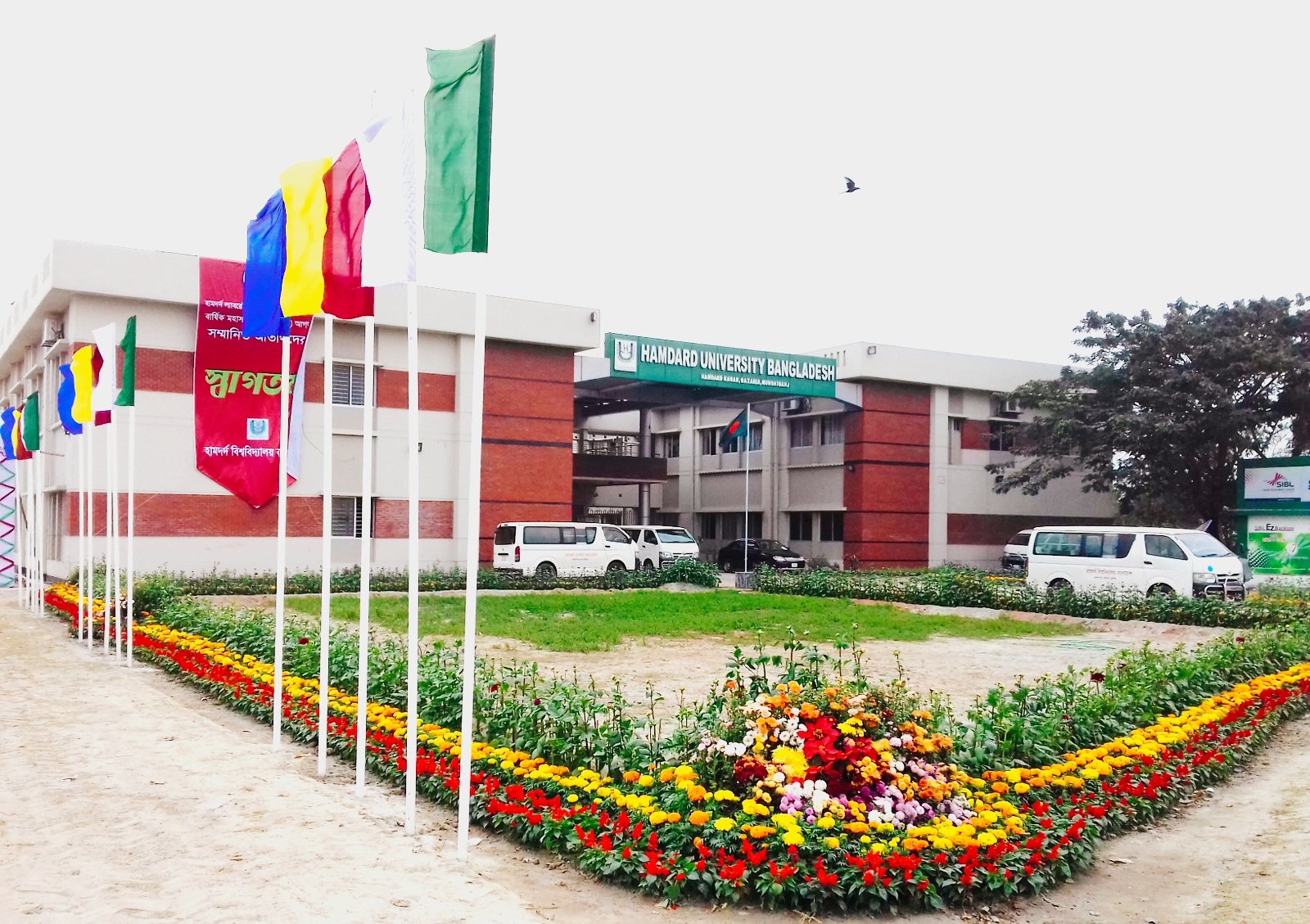
Hamdard University Bangladesh in 2017

The foundation set up various institutions in the education and healthcare sectors. It founded Hamdard Unani Medical College and Hospital in Bogra District in 1990. It established Hakim Said Eastern Medical College & Hospital in 2008. In Lakshmipur District, it launched Rawshan Jahan Eastern Medical College and Hospital the same year.

In 2010, the foundation established Hamdard Public College. It set up Hamdard University Bangladesh on 29 November 2012. These five institutions teach students about Eastern medicine (Unani and Ayurvedic).

Hamdard Museum was established in January 2022.

== Products ==
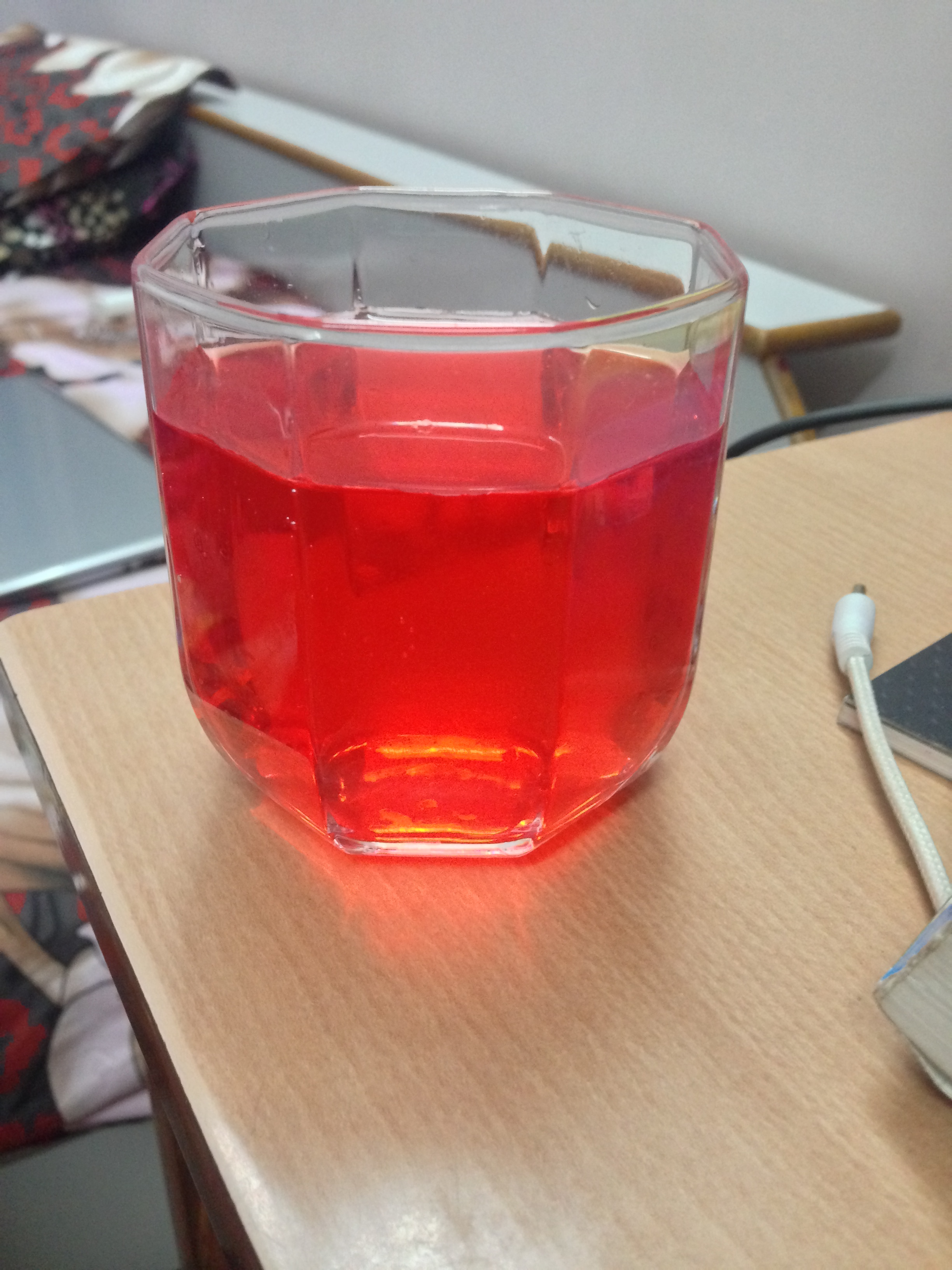
Rooh Afza syrup mixed with water

Hamdard is licensed by the government of Bangladesh to produce herbal medicine. It makes both Unani and Ayurvedic ones. Traditional medicines are widely used in Bangladesh. In 2016, the domestic market for herbal or traditional products was estimated to be 3 billion Bangladeshi taka ($38M as of 2016). As of 2019, Hamdard produced about 200 herbal medications. They market their capsules, tablets, ointments, and syrups as treatments for a wide variety of ailments.

Hamdard also makes soap, honey, and a thick red syrup, Rooh Afza. The latter, created in 1907 by Hakeem Hafiz Abdul Majeed, is also produced by Hamdard India and Hamdard Pakistan. The recipe is a trade secret. According to The New York Times, it is four-fifths sugar. Majeed is known to have used rose petals, mint, and khas, a fragrant grass. Among its more than 20 ingredients are chicory, coriander, fragrant screwpine, fruit juice, and red food coloring. Typically, the syrup is mixed into water or milk to make a drink, or used in desserts. It is popular in South Asia's hot summers and as a way to break one's daytime fast during Ramadan. The bright crimson syrup also has an "off-label use" as a key ingredient of fake blood at Dhallywood film studios.

== Operations ==
The company is one of the largest herbal medicine producers in the country. Its headquarters is in Hamdard Bhaban at 291/1 Sonargaon Road in Dhaka. The company has over 300 acres (120 ha) in Chittagong District for growing medicinal plants. It runs its own research laboratories and has a factory in Sonargaon Upazila. As of 2019, it has around 200 health centers and hospitals where, other than the cost of medication, treatment is free.

Hamdard Laboratories (Waqf) Bangladesh traces its origins to what are now Hamdard India and Hamdard Pakistan. The operations of the three are separate and independent. Each is managed by its own board of trustees and regulated by the waqf board of their respective country. The Office of the Waqf Administrator, under the Ministry of Religious Affairs, regulates Hamdard Laboratories (Waqf) Bangladesh. Hakim Md. Yousuf Harun Bhuiyan is the managing director of the company and the chief mutawalli (trustee) of the waqf.
