= Hamdard India =

Unani pharmaceutical company

Hamdard Laboratories (India)
- Type: Non-profit
- Industry: Healthcare, Food
- Founded: 1906; 120 years ago Old Delhi, British India
- Founder: Hafiz Abdul Majeed; Ansarullah Tabani
- Headquarters: New Delhi, India
- Key people: Hamid Ahmed (CEO)
- Products: Hamdard Laboratories - Safi, Roghan Badam Shirin, Sualin, Joshina, Cinkara; Hamdard Food Division - Rooh Afza
- Brands: Rooh Afza, Hamdard Khaalis, Hamdard Glucose-D, Hamdard Diabeat
- Website: hamdard.in (Healthcare division); hamdard.com (Food division)

Hamdard Laboratories (India) is an Indian Unani pharmaceutical and food company established in 1906 by Hakeem Hafiz Abdul Majeed in Delhi. It is known for its popular Unani products, such as Safi, Raughan-e-Badam Shireen, Sualin, Joshina, and Cinkara. Their food division is best known for Rooh Afza. Hamdard Laboratories (India) is associated with the Hamdard National Foundation, a charitable educational trust.

== History ==
Hamdard Laboratories was founded in 1906 in Delhi, India by Hakeem Hafiz Abdul Majeed and Ansarullah Tabani, who were both Unani practitioners. The name Hamdard (हमदर्द / ہمدرد) is a Hindi-Urdu word loaned from Persian, which means "companion in suffering". Hakim Hafiz Abdul Majeed was born in the city of Pilibhit, in modern-day Uttar Pradesh in 1883 to Sheikh Rahim Bakhs. He is said to have learnt the complete Quran Sharif by heart. He also studied the origin of Urdu and Persian languages. Subsequently, he acquired the highest degree in the Unani system of medicine. Hakim Hafiz Abdul Majeed got in touch with Hakim Zamal Khan, who had a keen interest in herbs and was famous for identifying medicinal plants. Having consulted with his wife, Abdul Majeed set up a herbal shop at Hauz Qazi in Delhi in 1906 and began producing herbal medicines there. In 1920, the small herbal shop turned into a full-fledged production house.

After the founder's passing in 1922, his wife Rabea Begum and her two sons founded the 'Hamdard Trust,' with a commitment to allocate 85 percent of its profits for charitable purposes. His son Hakeem Abdul Hameed took over the administration of Hamdard Laboratories at the age of fourteen. Abdul Hameed would then be joined by his younger brother Hakeem Muhammad Saeed in running the company until the latter's move to Pakistan in 1948 and forming Hamdard Pakistan in Karachi. Hamdard Foundation was created in 1964 to disburse the profits of the company to promote the interests of society. All the company's profits go to the foundation. Hamdard Laboratories has a twin manufacturing plant in Ghaziabad, Uttar Pradesh and one plant in Manesar, Haryana.

== Products ==
The company has over 500 natural and herb-based products. Some of its known products are Sharbat Rooh Afza, Safi, Pachnaul, Roghan Badam Shirin, Sualin, Joshina, and Cinkara.

== See also ==
- Hamdard Pakistan
- Hamdard Laboratories (Waqf) Bangladesh
- Hamdard Public School
- Jamia Hamdard
- CRIUM, Hyderabad
