= Hamdard Public School =

Location
- Sangam Vihar, New Delhi - 110062; New Delhi, India; 28°30′21.8″N 77°15′03.2″E

Information
- Type: Private School
- Motto: Knowledge is Power
- Established: 1993
- Founder: Hakeem Abdul Hameed
- Principal: Khwaja Kutubuddin
- Affiliation: Central Board of Secondary Education
- Website: http://www.hamdardpublicschool.in/

Hamdard Public School situated in Sangam Vihar is a co-educational, senior secondary school in New Delhi, India, affiliated to the Central Board of Secondary Education. It is recognized by the Department of Education, Govt. of NCT Delhi and the Ministry of HRD, Govt. of India. It has received the International School Award by British Council. It is also a member of the National Progressive Schools' Conference (NPSC).

== History ==
The school was founded in 1993 by Hakim Abdul Hameed, a Padma Bhushan and Padma Shri awardee and Saiyid Hamid who was a member of Indian Administrative Service and also served as the Vice Chancellor of Aligarh Muslim University. It is a Senior Secondary School preparing students for both All India Secondary School Examination and All India Senior School Certificate Examination. In class 11 and 12, students have to choose one of 5 streams: Non-Medical, Medical, Commerce with Maths, Commerce without Maths or Humanities. The school is run by the Hamdard Education Society, whose secretary is Syed Samar Hamid.

It is recognized as a minority school.

== Alumni ==
=== Arts and entertainment ===
- Wasim Mushtaq (2003), TV actor

=== Sports ===
- Aamir Akhtar (1999), Former Nepali cricketer, Founder Everest Premier League (EPL)

== See also ==
- Hamdard Public College
- Hamdard University Bangladesh
- Hamdard University Karachi
- Jamia Hamdard
- List of schools in Delhi
