= Abu Tayeb Muhammad Zahirul Alam =

Bangladeshi army general

- Born: 1952 (age 73–74); Boalkhali, East Bengal, Pakistan
- Military career
- Allegiance: Bangladesh
- Branch: Bangladesh Army
- Service years: 1975–2008
- Rank: Lieutenant General
- Unit: East Bengal Regiment
- Commands: Commandant of the NDC; MGO of Army Headquarters; GOC of 66th Infantry Division; Director of Military Training at Army Headquarters; Commander of 44th Infantry Brigade
- Conflicts: UNIKOM; UNMIL
- Awards: Sword of Honour (BMA)

Abu Tayeb Muhammad Zahirul Alam is a retired lieutenant general of the Bangladesh Army. He served as force commander of the United Nations Mission in Liberia (UNMIL). Previously he was the commandant of the Bangladesh National Defence College. He is serving as chairman of Hamdard Public College's governing body.

== Personal life and education ==
He was born in 1952 in Boalkhali, East Bengal (now Bangladesh). He is married and has two children.

Alam obtained his master's degree in war studies from King's College London in 1993, where he was a Chevening Scholar, and has studied at the Royal College of Defence Studies in the United Kingdom.

== Career ==
=== In Army ===
He joined the army in 1975 and has served in various capacities. From 1998 to 2000, he was director of military training at the Army headquarters. During 2001–2003, he served as division commander. Prior to his appointment as force commander of United Nations Mission in Liberia (UNMIL), he was serving as commandant of the National Defence College, from 04 Jan 2004 to 12 Jun 2008. He was supposed to join the High Commission to Australia as an ambassador, but later Lieutenant General Masud Uddin Chowdhury joined instead. Then, he got the prestigious appointment as force commander at Liberia.

=== UN mission ===
From 1994 to 1996, he commanded a mechanized infantry battalion within the United Nations Iraq-Kuwait Observer Mission (UNIKOM). He was appointed as force commander of UNMIL by United Nations Secretary-General Ban Ki-moon in October 2008.

=== Post-retirement ===
After retirement, Zahirul joined as president of the seven-member executive committee of the Chevening Society of Bangladesh. He served as chairman of the Audit Committee of United Commercial Bank. He was chef de mission of the Bangladesh contingent for the Rio Olympics.
