= Hakim Abdul Hameed =

Indian physician of the traditional system of Unani

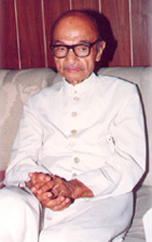
- Born: 14 September 1908; Delhi, British Raj
- Died: 22 June 1999 (aged 90); India
- Occupations: Educationist; Unani Physician; Philanthropist
- Known for: Unani medicine and education
- Awards: Padma Shri (1965); Padma Bhushan (1992)

Hakim Abdul Hameed (Urdu: حکیم عبدالحمید; 14 September 1908 – 22 July 1999) was an Indian physician of the traditional medicine system of Unani, the founder chancellor of Jamia Hamdard, and a former chancellor of Aligarh Muslim University (1996–1999).

His ancestors came from Kashgar (now Kashi, Xinjiang, China) to the Indian subcontinent, in the reign of the Mughal emperor, Shah Alam. He was the founder and chief trustee of Hamdard Laboratories. He was honoured by the Government of India in 1965, with the award of Padma Shri, the fourth highest Indian civilian award and in 1992, the government awarded him the third highest Indian honour of Padma Bhushan. He was the elder brother of the Hakeem Muhammad Saeed.

== Contributions ==
He established Hamdard Public School, New Delhi in 1993. He was instrumental in establishing several academic institutions like Jamia Hamdard, Hamdard National Foundation, Hamdard Education Society, Hamdard Study Circle, Hamdard Public School, Hamdard Institute of Historical Research, Ghalib Academy, Centre for South Asian Studies, and Business and Employment Bureau.

To continue his philanthropic work, he established Hamdard Charitable Trust in 1948 and Hamdard National Foundation in 1964. He was a Unani Physician who established Majeedia Hospital. It is now known as HAH Centenary Hospital (Modern Medicine) and Majeedia Hospital (Unani).

=== Awards ===
Hakeem Abdul Hameed was awarded Padma Shri in 1965 and Padma Bhushan in 1992. He was awarded the Avicenna award in 1983. In 2000, he was awarded the IRCICA Award for Patronage in Preservation of Cultural Heritage & Promotion of Scholarship by Research Centre for Islamic History, Art and Culture (IRCICA) Istanbul, Turkey.

== See also ==
- Jamia Hamdard
- Hamdard (Wakf) Laboratories
- Aligarh Muslim University
