= Hamdard Pakistan =

Pakistani pharmaceutical company

- Type: Waqf
- Industry: Unani (Herbal Medicine); Pharmaceutical company
- Founded: 1948; 78 years ago Karachi, Pakistan
- Founder: Hakim Said
- Headquarters: Karachi, Pakistan
- Area served: Pakistan
- Key people: Sadia Rashid (Chairperson)
- Products: Rooh Afza, Safi and Carmina
- Website: hamdard.com.pk

Hamdard Pakistan (Urdu: ہمدرد پاکستان) is a Pakistani unani medicine company which is based in Karachi, Pakistan. It was established by Hakim Saeed as Hamdard Laboratories (Waqf) in 1948.

== History ==
Hakim Abdul Majeed (1883 – 1922) founded an organization called Hamdard Dawakhana in Delhi in 1906. At that time, it was a small clinic and herbal medicine shop. Abdul Majeed had come from a family that included many herbal doctors, and he joined the herbal pharmacy of the renowned Unani physician Hakim Ajmal Khan. As he developed his knowledge of medicine, he became a Hakim and decided to establish his own pharmacy and clinic, which he called Hamdard Dawakhana. Rooh Afza syrup was officially launched in 1907.

In 1940, Abdul Majeed's youngest son Hakim Mohammed Saeed joined Hamdard Dawakhana. By 1947, Hamdard became a prominent manufacturer of herbal products and medicines in the Indian subcontinent.

After the independence of Pakistan in 1947, Saeed, at the age of 29, migrated to Pakistan on 9 January 1948. The following year, he established Hamdard Laboratories Pakistan in the old area of Arambagh, Karachi on a modest scale. Saeed was able to make Hamdard profitable and the leading manufacturer of herbal medicines and products in Pakistan in six years – by 1953.

In 1953, when Hamdard had become a big pharmaceutical company, Saeed declared it a Waqf (a Muslim endowment entity).

Hakim Saeed's daughter, Sadia Rashid, chairperson of the company in 2016, reportedly said that her father had also opened up a branch of 'Hamdard Pakistan' in the former East Pakistan. After the independence of Bangladesh in 1971, her father had given that branch to the people of Bangladesh.

== Products ==
Hamdard Laboratories produces more than six hundred (600) Herbal Products.

Hamdard has a full range of medicines for digestive disorders of stomach and intestine, abdominal cramps, hyper-acidity etc., anemia, jaundice, purification of blood from impurities, liver ailments, female ailments like leucorrhoea, menstrual irregularities and for protection of pregnancy. Products are also available for naturally strengthening the nervous system and mental health, heart and other vital organs. Hormonal and sexual insufficiency in men, general debility, mental and physical exhaustion, rheumatism and joints diseases, skin diseases, common cold, and a wide range of other physical problems are addressed with Hamdard products.

Khamira Abresham Hakim Arshad Wala is a unique herbal medicine from Hamdard Pakistan which is effective in strengthening vital organs like heart, brain, and liver. Its positive cardioprotective effect has been substantiated by various studies.

=== Most popular products ===
- Rooh Afza (Soul Refresher) - a thirst-quencher and refreshing cold drink (Hamdard's flagship brand is Rooh Afza). It is an all-seasons drink rather than a summer drink. Rooh Afza alone generates about 33 per cent of Hamdard's revenues in the Indian market. It is a choice for millions of Pakistanis at 'Iftar' time (breaking of the day-long fast during the month of Ramadan) and it is exported to 33 countries of the world.

Abdul Majeed, CEO of 'Hamdard India' reportedly said about Rooh Afza, "When I started working and looked at Rooh Afza, I would come up with suggestions on what we could add to make it better. For six months, I went on harping about all these changes. My grandfather then called me and explained that a lot of time had been invested in the product and after many years, it had now stabilized. We now had a product that best suited peoples' needs...if it is working, why do you need to fix it?"

The following medicines are available through 30 Hamdard clinics across Pakistan:

- Safi
- Carmina
- Miswak Toothpaste
- Isapghol Khas
- Sualin
- Naunehal Herbal Grip Water

== Research and development ==
Hamdard Laboratories central structure is based in Karachi, consisting of fully automated pharmaceutical manufacturing and research units, manufacturing a wide spectrum of herbal products. Recently, a new industrial complex has been set up about 40 km from Karachi.

Apart from Karachi, manufacturing units operate in other Pakistani cities. In Lahore a factory produces syrups and medicines.

A factory at Peshawar makes syrups, extractive distillates, semi-solid and solid preparations.

== See also ==
- Hamdard India
- Hamdard College of Medicine & Dentistry
- Hamdard University
- Hamdard Laboratories (Waqf) Bangladesh
