= Hamdard University =

University in Pakistan

- جامعہَ ہمدرد
- Seal of Hamdard University
- Motto: In Pursuit of Excellence
- Type: Private university
- Established: 1991
- Founder: Hakim Said
- Academic affiliations: Higher Education Commission of Pakistan; National Computing Education Accreditation Council; Pakistan Engineering Council; Pharmacy Council of Pakistan; Pakistan Medical & Dental Council
- Chancellor: Sadia Rashid
- President: Sadia Rashid
- Vice-Chancellor: Dr. Imran Amin
- Students: 5,200
- Undergraduates: 4,000
- Postgraduates: 1,000
- Doctoral students: 200
- Location: Karachi: Main Campus: • Shahrah-e-Madinat-al-Hikmah, Northern Bypass; City Campuses: • CC-I: Tipu Sultan Road, Adamjee Nagar; • CC-II: Khalid bin Waleed Road, PECHS; Islamabad: • City Campus is located at A.K.M. Fazl-ul-Haq Rd, Blue Area; • Main Campus Madinat Ul Hikmat is located at Kurri Road, near NIH; Pakistan
- Campus: Suburban,141.6 ha (350 acres) (main) Urban (others)
- Colours: Green, gray
- Website: www.hamdard.edu.pk

Hamdard University (Urdu: جامعہَ ہمدرد) is a private research university with campuses in Karachi and Islamabad, Pakistan. It was founded in 1991 by the philanthropist Hakim Said of the Hamdard Foundation. It is one of the first and oldest private institutions of higher education in Pakistan, and also is the largest private research university in Karachi, with a campus area of over 141.6 ha (350 acres).

Hamdard University's central library Bait-ul-Hikmah is one of the largest research libraries in South Asia with a collection of over half a million books, some of them dating back to the 17th century. The university includes eight faculties, nine research institutes, three teaching hospitals, and three affiliated engineering institutes.

== Recognition ==
Major programs of Hamdard University are accredited by and offered in collaboration with bodies such as the Higher Education Commission (HEC), Pakistan Engineering Council (PEC), Pakistan Medical and Dental Council (PMDC), Pakistan Bar Council (PBC), National Telecommunication Corporation (NTC), and the Pakistan Pharmacy Council (PCP).

== History ==
HEC University Rankings
- Category Qualification: Medium
- General Ranking: 11
- Teaching Quality: 6.82
- QA Criteria: 7.0
- R&D: 2.12
- Accumulative Ranking: 16.0
- Engineering: N/A
- Medical: N/A
- Business: N/A
- Law: N/A

Hamdard University was established on 9 October 1991, by a provisional act of the Sindh Assembly. The founding chancellor, Hakim Said, had been long advocating for the establishment of private-sector higher education learning institutions. He received the university's charter from then-President Ghulam Ishaq Khan in a solemn ceremony. The university is named after Said's philanthropy and education lobby organisation, the Hamdard Foundation.

An area of about 72 ha (180 acres) was earmarked at Madinat al-Hikmah: "a City of Education, Science, and Culture" in Bund Murad neighborhood of Gadap Town in Karachi.

Stretching over an area of 141.6 ha (350 acres), Madinat al-Hikmah includes, in addition to the establishments of the university, Hamdard Garden, sports stadium, Hamdard Public School and college, operating as its earliest institutions, imparting education from primary to higher secondary level, and Bait al-Hikmah library. The Institute of Education & Social Sciences (HIESS) and College of Eastern Medicine (HACEM) were among the earliest institutions established. The other institutions that appeared in the later stages include Hamdard College of Medicine & Dentistry (HCM&D), Hamdard Institute of Management Sciences (HIMS), Hamdard Institute of Engineering Technology (HIET), Faculty of Engineering Sciences and Technology (FEST), Usman Institute of Technology (UIT), Hamdard School of Law (HSL), Hamdard Institute of Pharmaceutical Sciences (HIPS), Bait al-Hikmah Institute of Research, and Regional CISCO Networking Academy.

In 1996, the first city campus of the university was established at Adamjee Nagar. Later on, another city campus operating weekend and evening programs was started in PECHS, Karachi. The number of campuses increased with the establishment of Islamabad and Faisalabad campuses in 1998 and 2000 respectively. During the period, five Lahore-, Islamabad- and Karachi-based organisations, imparting professional education, became affiliated with the university.

== Campuses ==
Hamdard University has four major campuses in two main cities of Pakistan: three in Karachi (the financial hub of Pakistan) and one in Islamabad – the capital city.

=== Karachi campuses ===
Out of the three campuses in Karachi, the one at Northern Bypass is the oldest and the largest. It is known as the Main Campus. The others are in downtown Karachi and are known as the City Campuses.

==== Main campus ====
The main campus of Hamdard University is in the vicinity of the Sindh—Balochistan border, 28 km from the commercial center of Karachi, on the main highway leading to Murad Khan Dam.

The Main Campus houses institutes and faculties which include:

- Institute of Information Technology
- Institute of Management Sciences
- Faculty of Eastern Medicine
- Faculty of Health and Medical Sciences
- Faculty of Environmental Sciences
- Faculty of Humanities
- Faculty of Pharmacy, and Social Sciences.

==== City campuses (old) ====
Previously there were two major City Campuses, in addition to the Main Campus, in Karachi:

- City Campus I – Adamjee Nagar, Karachi (24.879059°N 67.083935°E)
- City Campus II – PECHS, Karachi (24.8802°N 67.0580°E)

CC-I is an extension for the Hamdard Institute of Management Sciences (HIMS) and CC-II is the campus of Hamdard Institute of Engineering Technology (HIET), and is used to offer training courses, certifications and diplomas. It houses the Graduate School of Engineering Sciences and Information Technology and Hamdard School of Law.

=== Islamabad campuses ===
Hamdard University Islamabad main campus is located at Kuri Road Islamabad which is spread over an area of 4 ha (9.9 acres). Hamdard University Islamabad also has a city campus in Blue Area near China Chowk. The Islamabad campus started its operations in the year 1998 in a small building in F8. The Islamabad Campus houses three institutes:

- Hamdard Institute of Information Technology
- Hamdard Institute of Management Sciences
- Hamdard Institute of Pharmaceutical Sciences

Hamdard Institute of Pharmacy and Hamdard Institute of Management Sciences have been shifted to the main Campus in May 2019 whereas Hamdard Institute of Engineering and Technology will shift later this year.

== Faculties and institutes ==
Hamdard University offers undergraduate and post-graduate education through its institutions/faculties which are based on the campus.

=== Faculty of Engineering Sciences and Technology ===
FEST (Faculty of Engineering Sciences and Technology) offers its bachelor's, master's, and doctorate degrees through its three institutions: GSESIT, HIET – Karachi and HIET – Islamabad.

==== GSESIT ====
This school was established in 1997 with the name of Hamdard Institute of Information Technology (HIIT). Later on, due to its main focus on graduate programs, it was renamed the Graduate School of Engineering Sciences and Information Technology (GSESIT). Initially, M.S Information Technology was offered with the inception of the institute. In fall 2002, M.S Software Engineering program was introduced. Recently, new Masters, M.Phil., and PhD degree programs are being offered. The IEEE Student Branch was also established at GSESIT to create research and innovation activities.

GSESIT offers the following graduate and research programs:

Master of Sciences/Philosophy:
- M.E. (Electronic Engineering)
- M.E. (Telecommunication Engineering)
- M.E. (Energy Engineering)
- M.E. (Control & Automation)
- M.E. (Signal Processing)
- M.S. (Information Technology)
- M.S. (Software Engineering)
- M.S. (Telecommunications)
- M.Phil. (Environmental Sciences)
Doctorate/mscellaneous programs:
- PhD (Environmental Sciences)
- PhD (Computer Sciences)
- PhD (Computer Engineering)
- PhD (Electrical Engineering)
- PhD (Electronics Engineering)
- PhD (Information Technology)
- PhD (Telecommunication Engineering)
- PhD (Software Engineering)
- Other certifications and short courses such as CCNA, Java, and Web programming, etc.

==== HIET – Karachi ====
Hamdard Institute of Engineering Technology, Karachi was established in 1997 at the Main Campus. Initially it offered graduate programmes only. Later on, the graduate studies were offered under the institute of GSESIT and HIET – Karachi was dedicated for the bachelor's programs only. The institute offers the following programs:

Bachelor of Engineering:
- B.E. (Bio-Medical Engineering)
- B.E. (Computer-Systems Engineering)
- B.E. (Electrical Engineering)
- B.E. (Electronics Engineering)
- B.E. (Energy Engineering)
- B.E. (Industrial Engineering)
- B.E. (Mechanical Engineering)
- B.E. (Telecommunication Engineering)
- B.E. (Polymer Engineering)
- B.E. (Textile Engineering)
Bachelor of Science:
- B.S. (Computer Science)
- B.S. (Software Engineering)
- B.S. (Multimedia Technology)
- B.S. (Information Technology) – Evening Shift
- B.S. (Digital Forensics and Cyber Security) – Evening Shift
- B.S. (Telecommunications & Networking)

==== HIET – Islamabad ====
Hamdard Institute of Information Technology, Islamabad is a constituent institute of Hamdard University, Islamabad Campus which came into being with the establishment of Islamabad Campus in 2000. It initially offered Bachelors in Computer Science, Information Technology and Computer-Systems Engineering. Then, the institute introduced Engineering programs in Telecommunications and Electronics in 2003. On the advice of PEC, the two engineering programs were merged to form one program as Electrical Engineering. This was applicable from the intake of 2007 and onwards. The institution offers the following programs:

- B.E. (Electrical Engineering)
- B.S. (Computer Science)

=== Faculty of Environmental Sciences ===
The Faculty of Environmental Sciences offers B.S in Environment & Energy Management.

=== Faculty of Management Sciences ===
The Faculty of Management Sciences offers the degrees of Bachelor and Master of Business Administration (B.B.A. & M.B.A.) and M.S. (Management Sciences) through its two constituent institutes: HIMS – Karachi and HIMS – Islamabad.

==== HIMS – Karachi ====
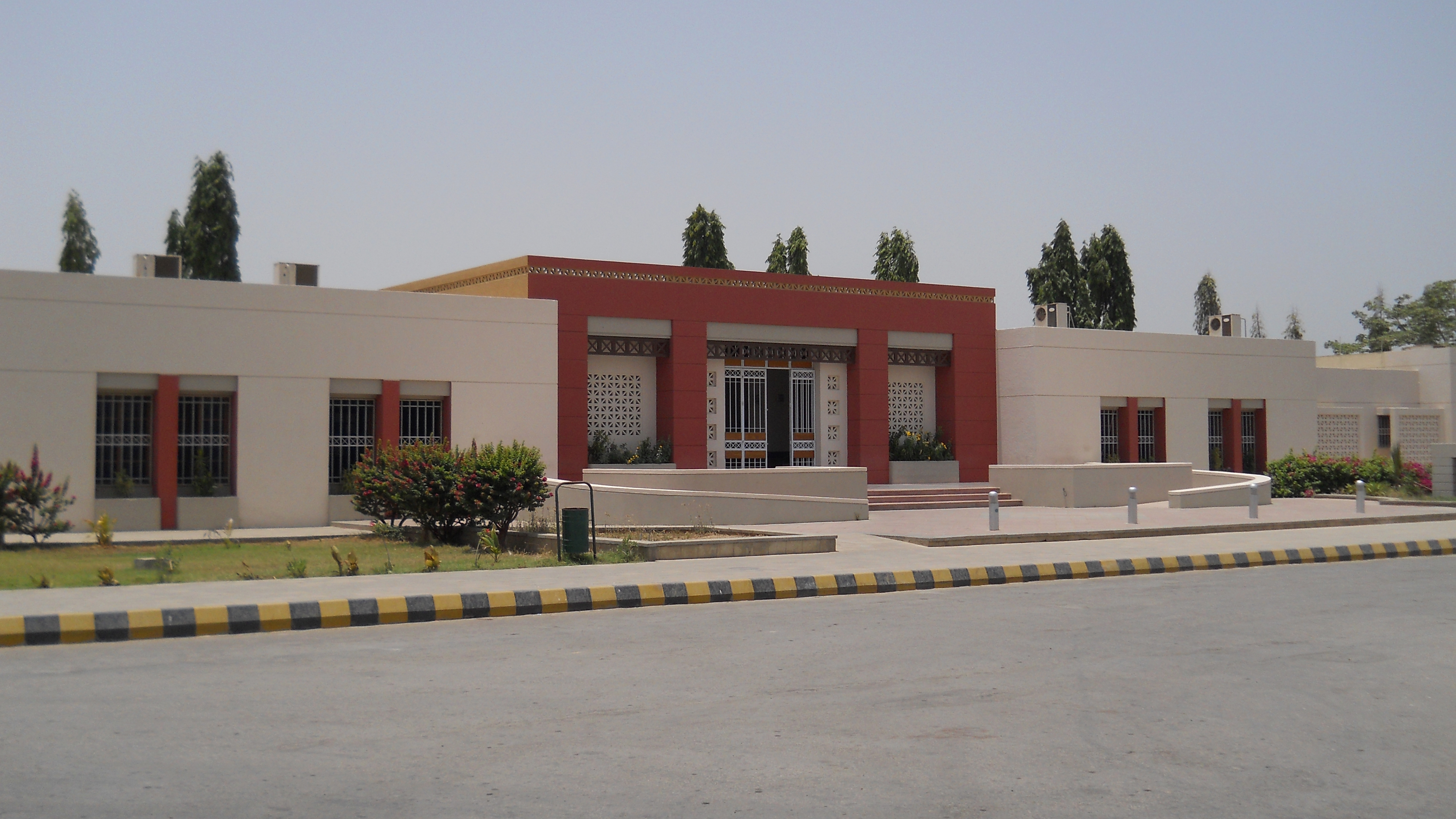
Former building for Hamdard Institute of Management Sciences (HIMS), now Hamdard College of Medicine & Dentistry.

Hamdard Institute of Management Sciences Karachi offers a four-year program of Bachelor of Business Administration in undergraduate category, a Management Sciences program, and a post-graduate M.B.A (Master of Business Administration) program which has been divided into four categories with respect to the time-span and previous education:

- A 3 1/2-year MBA plan for students with a previous two-year bachelor's degree in any discipline,
- A regular two-year MBA plan for students having a four-year bachelor's degree in any discipline,
- A 1 1/2-year MBA plan for students with a four-year bachelor's degree in business administration (BBA) or equivalent,
- An executive two-year MBA plan for students having a two-year bachelor's degree in any discipline and a professional experience of at least four years in an executive capacity.

City Campus – I is an extension to the Institute of Management Sciences, Karachi.

==== HIMS – Islamabad ====
Hamdard Institute of Management Sciences, Islamabad offers:

- Bachelors in Business Administration
- Masters in Business Administration

=== Faculty of Humanities and Social Sciences ===
The Faculty of Humanities and Social Sciences was inaugurated in 1992. It offers its degrees through Hamdard Institute of Education and Social Sciences (HIESS), which was established as the first constituent institution of Hamdard University's Main Campus. HIESS offers the degree of Bachelor of Education (BEd).

=== Faculty of Eastern Medicine ===
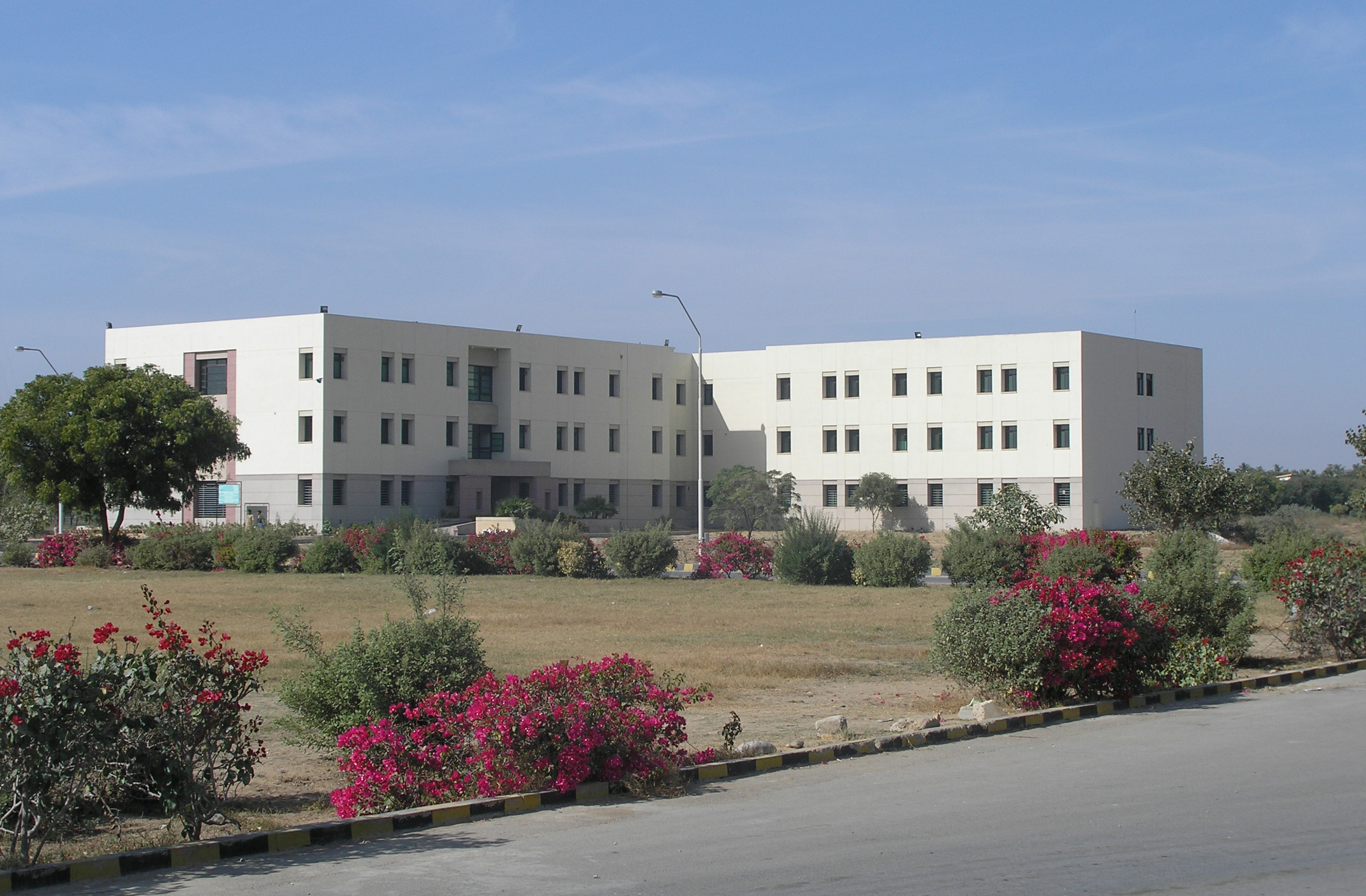
Faculty of Eastern Medicine, Karachi

The Faculty of Eastern Medicine provides education in the field of herbal medicine, which continues to be practised in many of the Islamic countries today.

The Faculty of Eastern Medicine was established "to produce graduates with knowledge of Eastern Medicine with the latest technology for diagnosis and modern methods for the management of diseases and health care". Hamdard Research Institute of Unani Medicine (H.R.I.U.M.) was included in the Faculty of Eastern Medicine as approved by the Academic Council held on 24 April 2008. Currently, the faculty offers the following degrees:

- Bachelor of Eastern Medicine and Surgery (Regular five years)
- Bachelor of Eastern Medicine and Surgery (Condensed Three years)
- M.Phil. and PhD

The degree programs offered by the faculty are accredited by the National Council of Tibb, Ministry of Health – Government of Pakistan and by the Higher Education Commission, Islamabad.

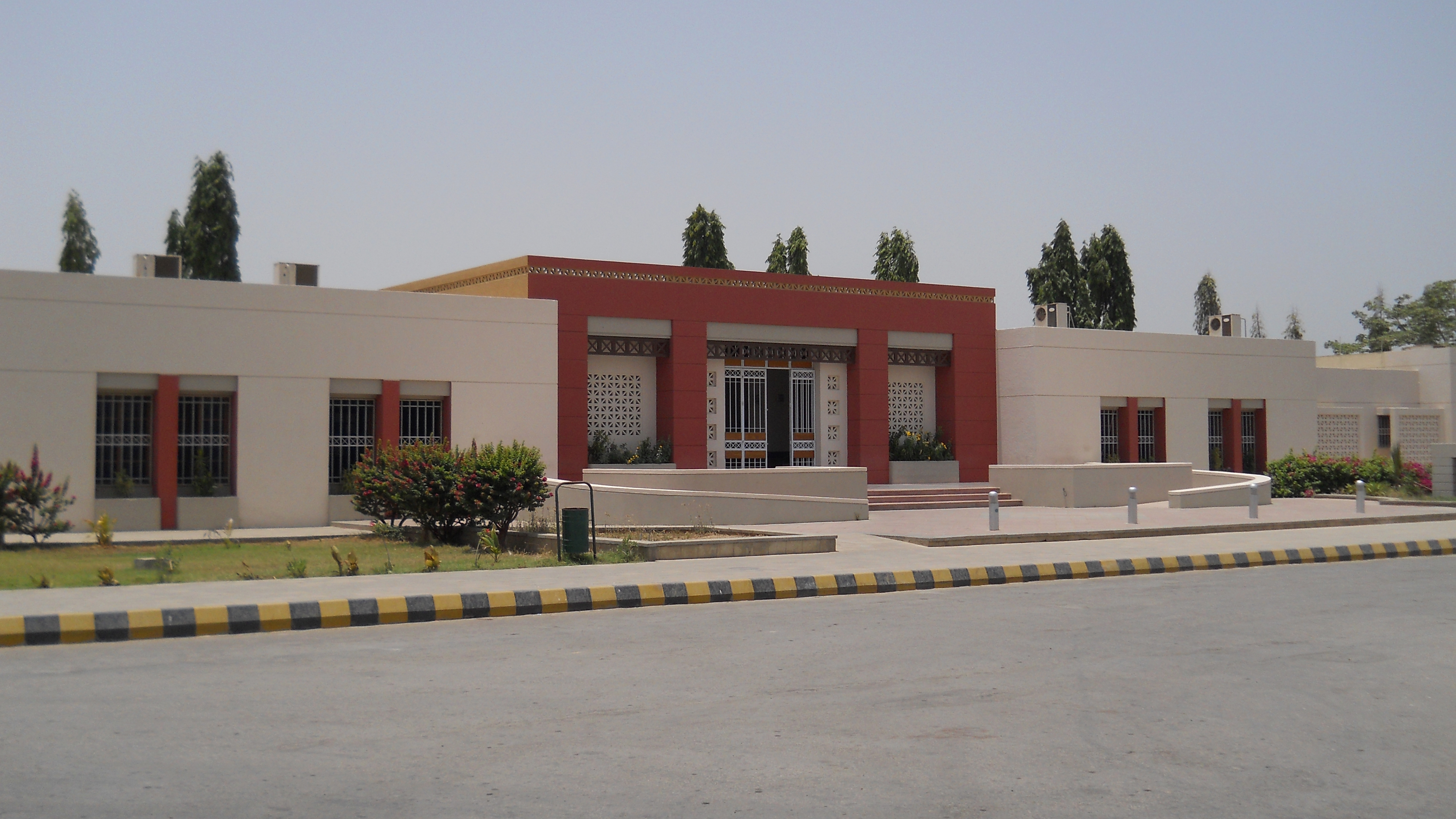
Hamdard College of Medicine & Dentistry

=== Faculty of Health and Medical Sciences ===
Hamdard College of Medicine & Dentistry logo

The Faculty of Health and Medical Sciences offers undergraduate degrees in medicine and dentistry.

The Hamdard College of Medicine & Dentistry (HCM&D) (Urdu: ہمدرد طبی اور دندان سازی کالج) is recognized by the Pakistan Medical & Dental Council, World Health Organization (WHO), Medical Board of California (USA), and FAIMER (Foundation of Advancement of International Medical Education and Research). It is also recognised by the Pakistan Medical Commission.

The college admitted its first M.B B.S batch in 1994 and first B.D.S. batch in 1999. Hamdard College of Medicine & Dentistry is included in the list of permanent members of PMDC under council's ordinance 1962 (Schedule I, III-A and V). The college has been granted recognition by Pakistan Medical Commission for fellowship training in department of General Surgery, Obstetrics & Gynaecology and Operative Dentistry.

=== Faculty of Legal Studies ===
The Hamdard School of Law, as a constituent institution of Hamdard University, opened for admission in January 2001, on the initiative of its former chancellor, Justice (R) Amjad Khan, former Chief Justice of Pakistan and the then-Vice Chancellor. The Faculty of Legal Studies offers the degree of Bachelor of Laws through the Hamdard School of Law. Activities held during the three-year course include:

- Mock courts
- Court visits
- Visits to jails and care homes
- Visits to lawyers' chambers

=== Faculty of Pharmacy ===
The Faculty of Pharmacy was established in 1997. The faculty initially offered the following programs in its early phase (1997–2001):

- Doctor of Pharmacy (Pharm.D.)
- Doctor of Pharmacy (Pharm.D. – Condensed one-year Program)
- M.Phil. & PhD (Pharmacology & Clinical Practices)
- M.Phil. & PhD (Pharmaceutics)
- M.Phil. & PhD (Pharmacognosy)
- M.Phil. & PhD (Pharm. Chemistry)

In 2001, the Faculty of Pharmacy introduced an innovative B.Pharm., MBA program combining Pharmaceutical and Management Sciences for the first time in Pakistan.

Keeping in view the changing global trends and advances in pharmaceutical sciences, the Pharmacy Council of Pakistan and Higher Education Commission have upgraded the pharmacy syllabi and introduced an advanced program of Pharm.D. extending over five years.

==== HIPS – Karachi ====
Hamdard Institute of Pharmaceutical Sciences, Karachi offers a Doctor of Pharmacy (Pharm. D.) degree. HIPS – Karachi provides education to the students in collaboration with Hamdard University Hospital, Taj Medical Complex, K.V. Social Security Hospital, SITE, and the Hamdard Dental Hospital.

==== HIPS – Islamabad ====
Hamdard Institute of Pharmaceutical Sciences, Islamabad offers its Pharm. D. degree in collaboration with Federal Government Services Hospital in Islamabad. The students have the opportunity to interact and visit the 27 allied dispensaries attached to the hospital.

== Campus facilities ==
=== Student accommodation ===
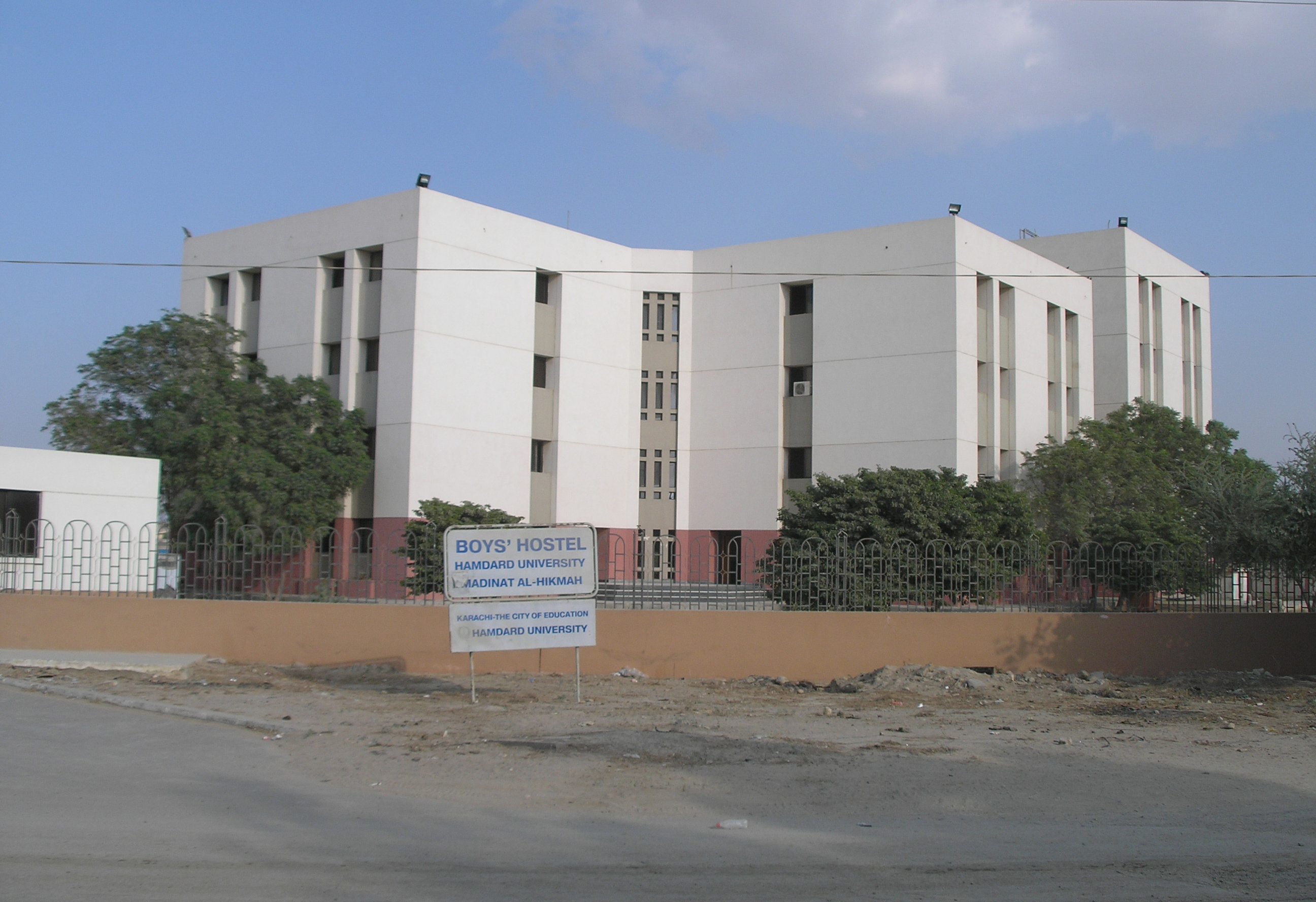
Boys' Hostel, Hamdard University, Main Campus, Karachi

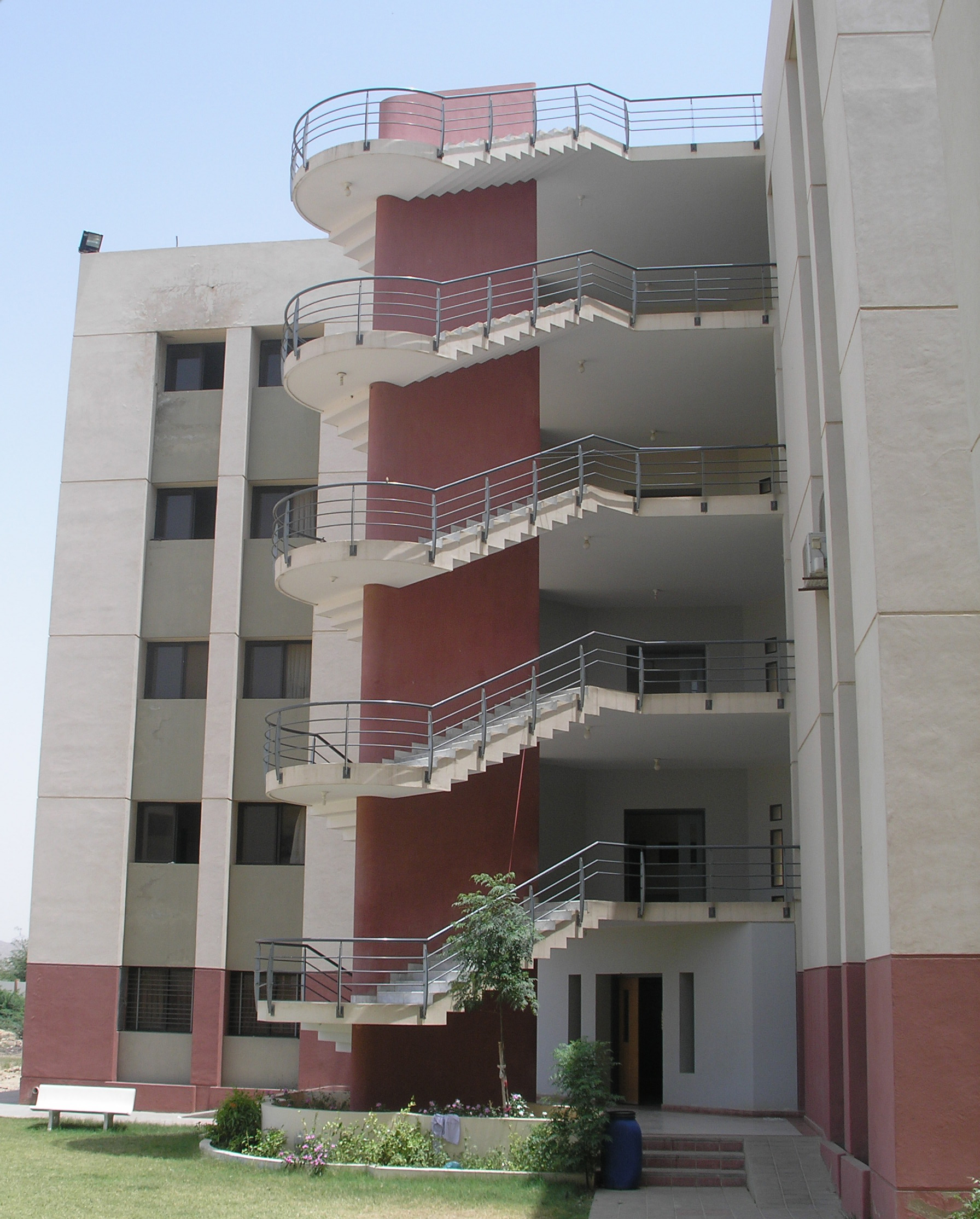
Staircase leading to the upper floors of Boys' Hostel, Main Campus

For the undergraduate students of the Main Campus, Karachi, five hostels are provided. One girls' hostel and four boys' hostels serve as dormitories for the undergraduate students of the Faculty of Engineering Science and Technology, the Faculty of Easter Medicine, the Faculty of Management Sciences, and the Faculty of Health and Medical Sciences. The hostels in the vicinity of Main Campus, Madinat al-Hikmah are:

- A five-storey girls' hostel (25.088572°N 67.007523°E)
- Two two-storey and one five-storey boys' hostel (25.083539°N 67.013017°E)

To accommodate the increasing number of students, one extra building was acquired on lease in 2011. This dormitory serves as a boys' hostel and is in 4-K Chowrangi, North Karachi, which is about 14 kilometres from the Main Campus.

- A two-storey boys' hostel at 4-K Chowrangi, Karachi (25.001908°N 67.065213°E)

=== Cafeteria ===
The Students-Teachers Centre (STC) is the central cafeteria of the main campus, which provides food and a facility for student-teacher interaction. Cafeterias and teashops are also on other campuses.

=== Transport ===
Transportation for students, faculty, and staff members between the Main Campus and different parts of the city is provided by a fleet of university-owned and on-contract vehicles which include buses, Coasters, HiAces, and mini-vans.

=== Libraries ===
==== Bait al-Hikmah ====
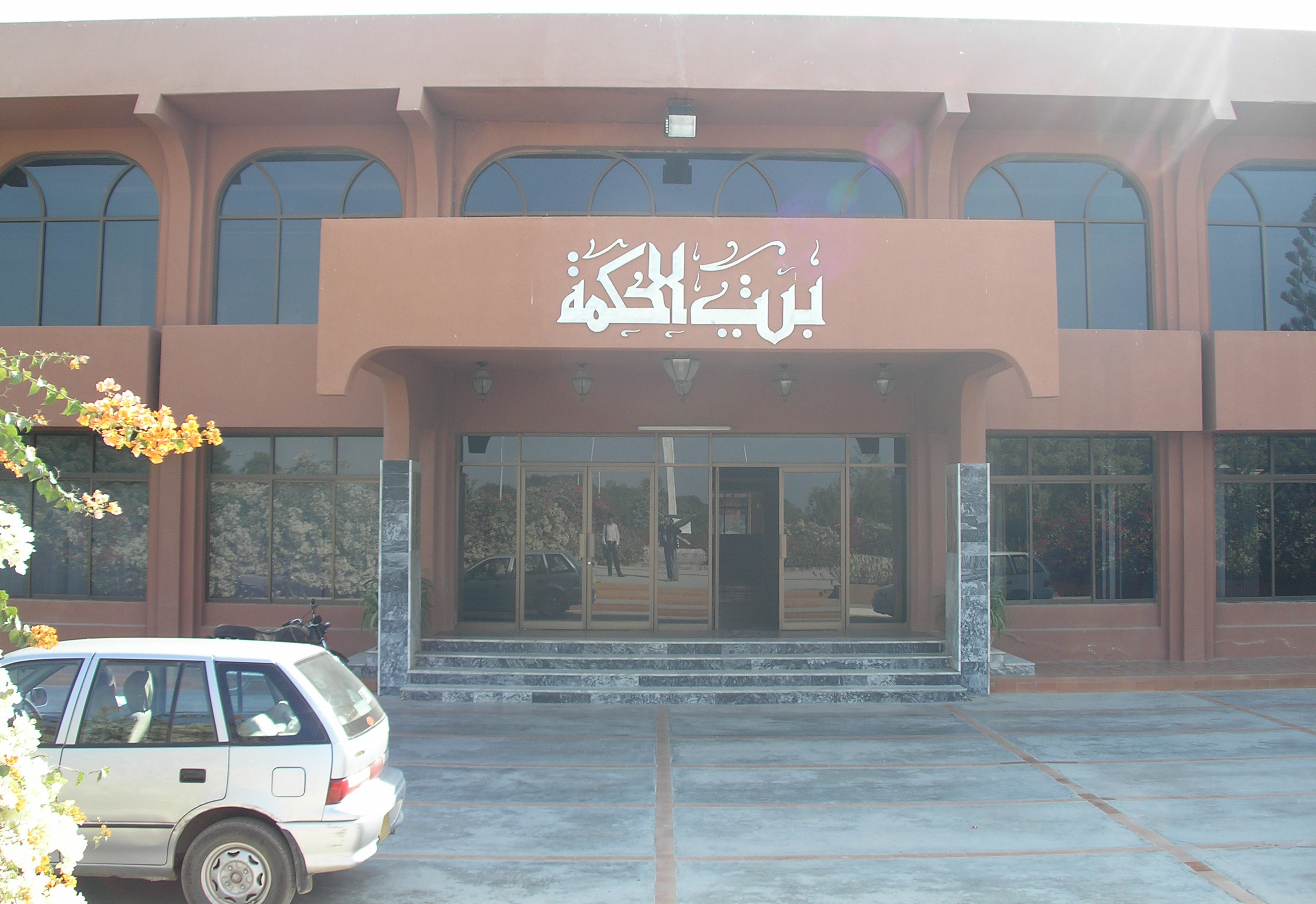
Entrance to Bait al-Hikmah Library

Bait al-Hikmah, named after the famous library, House of Wisdom in Baghdad, is the central library of Hamdard University's Main, Karachi Campus. It houses over half a million modern volumes as well as thousands of ancient manuscripts, millions of clippings, translations of Quran in over 60 languages, A.V. cassettes, as well as postage stamps, coins, and photographs of Hamdard University/Foundation activities, making it one of the largest libraries in South Asia.

The foundation-stone of Bait al-Hikmah was laid on 17 June 1985 by the then-President of Pakistan, General Muhammad Zia-ul-Haq. It was established by Hakim Mohammed Said, the founder of Madinat al-Hikmah. After the completion of the Bait al-Hikmah as the first major and important institution of Madinat al-Hikmah, Hakim Said invited the then-President Ghulam Ishaq Khan to inaugurate the library on 11 December 1989.

The Bait al-Hikmah as a central library and center for academic research is used by students, faculties, researchers, scholars, and freelancers nationally and internationally. It is fully computerised.

The collection of Bait al-Hikmah Library ranges from books and journals covering Science and Technology, Medicine, Management Sciences, Indo-Pakistan History, Islam and Religion, Traditional/Alternative Systems of Medicine, Social Sciences and Jurisprudence, to Literature in Urdu, English, Arabic, and Persian.

==== Departmental libraries ====
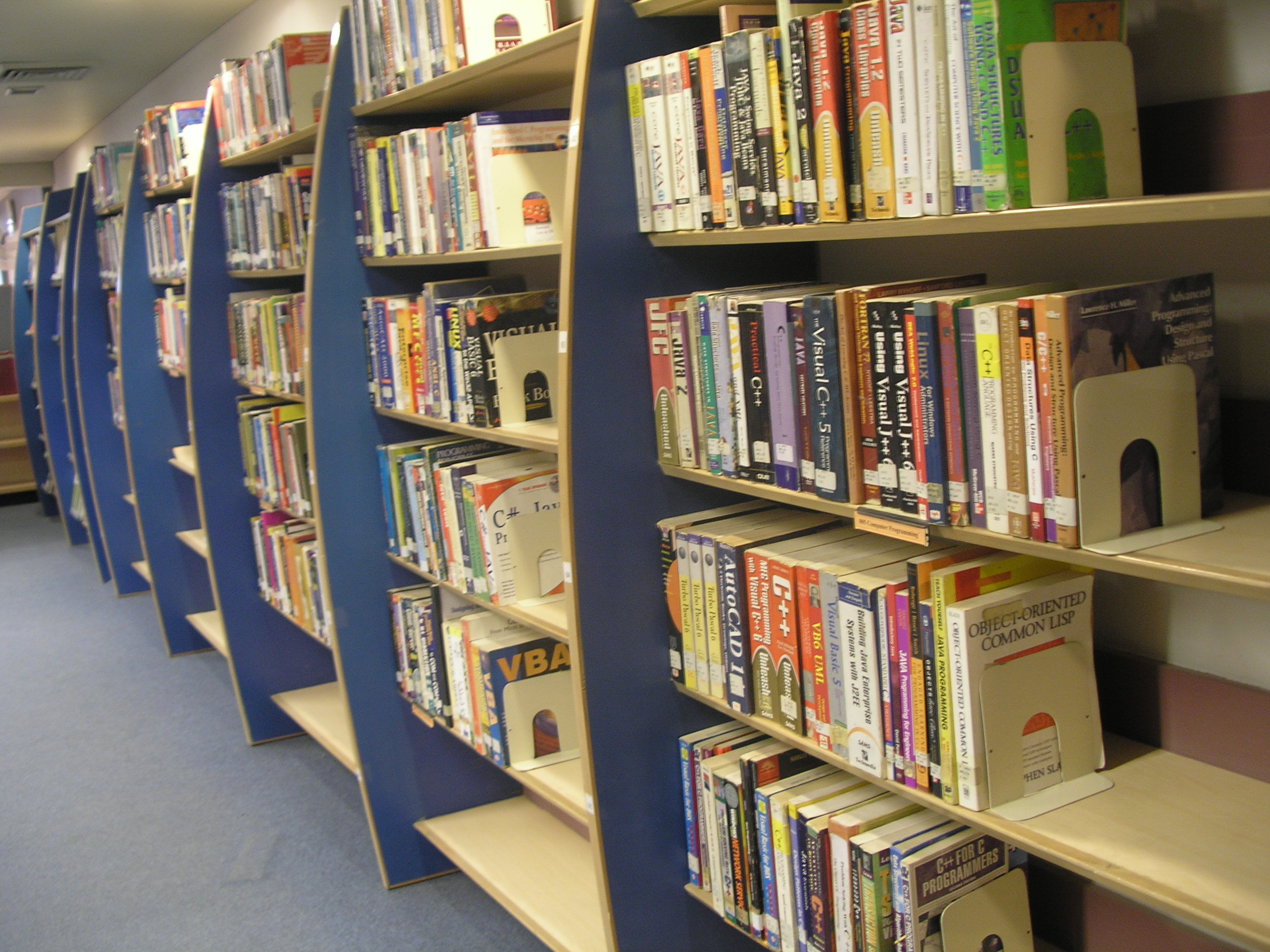
Book-shelves at H.I.I.T. Library

Almost every institute of Hamdard University has a dedicated library which contains books related but not limited to that institute. These include:

- HIET Departmental Library, for the registered students and faculty. It houses books related to Information & Technology, Applied Sciences, and different engineering disciplines. A Book Bank is provided to the students of HIET through the same library.
- HIMS Departmental Library, for registered students and faculty.
- HIESS Departmental Library, for students and faculty.
- Departmental Library of the Faculty of Eastern Medicine
- Departmental Library of the Faculty of Health and Medical Sciences
- Departmental Library of the Faculty of Legal Studies

==== Book Bank ====
Initiated in 2011, the Book Bank (available for the students of HIIT) provides students with references and text-books for a minimal fee of Rs. 50/book for the duration of a semester. Any student of HIIT can register for the Book Bank free of cost and the registration remains effective for a maximum duration of four years (or until the completion of the degree in which the student is enrolled).

== Notable people ==
=== Faculty and staff ===
The renowned Pakistani scientist Abdul Qadeer Khan was Hamdard University's first registered professor of physics in Islamabad and once held the chairmanship of the Department of Physics.

Many scholars have produced cutting-edge research in their respective disciplines, including Islamic scholars Zakariyau Oseni, Zulkadir Siddiqui, historian Mohammad Ishaq Khan, and economist Matin Ahmed Khan. Other faculty members include Sarwar Munir Rao (Mass Communication), electrical engineer Atta-ur-Rehman Memon, and Zillur Rahman (who has been serving as visiting professor of medicine since 1997).

Naveed Akram, one of the perpetrators of 2025 Bondi Beach attack in Sydney, has been identified as an alumnus of Hamdard University, Islamabad.

== See also ==
- List of Islamic educational institutions
- Jamia Hamdard
- Hamdard University Bangladesh
- Hamdard Public College
- Hamdard Public School
