= Hakeem Muhammad Saeed =

Pakistani medical researcher, scholar, philanthropist and governor of Sindh Province

Hakim Muhammad Said NI, SI
- حکیم محمد سعید

20th Governor of Sindh
- In office 19 July 1993 – 23 January 1994
- President: Farooq Leghari
- Prime Minister: Benazir Bhutto
- Preceded by: Mahmoud Haroon
- Succeeded by: Mahmoud Haroon

President of the Hamdard Foundation
- In office 23 October 1969 – 17 October 1998 Serving with Sadia Rashid
- Preceded by: Office created
- Succeeded by: Sadia Rashid (daughter)
- In office 14 August 1948 – 17 October 1998
- Preceded by: Office created
- Succeeded by: Ahsan Qadir Shafiq

Vice-Chancellor of Hamdard University
- In office 14 August 1948 – 17 October 1998
- Chancellor: Mahmoud Haroon
- Preceded by: Office created
- Succeeded by: Nasim Ahmad Khan

Personal details
- Born: Hakeem Muhammed Saeed; 9 January 1920 New Delhi, British India
- Died: 17 October 1998 (aged 78) Karachi, Sindh, Pakistan
- Resting place: Madinat-Al-Hikmah, Karachi
- Citizenship: British subject (1920–1948); Pakistani (1948–1998)
- Party: Independent
- Spouse: Naimat Begum (m. 1945; died 1981)
- Children: Sadia Rashid (daughter)
- Relatives: Hakim Abdul Hameed (brother)
- Education: University of Delhi; Ankara University
- Occupation: Philanthropist, scholar, physician
- Profession: Medical researcher
- Known for: Founder of Hamdard Foundation
- Awards: Nishan-e-Imtiaz Award in (2002); Sitara-i-Imtiaz Award in 1966
- Website: hakim-said.com.pk

Hakeem Muhammad Saeed (Urdu: حکیم محمد سعید; 9 January 1920 – 17 October 1998) was a Pakistani medical researcher, author, scholar, and philanthropist. He served as governor of Sindh Province from 19 July 1993 until 23 January 1994. Saeed was one of Pakistan's most prominent medical researchers in the field of Eastern medicine.

He established the Hamdard Foundation in 1948, prior to his settlement in West Pakistan. In the next few years, the herbal medical products of the Hamdard Foundation became household names in Pakistan. Hakeem Muhammad Saeed authored and compiled about 200 books on medicine, philosophy, science, health, religion, natural medicine, literature, social issues, as well as travelogues. In 1981, Saeed became one of the founding member of the World Cultural Council, a nonprofit international organization, based in Mexico.

On 17 October 1998, Hakeem Saeed was assassinated by a group of unknown assailants while he was on his way to attend a medical experiment at the Hamdard Laboratories in Karachi. His killing prompted Prime Minister of Pakistan, Nawaz Sharif to impose direct federal rule over the Sindh province.

== Early life and career ==
Hakeem Muhammad Said was born in Delhi, British India in 1920 to an educated and religious Urdu-speaking Muhajir family. His ancestors came from Kashgar (now Kashi, Xinjiang, China) to the Indian subcontinent, in the reign of the Mughal emperor, Shah Alam. They first stayed at Peshawar for about eighteen years, then moved to Multan, before finally settling down in Delhi.

His forefathers and family had been associated with the herbal medicine business and had established the Hamdard Waqf Laboratories in India before 1947, which today has emerged as one of the largest manufacturers of Unani medicines in the world. Saeed attended the local school where he learned Arabic, Persian, Urdu, English and studied the Quran. At the age of 18, Hakeem went on to attend the University of Delhi in 1938. There, Saeed obtained a B.Pharmacy degree and a Bachelor of Science degree in medicinal chemistry in 1942. After his undergraduate education, Saeed joined Hamdard Waqf Laboratories as a junior researcher and participated in herbal quality control while formulating medicines. In 1945, Saeed attended the post-graduate course and obtained a master's degree in pharmacy from the same institution. Before 1947, Hakeem Saeed was also involved in the Pakistan Movement activities.

After the independence of Pakistan in 1947, Saeed left his hometown with his wife and only daughter. The family settled in Karachi, Sindh Province of West Pakistan. He established Hamdard Laboratories and served as its first director until his death in 1998. In 1952, Saeed travelled to Turkey where he attended the Ankara University and was awarded a PhD degree in pharmacy, then returned to Pakistan to devote his life to medicine research.

=== Scholarship ===
Following his settlement in Pakistan, Saeed began practicing medicine and continued to research in Eastern medicine. Having established the Hamdard Laboratories in 1948, Saeed was one of the driving forces in Pakistan for engaging in the research in medical biology and medicine. In 1953, after his doctorate degree, Saeed joined the Sindh University as an associate professor of pharmacy and taught courses in organic chemistry. In 1963, Saeed resigned from his position because of differences with the Federal government. In 1964, Saeed came into public limelight when he gave rogue criticism to Lieutenant-General Wajid Ali Khan Burki, then-Surgeon General of the Pakistan Army Medical Corps, who was a high-profile officer leading the then Ministry of Health under the government of Field Marshal Ayub Khan. Saeed criticized the General, saying, "General [Wajid] Burki used to say that Eastern medicine and homeopathy were quackery". Saeed began to write articles, organized conferences and lobbied hard for the Eastern medicine and Ayub Khan had to pass a law legalizing Eastern medicine, due to a fear of his government losing credibility among the people.

In 1985, Hakeem Mohammed Saeed founded Hamdard University, where he served as its first Vice-Chancellor and as a professor.

The crowning activity of his life is the establishment of Madinat-al-Hikmah campus in Karachi. It comprises Hamdard University with such institutes as Hamdard College of Medicine and Dentistry, Hamdard Al-Majeed College of Eastern Medicine, Hafiz Muhammad Ilyas Institute of Herbal Sciences, Hamdard Institute of Education & Social Sciences, Hamdard Institute of Management Sciences, Hamdard Institute of Information Technology, Hamdard School of Law, Faculty of Engineering Science & Technology, Hamdard Public School and Hamdard Village School. Bait-al-Hikmah (the library) is a constituent part of Madinat-al-Hikmah and one of the biggest and best-stocked libraries of Pakistan.

Saeed wrote, edited or compiled over 200 books and journals in Urdu and English on Islam, education, Pakistan, science, medicine, and health. Besides writing travelogues of countries he visited, he also wrote books especially for the youth and children. He also edited some journals such as Hamdard Islamicus, Hamdard Medicus, Journal of the Pakistan Historical Society "Historicus", Hamdard-e-Sehat, and Hamdard Naunehal. For several years he was also the editor of Payami, the Urdu edition of UNESCO'S journal Courier. Saeed participated in various international conferences on medicine, science, education and culture and travelled widely to many countries of the world. While in Pakistan, he organized numerous international and national conferences on topics of prime importance. Saeed created two widely attended national forums: Hamdard Shura (for leaders of public opinion) and Naunehal Assembly (for children). He held offices and memberships in dozens of national and international organizations related to education and healthcare. He launched two journals, Hamdard Medicus and Hamdard Islamicus. Hamdard-e-Sehat, which was already being published under his editorship since 1940, also appeared from Karachi in 1948. He launched a magazine for young readers, Hamdard Naunehal and established a separate division, Naunehal Adab, for producing quality books for children.

Saeed was an exponent of Eastern medicine who had treated patients from all over the world including Pakistan, Europe, Africa, and the Middle East by the time of his death in October 1998. He helped get alternative medicine recognized by the World Health Organization (WHO). After a fifty-year career as a practitioner of Greco-Arab medicine, he was posthumously awarded the Nishan-e-Imtiaz by the Government of Pakistan in 2002.

=== Books written ===
==== Islamic-related ====
1. Religion, Islamic Studies, Islamic Law, Education and Literature (in English)
2. Nuristan (Radio speeches on Quran-e-Hakim & our lives) (Published in 1987)
3. The Employer And the Employee: Islamic Concept (Published in 1972)
4. Islamic Concept of State (Published in 1983)
5. Essays on Islam (Four Volumes) (Published between 1992 and 1998)
6. Voice of Morality (Published in 1985)
7. Man, The World, Peace
8. Main Currents of Contemporary Thought In Pakistan (2 Volumes), History & Biography (in English) (Published in 1973)
9. Al-Biruni: His Time, Life And Works, Co-author: Dr. Ansar Zahid Khan (Published in 1981)
10. Personalities Noble (Published in 1983)
11. Road To Pakistan, Co-authors: Dr. Moin-ul-Haq, Prof. Sharif-ul-Mujahid, Dr. Ansar Zahid Khan (Published in 1990)

==== Medicine & History of Medicine ====
1. Al-Biruni's Book on Pharmacist And Material to Medica (Published in 1973)
2. Diseases of Liver: Greco-Arab Concepts (Published in 1982)
3. Cardiovascular Diseases: Greco-Arab Concepts (Published in 1983)
4. Hamdard Pharmacopoeia of Eastern Medicine (Published in 1969)
5. Oral Health (Published in 1994)
6. Medicine In China (Published in 1965)
7. Pharmacy and Medicine Thru The Ages (Published in 1969)
8. Traditional Greco-Arab And Modern Western Medicine: Conflict and Symbiosis (Published in 1975)
9. Pakistan Encyclopedia Planta Medica (2 Volumes), Co-authors: Dr. Viqar Uddin Ahmed & Dr. Atta-Ur-Rahman (Published in 1986)
10. Medicinal Herbal (2 volumes) (Published in 1996)
11. Background of Unani, Arabic & Islamic Medicine & Pharmacy (Published in 1997)
12. Ethics For Medics (Published in 1997)

==== Children's Literature ====
1. Love and Peace (Published in 1990)
2. Dostan (4 parts) Published in 1991
3. Let Us Talk Health (Published in 1989)
4. Peace Primer, Co-author F.A. Anvery (Published in 1991)
5. The Best of Goodness (Published in 1991)
6. The Greatest Man (Published in 1991)
7. A Primer of Health for Children of the World (Published in 1993)
8. A World without Polio – Children's thematic Poster Competition (Published in 1996)

== Personal life ==
In 1945, he married his cousin Naimat Begum in Delhi. They had one daughter, Sadia Rashid. He was the younger brother of the Hakim Abdul Hameed.

== Death and investigation ==
Saeed was murdered on 17 October 1998 in Aram Bagh area of Karachi. His murderers were caught by DIG Farooq Amin Qureshi, CCPO Karachi at that time. Qureshi was highly appreciated and is one of the most renowned police officers of Pakistan to this day. Several persons were arrested and subsequently sentenced to death by an anti-terrorism court.

In 2001, an anti-terrorism appellate bench of the Supreme Court of Pakistan acquitted all nine people accused of murdering Saeed. The verdict was challenged by the then provincial government. Muttahida Qaumi Movement (MQM) workers, Mohammed Amirullah, Mohammed Shakir alias Shakir Langra and Abu Imran Pasha, were among those acquitted by the court.

On 26 April 2014, the Supreme Court upheld the verdict of Sindh High Court (SHC) regarding acquittal of MQM workers in the Hakeem Saeed murder case.

== Legacy, awards and recognition ==
- Kuwait Prize for Tibb-i-Islami (Eastern medicine) in 1983
- Sitara-i-Imtiaz Award by the President of Pakistan in 1966
- Nishan-e-Imtiaz Award by the President of Pakistan in 2002
- Many prominent personalities of Lahore gathered at the Hamdard Center on his death anniversary in 2011, to pay tributes to him. Hakeem Saeed was portrayed as someone who had a multi-dimensional personality, a patriot of the highest order, and who is a role model for the youth as he set worthwhile examples of hard work, honesty and love for humanity.
