= Safi (medicine) =

Unani medicinal product

Safi is an Ayurvedic medicine which claims to be a blood-purifier. It is produced by Hamdard Laboratories (Waqf) in Ghaziabad India, as well as in Pakistan and in Bangladesh. According to the package, it "corrects the digestive system, relieves constipation, prevents and cures boils, pimples, and skin eruptions."

In August 2005 the Medicines and Healthcare products Regulatory Agency of the United Kingdom Department of Health reported that samples of Safi contained high levels of arsenic. The next month Health Canada issued a warning that Safi was "found to contain arsenic levels in excess of 40 times the maximum allowable concentration for drugs" and people who had used the product were told to contact their physician. The product had never been authorized for sale in Canada, but authorities suspect it may have been sold there, and had also been available for sale in USA. The product has subsequently been not allowed to enter Canada and Australia.
