= Hamdard Public College =

- হামদর্দ পাবলিক কলেজ
- Motto: শিক্ষায় অগ্রগতি,জ্ঞানে অগ্রগতি
- Motto in English: Promoting knowledge, Promoting Learning
- Type: Autonomous
- Established: 2010
- Founders: Hakim Md. Yousuf Harun Bhuiyan
- Parent institution: Hamdard Laboratories
- Chairman: Lieutenant General A. T. M. Zahirul Alam
- Principal: Md Nazrul Islam (Acting)
- Academic staff: 56
- Students: 1550
- Location: 151/8, Green Road, Panthapath (Panthapath Signal), Dhaka-1205; 23.750518°N 90.386810°E
- Campus: Urban
- Colours: Light Green Red White
- Nickname: HPC
- Website: hamdardpubliccollege.edu.bd

Hamdard Public College (Bengali: হামদর্দ পাবলিক কলেজ), also known as HPC, is a private higher secondary educational institution located at Dhanmondi, Dhaka, Bangladesh. It was established in 2010.

== History ==
Hamdard Public College was founded in 2010 by Hakim Md Yusuf Haroon Bhuiyan, managing director and chief mutawalli (administrator) of the Hamdard Laboratories (Waqf), a charitable endowment.

== Achievements ==
In 2014, it placed 19th among colleges under the Board of Intermediate and Secondary Education, Dhaka, in Higher Secondary School Certificate (HSC) exam results. The college had a 100% pass rate in the HSC exams in 2015 and 2016.

In the 2011–12 academic year, out of a total of 93 students, 92 passed. 50 students get a GPA-5. From this batch, 19 students got a chance in different universities including Dhaka Medical College, Dhaka University, Rajshahi University of Engineering and Technology.

At the Dhaka Division "Bangladesh Botany Olympiad 2018", in competition with 20 other education institutions, the college captured 9 out of 10 prizes outright, and shared the tenth prize.

== Administration ==
The college is run by Hamdard University Bangladesh and is an affiliate of three educational institutions namely Hakim Saeed Eastern Medical College and Hospital, Hamdard Unani Medical College and Hospital, Raushan Jahan Eastern Medical College and Hospital.
