= Unani medicine =

South Asian Greco-Arabic traditional medicine

Alternative medicine
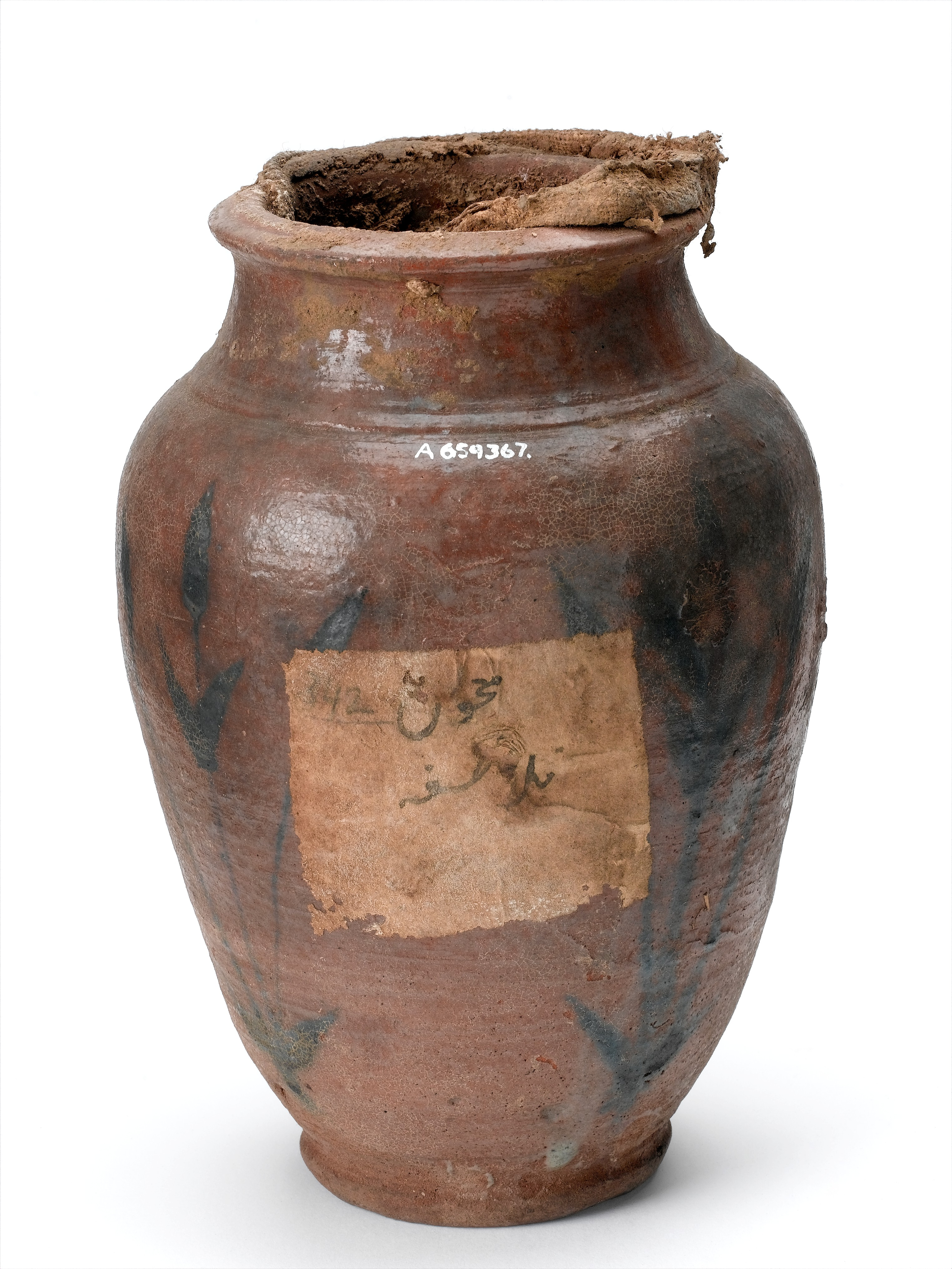
- Classification: Traditional medicine
- Modality: Herbal medicine (or herbal pharmacotherapy), cupping therapy, regimental therapy (e.g. massage therapy, exercise), and surgical intervention
- Claims: Health is maintained through the balance of four bodily humors, using a holistic approach of treatment.
- Related fields: Ancient Greek medicine, Iranian traditional medicine, Ayurveda, Sowa Rigpa
- Original proponents: Hippocrates, Galen, Ibn Sina (Avicenna)
- Culture: South Asia

Unani medicine or Unani Tibb (Urdu: طب یونانی tibb-i-yūnānī) is a Greco-Arabic traditional medicine system practiced in areas of South Asia and Central Asia. Unani medicine uses the humoral theory of diagnosis, which predates the discovery of microbes and modern medicine. Unani medicine and these theories are regarded as pseudoscientific.

The term Yūnānī means 'Greek', referring to the fact that the Greco-Arabic system of medicine was based on the teachings of the Greek physicians Hippocrates and Galen.

The Hellenistic origin of Unani medicine is still visible in its being based on the classical four humours: phlegm (balgham), blood (dam), yellow bile (ṣafrā) and black bile (saudā), but it has also been influenced by Indian and Chinese traditional systems.

== Etymology ==
The term Unani dates back to the ancient Greek place-name Ἰωνία (Iōnía), a coastal region on the eastern Aegean. The Ionians were the major ethnic group of the region, and their name became the primary Arabic and Persian reference for Greece as a civilization, known as Yūnānistan.

== History ==
=== Ancient Greece (1200 BC – 600 AD) ===
Chart of humoral theory

Unani medicine established its foundations in ancient Greece. Hippocrates (c. 460–380 BCE) constructed the four-humor framework (blood (dam), phlegm (balg), yellow bile (safra), and black bile (sawda)), attributing the cause of disease to an imbalance of internal humoral and bodily composition.

Galen of Pergamon (born c. 129 CE) continued to elevate this humoral theory, contributing theories such as breath (pneuma) and "The Four Faculties of a living organism", consolidating the theoretical diagnostic structure that Unani Medicine would be built upon.

=== Islamic Golden Age (786–1258) ===
During the Islamic Golden Age (8th–14th centuries), Caliphs Harun Rashid and Al-Mansur commissioned Arabic translations of Greek and Sanskrit medical works via the Bayt al-Hikma (House of Wisdom) in Baghdad. Al-Razi (c. 854–925 CE) built upon this information, producing the Kitab al-Hawi (The Comprehensive Book), one of the largest medical encyclopedias of the medieval world which contained important clinical contributions, including the first recorded distinction between smallpox and measles.

Following this, Ibn Sina (or Avicenna, 980–1037 CE) synthesized the vast medical knowledge into the Kitab al-Qanun fi al-tibb (The law of Medicine), finishing it in Hamadan, where he died in 1037 CE. The Kitab al-Qanun fi al-tibb is a set of five large texts, which remained a foundational medical reference in both Arab and European institutions for centuries after. Ibn Rushd (or Averroes, 1126–1198 CE) later produced the Kitab al-Kulliyyat fi al-Tibb (Colliget), a theoretical framework for Unani medicine that extended its reach westward into Al-Andalus.

=== Mughal period (1526–1857) ===
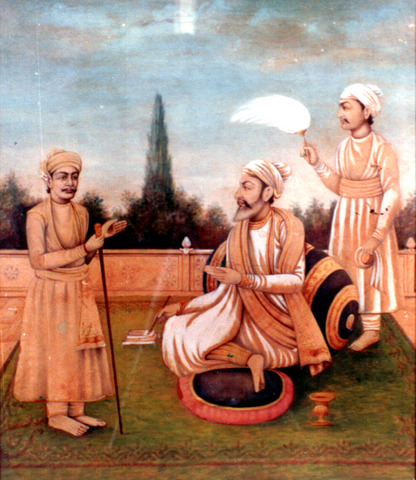
Depiction of Hakim Muhammad Sharif Khan

Unani arrived in India by the 12th century, carried by Muslim scholars and grew its influence during court patronage throughout the Delhi Sultanate and the Mughal Empire. When the Mongols invaded Persia and Central Asia, many Unani Hakims (physicians) were displaced, fleeing to India where some were appointed as court physicians. Furthermore, Emperors Akbar (r. 1556–1605), Shah Jahan (r. 1628–1658), and Aurangzeb (r. 1658–1707) commissioned translations of Persian medical texts, enriching the medical practices and knowledge in the Mughal Empire.

One large document, the Ilajat-I Dara Shikohi ('Ilājāt-i Dārā Šikōhī), is one of the largest written Persian medical manuals composed in Mughal India. This document, written by Nur al-Din Shirazi (Nūr al-Dīn Šīrāzī), compiled both Muslim and Indian medical arts and gave a vast overview of the knowledge circulating among Muslim physicians in the Mughal Empire. From the 18th century, Unani acquired a distinctly Indian character. The pharmacopoeia began using local herbs and minerals and the system of medicine passed down family-lineages, entering the vernacular literature.

=== British colonial period (1858–1947) ===
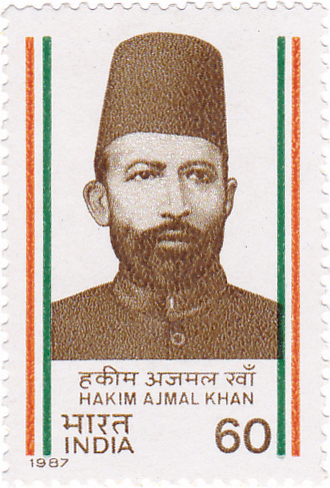
Hakim Ajmal Khan as depicted on an Indian stamp

During British rule, Western medicine (referred to as doctory) was prioritized over traditional systems throughout the sub-continent, leading to a decline of traditional medical systems in British India. The dominant response and critique to Western medicine were Unani reformists who advocated for the legitimacy and retention of the Unani Tibb, considering it a distinct form of knowledge separate from Western medicine. Although they criticized the Western medical dominance, reformists emphasized adopting processes like the scientific method to Unani medical research.

In 1883, Hakim Abdul Majeed established the Madrasa Tibbia (now Tibbia College) in New Delhi, as an institutional response to the suppression of indigenous medical systems under British rule. Hakim Ajmal Khan (1868–1927) continued to expand this institution, using it as a platform to resist a proposed British ban on indigenous medicine.

=== Post-colonial period (1948 – current) ===
Following Indian independence in 1947, Unani, among other traditional medicine systems, gained formal governmental recognition after their colonial marginalization. The Majeedi family of Delhi made significant contributions toward the modernization of the Unani drug industry during this time. Particularly, Hakim Abdul Hameed (1908–1999) establishing the Institute of History of Medicine and Medical Research (IHMMR) in New Delhi in 1962, which developed into the Jamia Hamdard (deemed to be university) in 1989.

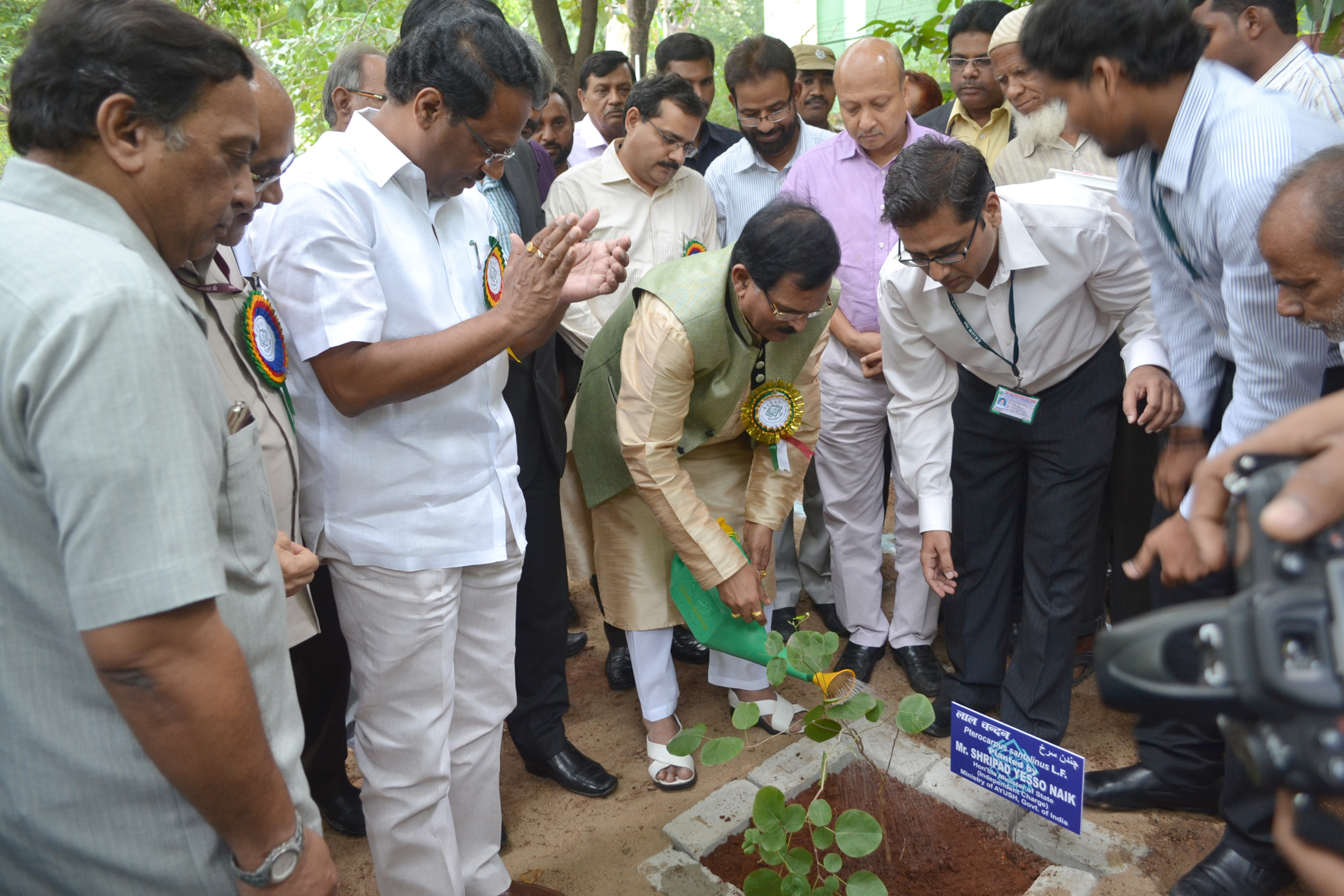
The Minister of State for AYUSH, Shripad Yesso Naik planting a sapling at Central Research Institute of Unani Medicine, in Hyderabad (September 30, 2015)

The Indian government identified the need for standardization of indigenous medicine systems, culminating in the Indian Medicine Central Council Act of 1970, which established the Central Council of Indian Medicine (CCIM, succeeded by National Commission for Indian System of Medicine (NCISM) as the statutory body for maintaining uniform educational standards across Unani, Ayurveda, and Siddha programs nationally.

The Central Council for Research in Unani Medicine (CCRUM), established in March 1978, serves as the apex government body coordinating scientific research into Unani pharmacology, clinical practice, and drug standardization. In 2014, the Government of India elevated the Department of AYUSH into a full ministry, formally situating Unani within the national health infrastructure of India (alongside Ayurveda, Yoga, Siddha, and Homeopathy). Established in 1984, the National Institute of Unani Medicine (NIUM) in Bengaluru serves as a pinnacle institution for postgraduate Unani education and research in India.

== Education and regulation ==
=== India ===
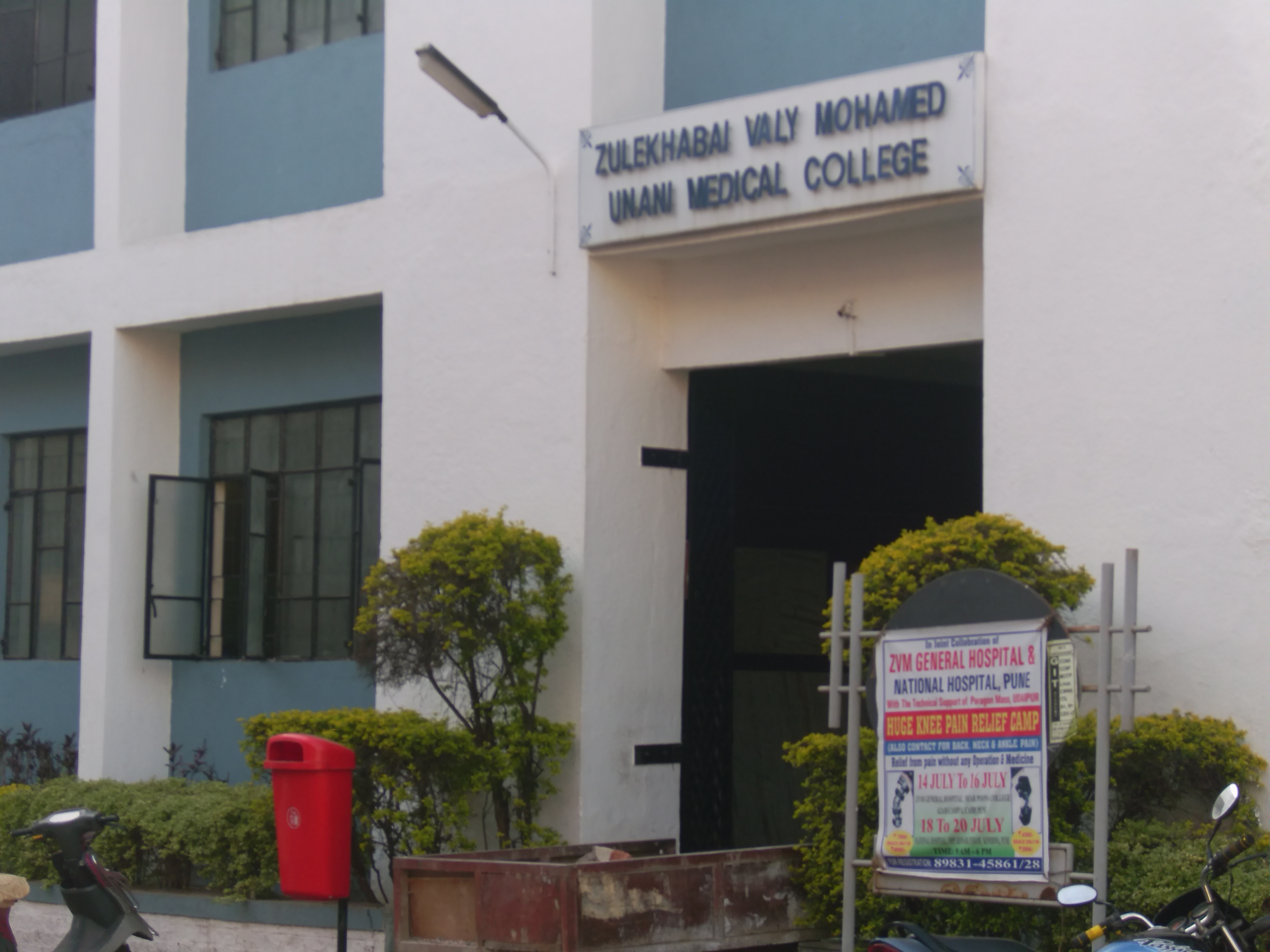
Z.V.M. Unani Medical College in Pune

India hosts fifty-seven Unani medical colleges as of 2022, with the registered Unani medical practitioner base reaching an estimated 52,000 individuals as of 2024. The common undergraduate degree awarded on completion on an Unani medicine program is titled Bachelor of Unani Medicine and Surgery (B.U.M.S.), although the name of this degree may vary slightly across institutions.

Postgraduate education in Unani medicine remains less widespread than undergraduate offerings, with a few colleges currently offering MD (Unani medicine) or PhD programs. Postgraduate studies in Unani medicine can range in disciplines, a few being: Mu'ālajāt (Medicine/Therapeutics), 'Ilm al-Adwiya (Pharmacology or Pharmacognosy), 'Ilm al-Saidla (Unani Pharmacy), among others.

The Central Council of Indian Medicine (CCIM), a statutory body established in 1971 under the Department of Ayurveda, Yoga and Naturopathy, Unani, Siddha and Homoeopathy (AYUSH), monitors higher education in areas of Indian medicine including Ayurveda, Unani, and other traditional medical systems. Another subdivision of AYUSH, the Central Council for Research in Unani Medicine (CCRUM), aids and co-ordinates scientific research in the Unani system of medicine through a network of 22 nationwide research institutes and units.

To fight biopiracy and unethical patents, the Government of India set up the Traditional Knowledge Digital Library in 2001 as repository of formulations used in Indian traditional medicine, including 98,700 Unani formulations.

=== Pakistan ===
Pakistan maintains one of the largest active infrastructures for Unani education, clinical practice programs, and product manufacturing in Unani medicine. The estimated figure of registered Tabibs (or hakims) in Pakistan is up to 60,000 individuals who have obtained either diploma in Tibb-e-Unani or a bachelor degree in Unani medicine. The Bachelor of Eastern Medicine and Surgery (B.E.M.S.) is the undergraduate, six-year program (five years of study and one year house job) that formally prepares the student in Unani medicine practice.

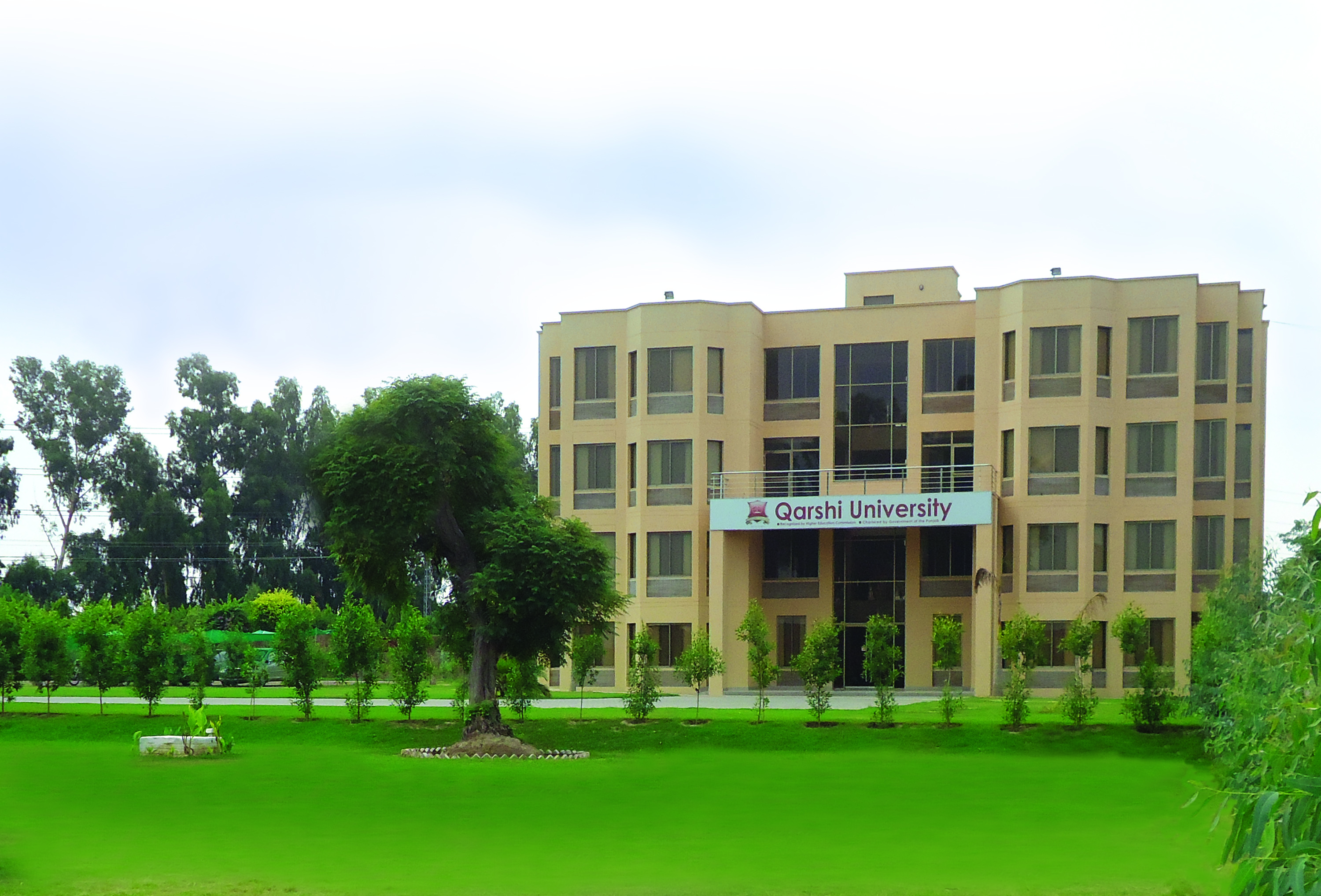
Qarshi University, Lahore, Punjab, Pakistan

There are ~40 institutions in Pakistan that provide education in Unani medicine. Level of education can vary amongst diploma programs, such as the Fazil-e-Tibb-o-Jarahat diploma (FTJ), to postgraduate degrees in Unani medicine. Postgraduate education is predominately offered by the Faculty of Eastern Medicine at Hamdard University, which offers MPhil and PhD programs in Unani medicine (specializing in research oriented education).

The National Council for Tibb (NCT) is a corporate regulating body, established under Section 3 of the Unani, Ayurvedic and Homoeopathic Practitioners Act of 1965, operating under the administrative control of the Ministry of National Health Services, Regulations and Coordination in Islamabad. The NCT oversees the, education, registration, monitoring of institutions and individuals, who wish to practice or provide education in Unani medicine.

There are private institutions who devote themselves to the research and production of Unani medicines, including the Hamdard Foundation, which also runs an Unani research institution. The Qarshi Foundation runs a similar institution, Qarshi University. The programs are accredited by Higher Education Commission, Pakistan Medical and Dental Council, and the Pakistan Pharmacy Council.

== Criticism and safety issues ==
Some medicines traditionally used by Unani practitioners are known to be poisonous.

The Indian Journal of Pharmacology notes:

- According to WHO, "Pharmacovigilance activities are done to monitor detection, assessment, understanding and prevention of any obnoxious adverse reactions to drugs at therapeutic concentration that is used or is intended to be used to modify or explore physiological system or pathological states for the benefit of recipient."
- These drugs may be any substance or product, including herbs and minerals for animals and human beings, and can even be that prescribed by practitioners of Unani or Ayurvedic system of medicine. In recent days, there is awareness related to safety and adverse drug reaction monitoring of herbal drugs including Unani drugs.
- The Indian Medical Association describes Unani, Ayurvedic, Siddha practitioners who practice medicine without having right qualifications and prescribing allopathic medicines as quacks.

== See also ==
- Ancient Greek medicine
- Ayurveda
- Cupping therapy
- Herbal medicine
- Iranian traditional medicine
- Sowa Rigpa
- Traditional Chinese medicine
