= Hamdard University Bangladesh =

Coordinates: 23.6152°N 90.6102°E

Hamdard University Bangladesh হামদর্দ বিশ্ববিদ্যালয় বাংলাদেশ
- Type: Private
- Established: 2012
- Chancellor: President Mohammed Shahabuddin
- Vice-Chancellor: Faruque-Uz-Zaman Chowdhury
- Location: Hamdard, Gazaria Upazila, Munshiganj District, Bangladesh
- Campus: Urban 0.75 acres (0.30 ha) (present campus) 275 acres (111 ha) (permanent campus)
- Website: hamdarduniversity.edu.bd

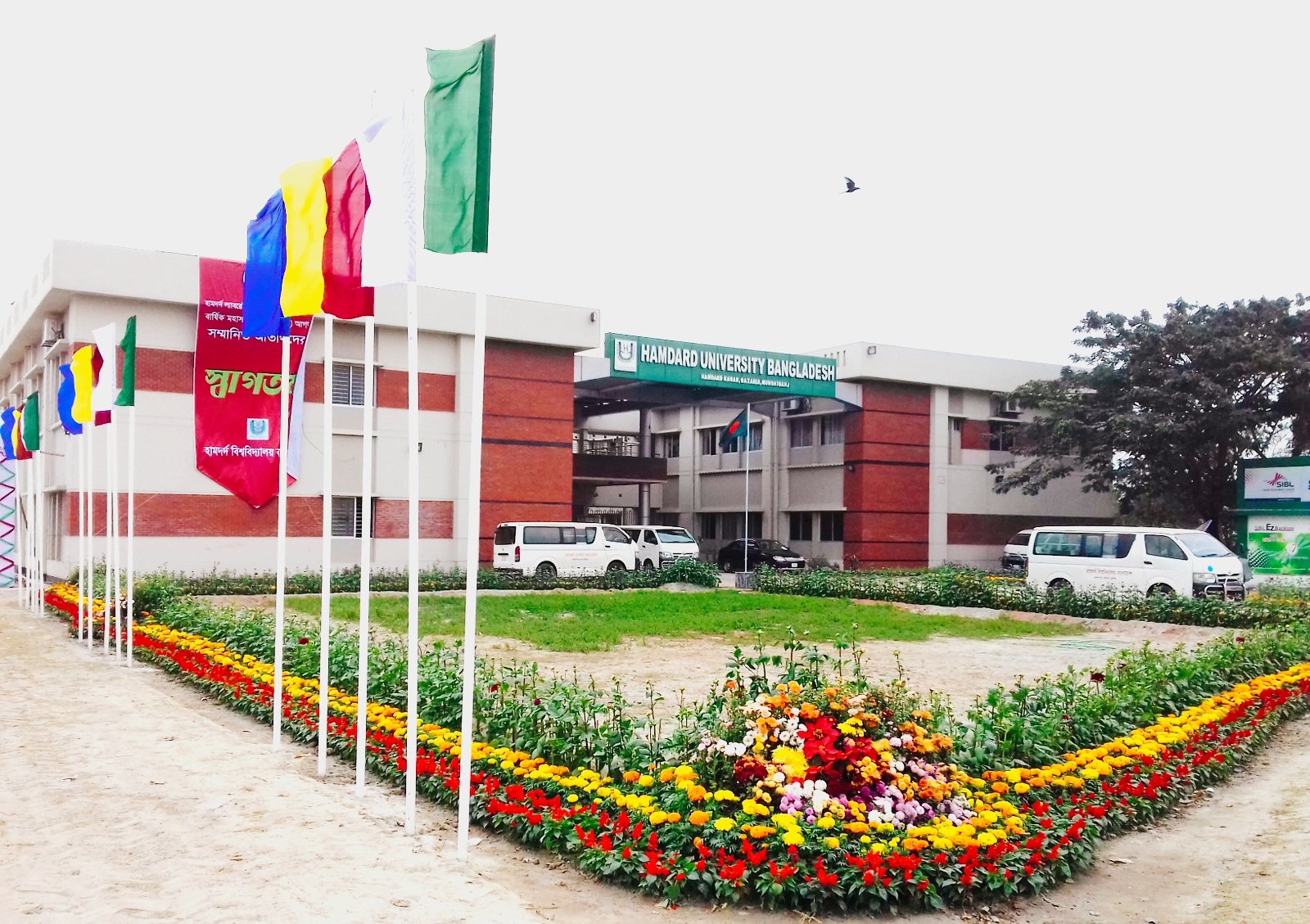
Hamdard University Bangladesh Campus Building 1

Hamdard University Bangladesh (Bengali: হামদর্দ বিশ্ববিদ্যালয় বাংলাদেশ) is a newly established private university in Bangladesh.

== Academic departments ==
Faculty of Science, Engineering & Technology (FSET)

- Dept. of Mathematics
- Dept. of Electrical and Electronic Engineering
- Dept. of Computer Science and Engineering

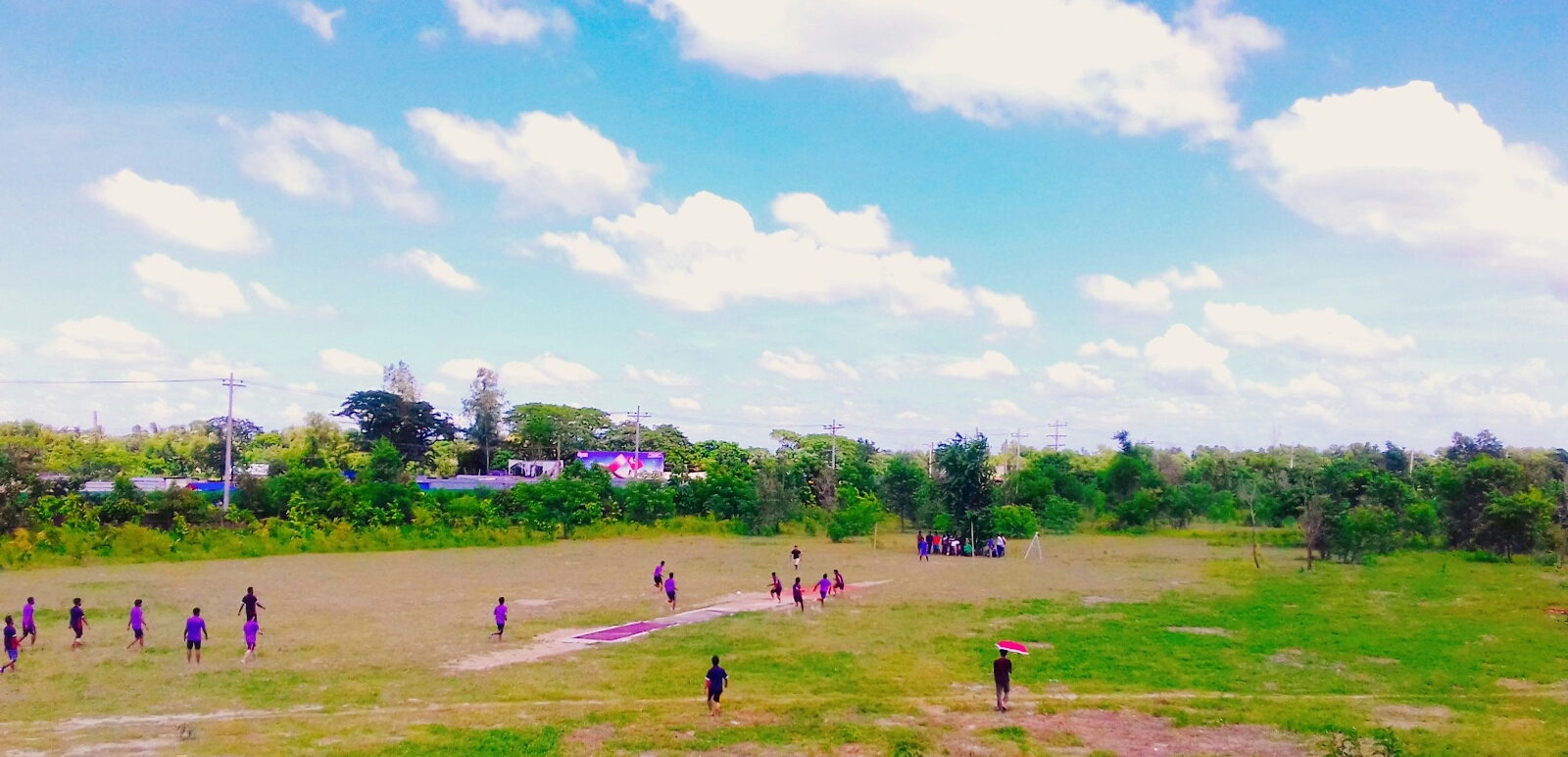
Hamdard University Bangladesh Campus

Faculty of Business Administration(FBA)

- Dept. of Business Administration (major in marketing, management, finance, accounting)

Faculty of Arts & Social Science(FASS)

- Dept. of English
- Dept. of Economics

Faculty of Unani and Ayurvedic Medicine (FAUM)

- Dept. of Unani Medicine
- Dept. of Ayurvedic Medicine

Faculty of Health Sciences

- Dept. of Public Health

== Courses ==
=== Undergraduate ===
- Bachelor of Science (Honours) in Mathematics
- Bachelor of Science (Honours) in Computer Science & Engineering
- Bachelor of Science (Honours) in Electrical & Electronics Engineering
- Bachelor of Business Administration (major in marketing)
- Bachelor of Business Administration (Management)
- Bachelor of Arts (Honours) in English
- Bachelor of Social Science (Honours) in Economics
- Bachelor of Unani Medicine and Surgery (BUMS)
- Bachelor of Ayurvedic Medicine and Surgery (BAMS)

=== Graduate ===
- Master of Business Administration (MBA) Regular-39 credit
- Master of Business Administration (MBA) Regular-66 credit
- Executive MBA (EMBA)-Management
- Master of Public Health (MPH)
- Master of Science in Mathematics

== See also ==
- Hamdard Public College
- Jamia Hamdard
- Hamdard Public School
