= Jamia Hamdard =

Deemed to be University in New Delhi, India

- Former name: Hamdard Tibbi College (1963–1989)
- Motto: The Book And Wisdom
- Type: Deemed
- Established: 1963; 63 years ago
- Founder: Hakim Abdul Hameed
- Affiliations: UGC
- Chancellor: Hammad Ahmed
- Vice-Chancellor: Dr. M. Afshar Alam
- Location: South Delhi, Delhi, 110062, India
- Campus: Urban
- Nickname: Hamdard
- Website: jamiahamdard.ac.in

Jamia Hamdard is an institute of higher education deemed to be university located in Delhi, India. Founded in 1963 as Hamdard Tibbi College by Hakim Abdul Hameed, it was given the status of deemed to be university in 1989. Its origins can be traced back to a clinic specializing in Unani medicine that was set up in Delhi in 1906 by Hakeem Hafiz Abdul Majeed. It has its jurisdiction over New Delhi.

== Campus ==
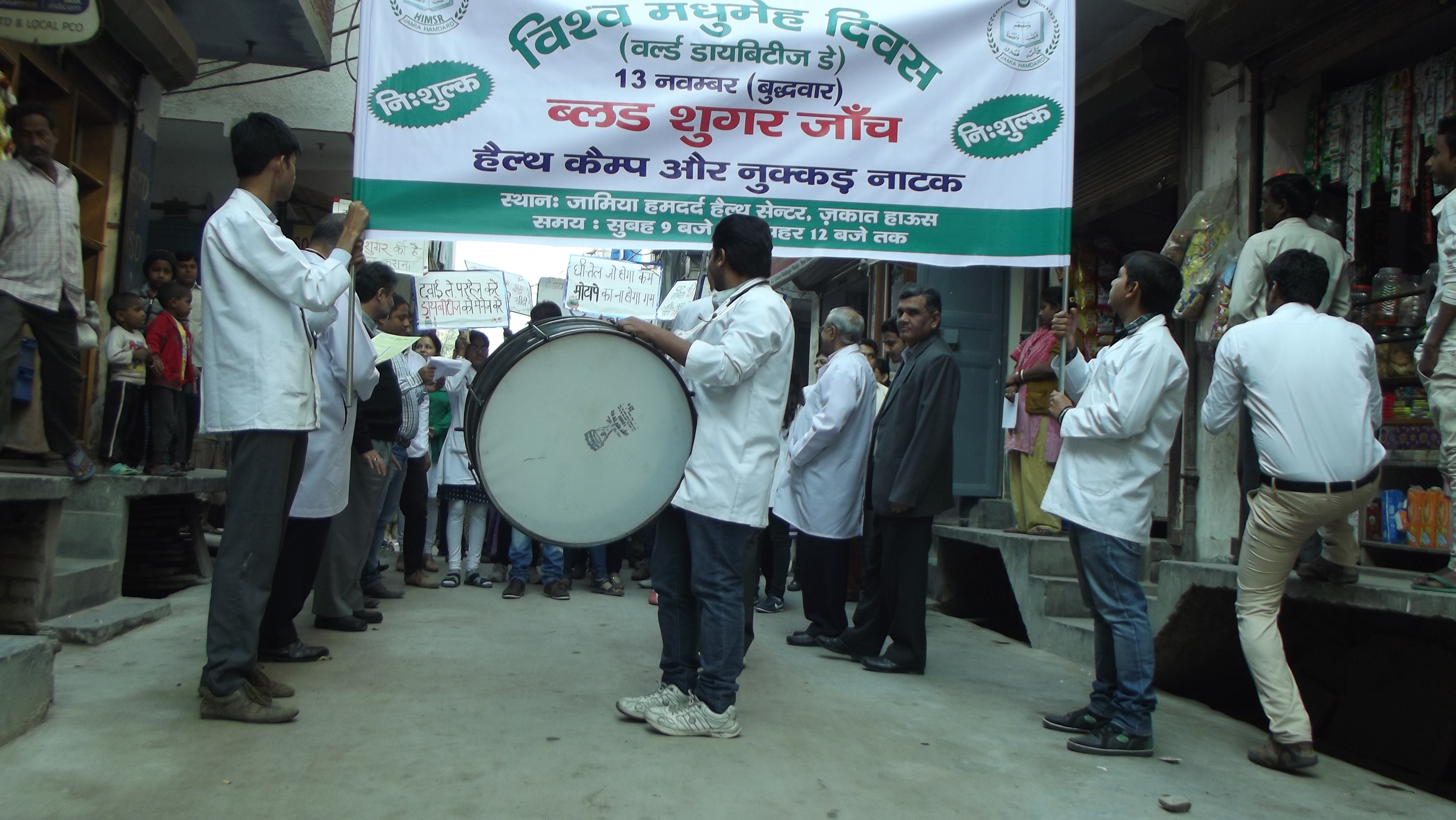
Medical students celebrating Diabetes Day

=== Library ===
The library system consists of a central library and six faculty libraries: the faculties of science, medicine, pharmacy, nursing, Islamic studies, and management studies and information technology. The central library is named ‘Hakim Mohammed Said Central Library’, after the younger brother of the founder. He also founded Hamdard University in Pakistan.

With the efforts of Sayyid Ausaf Ali (The pioneer Director), Hakim Abdul Hamid, Public Relations Director Mr Muhsin Ahmad Dadarkar, the university became a deemed University.

It took more than ten years of constant follow up with Education Ministry that the Hamdad Institute was recognized as a full fledged University under the banner of Jamia Hamdard.

The library has a manuscript division which has many original Arabic documents including a rare copy of the Holy Quran.

=== Computer centre ===
The university has a computer centre which serves as a lab for the Department of Computer Science, containing computing facilities, system analysis units, and all necessary peripherals and requisite software. There are five laboratories in the computer centre, with facilities for their respective development fields.

=== Scholars' House ===
The Scholars' House is a guest house for scholars, university guests, outside examiners, members of the selection board, and residential conferences.

It has 12 double-bed rooms, 27 single-bed rooms, and 4 flats.

=== Convention Centre ===
The university has a convention centre seating 200.

=== Faculties ===
Schools of Studies:

- Pharmacy: The School of Pharmaceutical Education and Research (erstwhile Faculty of Pharmacy) is one of the oldest pharmacy institutes in India. It was awarded the number one rank in India in the year 2017, 2019, 2020, 2021 and 2022 by the Ministry of Human Resource Development, Government of India via its National Institute Ranking Framework. The school offers diploma, undergraduate, graduate and Ph.D. programs in pharmacy and pharmaceutical sciences. The institute is research intensive and has numerous notable alumni in the pharmaceutical industry in both India and abroad. The School retained its top position amongst Indian Pharmacy Colleges for the year 2022 in NIRF rankings.
- Hamdard Institute of Legal Studies and Research: which offers BA.LLB(5 years integrated course) for undergraduates.
- Interdisciplinary Sciences and Technology: which offers the Food technology program for undergraduate and postgraduate students
- Management Studies & Information Technology
- Engineering Sciences and technology
- Hamdard Institute of Medical Sciences and Research ( HIMSR ) & Associated Hakeem Abdul Hameed Centenary Hospital
- School of Unani Medical Education and Research (Unani)
- School of Nursing and Allied Health Sciences
- Islamic Studies & Social Sciences.
- Jamia Hamdard Residential Coaching Academy(JHRCA)
- Science
  - Biotechnology
  - Biochemistry
  - Botany
  - Toxicology
  - Chemistry
  - Clinical Research.

=== Central Instrumentation Facility (CIF) ===
Central Instrumentation Facility was established in the Faculty of Pharmacy in July 1990 with the installation of L7 Backman Ultra-centrifuge, Sorval Rt-6000 low-speed centrifuge, DU-64 Backman UV-VIS Spectrometer, Perkin-Elmer 8700 Gas Chromatograph, Perkin-Elmer HPLC and Mettler electronic balance. In the year 1992, gamma-counter, beta-counter and DNA Electrophoresis systems were added to the CIF. Perkin-Elmer Lambda-20 Double-beam UV-VIS spectrophotometer, Perkin-Elmer LS-50 luminescence spectrometer, Bio-rad FT-IR spectrometers and mini-computer facility comprising eight computers, Internet and e-mail facilities are also available in CIF.

The objective of CIF is to provide an instrumentation facility to the researchers of Jamia Hamdard, in addition, to train the Ph.D. and M.Pharm/M.Sc. students on various equipment. Jamia Hamdard research students operate instruments themselves for their experiments. Ph.D. students, use CIF during late hours and on weekends to complete their experiments. Several M.Pharm. and Ph.D. scholars have used the CIF for their research.

=== Hamdard Institute of Medical Sciences and Research (HIMSR) & Hakim Abdul Hameed Centenary Hospital ===
Hamdard Institute of Medical Sciences and Research (HIMSR) and Associated Hakeem Abdul Hameed Centenary Hospital is a private medical school and a teaching hospital in Delhi, India. Established in 2012, it is affiliated to Jamia Hamdard. It offers undergraduate, postgraduate and post-doctoral courses in medical subjects and is ranked among the most prestigious medical schools in India.

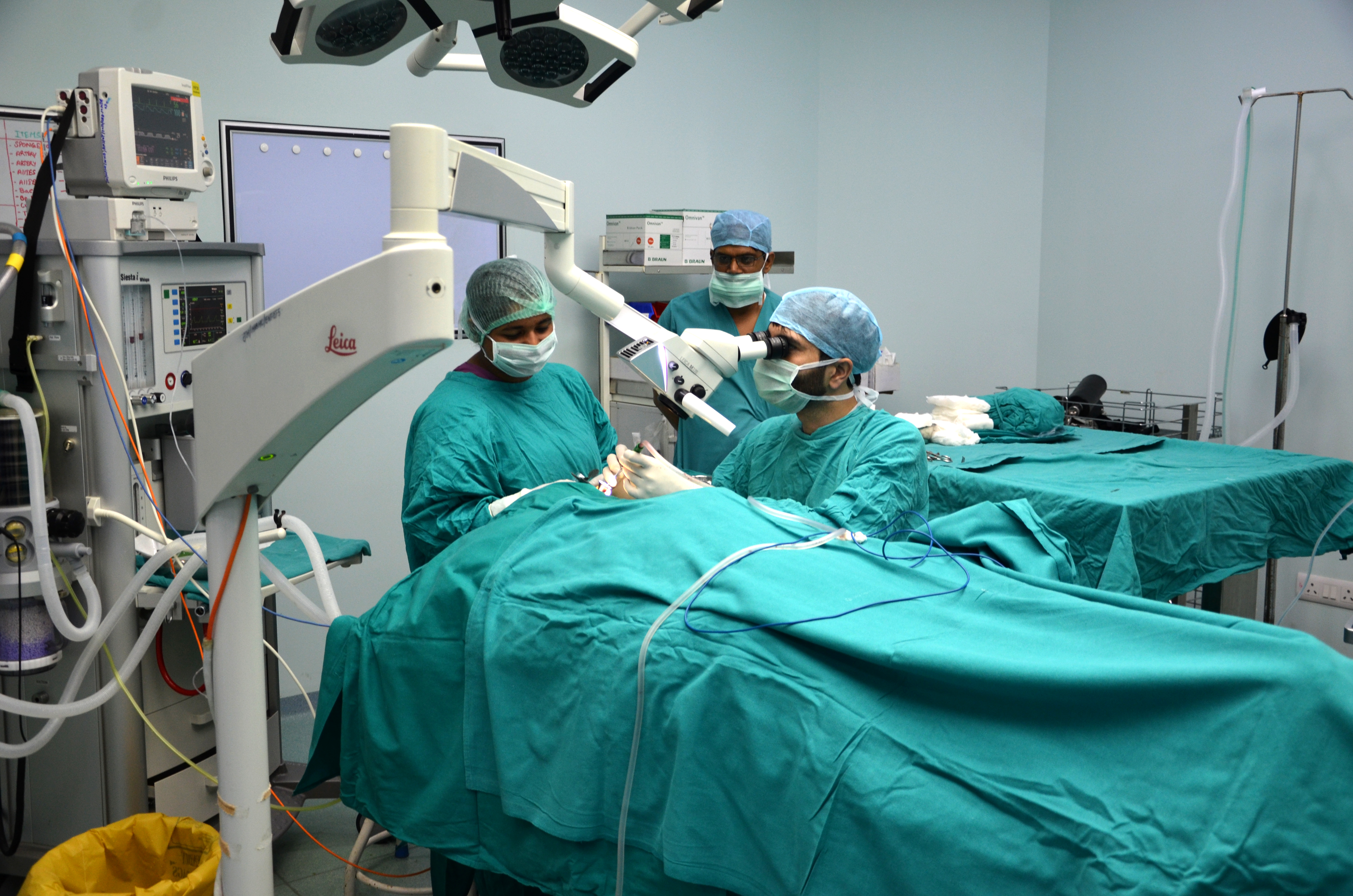
A depiction of Operation Theatre at HAHC Hospital

It was established through a resolution adopted by the Executive Council of Jamia Hamdard in its 60th meeting held in March 2010. In June 2012, the Medical Council of India approved the intake of students for the academic year 2012-13 and the institute graduated its first batch of MBBS students in 2017. The Hakeem Abdul Hameed Centenary Hospital (originally Majeedia Hospital) was subsequently attached to the institute, whose current building was inaugurated in 2016.

HIMSR was one of the several medical colleges that opposed the Supreme Court of India ruling to replace the Medical Council of India with the National Medical Commission in 2017 and asked for the extension of the oversight committee's tenure by a year.

In 2020, Hamdard Laboratories announced that it is planning to conduct clinical trial of its immunity booster medicines to assess their effectiveness against COVID-19. In 2021, Serum Institute of India selected Hamdard Institute of Medical Sciences and Research as one of the clinical trial sites for Covovax COVID-19 vaccine.

== Departments and courses offered ==
Hamdard Institute of Medical Sciences and Research has 24 departments.

=== Undergraduate courses ===
- Bachelor of Medicine, Bachelor of Surgery (MBBS)

=== Post graduate courses ===
- Department of Anaesthesia
  - MD/MS Anesthesia
- Department of Anatomy
  - MSc Medical Anatomy
  - MS/ MD Anatomy
- Department of Biochemistry
  - MSc Medical Biochemistry
  - Ph.D. Medical Biochemistry
- Department of Central Skill Lab
  - MSc Central Skill Lab
- Department of Community Medicine
  - Master of Public Health
  - MD Community Medicine
  - Ph.D. Public Health
- Department of Dentistry
  - MDS Dentistry
- Department of Dermatology
  - MD Dermatology
- Department of Emergency Medicine
- Department of ENT & Head And Neck Surgery
  - MD/MS E.N.T
- Department of Forensic Medicine and Toxicology
  - MD Forensic Medicine
- Department of Medical Education Unit
- Department of Medicine
  - Ph.D. Medicine
- Department of Microbiology
  - MSc Medical Microbiology
  - Ph.D. Medical Microbiology
- Department of Obstetrics and Gynecology
  - MD/MS Obst. & Gynae
- Department of Ophthalmology
  - MD/MS Ophthalmology
- Department of Orthopedics
  - MD/MS Orthopedics
- Department of Paediatrics
  - MD/MS Pediatrics
- Department of Pathology
  - MD Pathology
  - Ph.D. Pathology
- Department of Pharmacology
  - MSc Medical Pharmacology
  - Ph.D. Pharmacology
- Department of Physiology
  - MSc Medical Physiology
  - Ph.D. Medical Physiology
- Department of Psychiatry
- Department of Radio-Diagnosis
  - MD/MS Radio-Diagnosis
- Department of Respiratory Medicine
- Department of Surgery
  - MS General Surgery

The institute conducts research in cancer, diabetes and cardiovascular diseases. The Institute started a one-year postgraduate diploma in Preventive Cardiology in collaboration with All India Heart Foundation and the National Heart Institute, New Delhi. The Hamdard Imaging Centre has been established to provide medical imaging under one roof. Free OPD facilities are provided to University students, teaching and non-teaching staff, their family members and very poor people.

=== Distance education ===
The School of Open and Distance Learning (SODL) of Jamia Hamdard was established in 2004. It offers undergraduate degrees in business administration, computer application and commerce.

== Academics ==
=== Academic programmes ===
The university offers graduate and post-graduate programs in Modern Medicine, Unani Medicine, Nursing, Pharmacy, Chemical and Life Sciences, Law, Information Technology, Computer Applications, Business Management, Islamic Studies, Human Rights, federal studies, Paramedical Sciences, Physiotherapy, Occupational Therapy, Journalism and Media.

It recently launched a new course in Medical Virology to cater to demands for trained virologists in India in Covid Times.

=== Rankings ===
University and college rankings

General – international
- QS (World) (2023): 1201–1400
- QS (Asia) (2023): 451–500
- Times (World) (2023): 601–800
- Times (Asia) (2022): 301–350
- Times (Emerging) (2022): 351–400

General – India
- NIRF (Overall) (2023): 78
- NIRF (Universities) (2023): 49

Medical – India
- NIRF (2023): 29

Pharmacy – India
- NIRF (2023): 2

Internationally, Jamia Hamdard was ranked 1201–1400 in the QS World University Rankings of 2023 and 451–500 in Asia. It was ranked 601–800 in the world by the Times Higher Education World University Rankings of 2023, 301–350 in Asia in 2022 and 351–400 among emerging economies.

In India, it was ranked 78th overall by the National Institutional Ranking Framework (NIRF) in 2020, 49th among universities, 29th in the medical ranking and second in the pharmacy ranking.

== Alumni ==
- Muhammadullah Khalili Qasmi, Islamic scholar
- Wali Rahmani (influencer)

== See also ==
- List of Islamic educational institutions
- Hamdard University Bangladesh
- Hamdard University Pakistan
