= Bayt al-hikmah =

Bayt al-hikmah ("chamber of wisdom") may refer to:

- Bayt al-hikmah, a library begun in Syria by caliph Mu'awiya I
- Bayt al-Hikmah or the House of Wisdom, a library and translation institute established in Abbasid-era Baghdad, Iraq
