= Islamic Golden Age =

Period of cultural flourishing from 786 to 1258

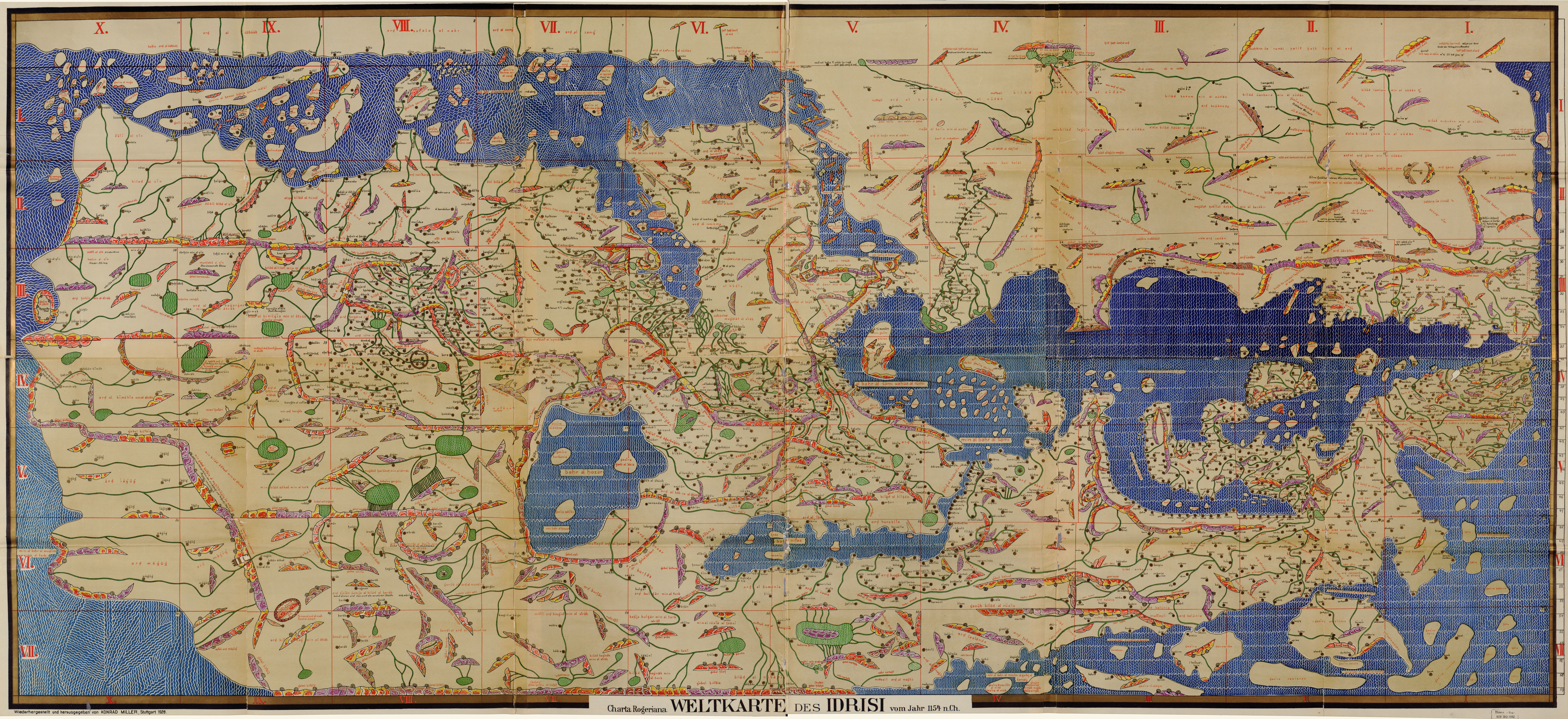
- The Tabula Rogeriana (1154) by al-Idrisi, one of the most advanced medieval world maps.

Overview
- Era: Middle Ages
- Dates: c. 8th century – c. 14th/16th century
- Core regions: West Asia, North Africa, Al-Andalus, Central Asia, East Africa

Milestones
- Key centers: Baghdad (House of Wisdom), Bukhara, Cairo, Córdoba, Damascus, Samarkand, Fez, Tlemcen
- Movements: Arabic and Latin translation movements, Empiricism, Islamic philosophy

Intellectual achievements
- Mathematics: Algebra, spherical trigonometry, Arabic numerals
- Medicine: The Canon of Medicine, discovery of pulmonary circulation, Ophthalmology
- Astronomy: Astrolabe refinement, Maragheh observatory
- Physics: Book of Optics, Hydrostatics

End
- Key events: Siege of Baghdad (1258), Reconquista, Black Death, economic shifts
- Part of a series on the History of Islam

The Islamic Golden Age was a period of cultural flourishing in the history of Islam, dated from the 8th century CE to the 14th century. (Note: In the Islamic calendar, it lasted from the 1st to 7th centuries AH.) The period is understood to have begun during the reign of the Abbasid caliph Harun al-Rashid (786–809), with the establishment of the House of Wisdom in Baghdad, one of the world's largest cities at the time. The institution attracted scholars from across the Muslim world to translate the classical knowledge of the known world into Arabic. In addition to Baghdad, the intellectual and cultural activity also flourished in other urban centers of the medieval Islamic world, including Cairo, and Umayyad Córdoba (capital of Al-Andalus), as well as Damascus, Nishapur, Samarkand, Ghazni, Kairouan, and Fez, and in later centuries, Nasrid Granada.

The period is said to have ended with the collapse of the Abbasid caliphate following the Mongol invasions and the Siege of Baghdad in 1258. Select scholars extend the end of the golden age to around 1350, thereby including the Timurid Renaissance. Others extend it to the 15th century, including the Nasrid Kingdom of Granada, whose court remained an important centre of scholarship, culture and literature, or even to the 16th century, incorporating the rise of the Islamic gunpowder empires.

== History of concepts ==
The metaphor of a golden age began to be applied in 19th-century literature about Islamic history, in the context of the western aesthetic fashion known as Orientalism. The author of a Handbook for Travelers in Syria and Palestine in 1868 observed that the most beautiful mosques of Damascus were "like Mohammedanism itself, now rapidly decaying" and relics of "the golden age of Islam".

There is no unambiguous definition of the term, and depending on whether it is used with a focus on cultural or on military achievement, it may be taken to refer to rather disparate time spans. Thus, one 19th century author would have it extend to the duration of the caliphate, or to "six and a half centuries", while another would have it end after only a few decades of Rashidun conquests, with the death of Umar and the First Fitna.

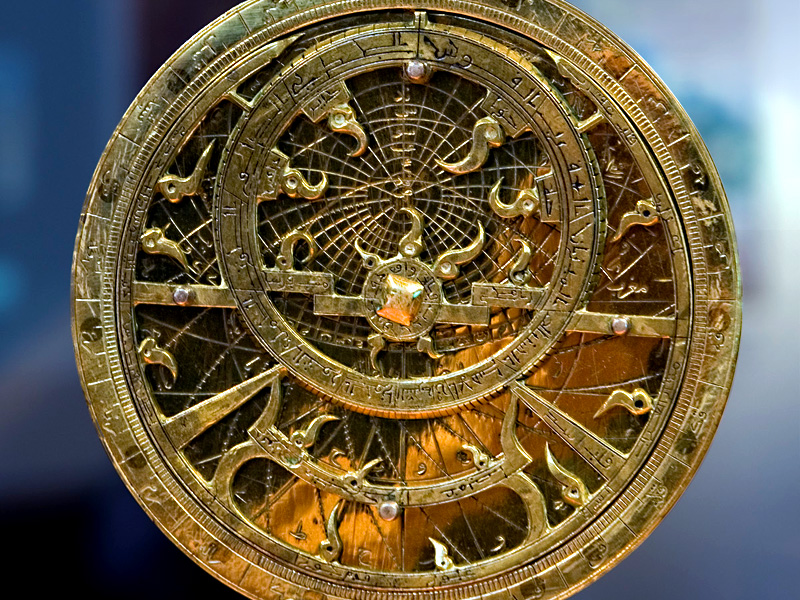
Improvements to the astrolabe were one of the achievements of this era

During the early 20th century, the term was used only occasionally and often referred to as the early military successes of the Rashidun caliphs. It was only in the second half of the 20th century that the term came to be used with any frequency, now mostly referring to the cultural flourishing of science and mathematics under the caliphates during the 9th to 11th centuries (between the establishment of organised scholarship in the House of Wisdom and the beginning of the crusades), but often extended to include part of the late 8th or the 12th to early 13th centuries. Definitions may still vary considerably.

Equating the end of the golden age with the end of the caliphates is a convenient cut-off point based on a historical landmark, but it can be argued that Islamic culture had entered a gradual decline much earlier; thus, Khan (2003) identifies the proper golden age as being the two centuries between 750 and 950, arguing that the beginning loss of territories under Harun al-Rashid worsened after the death of al-Ma'mun in 833, and that the crusades in the 12th century resulted in a weakening of the Islamic empire from which it never recovered.

Regarding the end of the Gola, Mohamad Abdalla argues the dominant approach by scholars is the "decline theory.":

The golden age is considered to have come into existence through a major effort to acquire and translate the ancient sciences of the Greeks between the eighth and ninth centuries. The translation era was followed by two centuries of splendid original thinking and contributions, and is known as the "golden age" of Islamic science. This so-called "golden age" is supposed to have lasted from the end of the ninth to the end of the eleventh century. The era after this period is conventionally known as the "age of decline". A survey of literature from the nineteenth century onward demonstrates that the decline theory has become the preferred paradigm in general academia.

== Causes ==
Expansion of the Caliphates, 622–750: Expansion under Muhammad, 622–632 Expansion during the Rashidun Caliphate, 632–661 Expansion during the Umayyad Caliphate, 661–750

=== Religious influence ===
The various Quranic injunctions, which place values on education and emphasize the importance of acquiring knowledge may have played a vital role in influencing the Muslims of this age in their search for knowledge and the development of the body of science.

=== Government sponsorship ===
The Islamic Empire heavily patronized scholars. The money spent on the Translation Movement for some translations is estimated to be equivalent to about twice the annual research budget of the United Kingdom's Medical Research Council. The best scholars and notable translators, such as Hunayn ibn Ishaq, had salaries that are estimated to be the equivalent of professional athletes today. The House of Wisdom was a library established in Abbasid-era Baghdad, Iraq by Caliph al-Mansur in 825 modeled after the academy of Jundishapur.

=== Openness to diverse influences ===
During this period, the Muslims showed a strong interest in assimilating the scientific knowledge of the civilizations that had been conquered. Many classic works of antiquity that might otherwise have been lost were translated from Greek, Syriac, Middle Persian, and Sanskrit into Syriac and Arabic, some of which were later in turn translated into other languages like Hebrew and Latin.

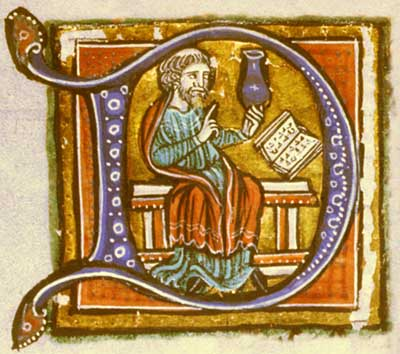
The Christian physician Hunayn ibn Ishaq led the translation of works.

Christians, especially the adherents of the Church of the East (Nestorians), contributed to Islamic civilization during the reign of the Umayyads and the Abbasids by translating works of Greek philosophers and ancient science to Syriac and afterwards to Arabic. They also excelled in many fields, in particular philosophy, science (such as Hunayn ibn Ishaq, Yusuf Al-Khuri, Al Himsi, Qusta ibn Luqa, Masawaiyh, Patriarch Eutychius, and Jabril ibn Bukhtishu) and theology. For a long period of time the personal physicians of the Abbasid Caliphs were often Assyrian Christians. Among the most prominent Christian families to serve as physicians to the caliphs were the Bukhtishu dynasty. Throughout the 4th to 7th centuries, Christian scholarly work in the Greek and Syriac languages was either newly translated or had been preserved since the Hellenistic period. Among the prominent centers of learning and transmission of classical wisdom were Christian colleges such as the School of Nisibis and the School of Edessa, the pagan center of learning in Harran, and the hospital and medical Academy of Gondishapur, which was the intellectual, theological and scientific center of the Church of the East. Many scholars of the House of Wisdom were of Christian background and it was led by Christian physician Hunayn ibn Ishaq, with the support of Byzantine medicine. Many of the most important philosophical and scientific works of the ancient world were translated, including the work of Galen, Hippocrates, Plato, Aristotle, Ptolemy and Archimedes.

Persians also were a notably high proportion of scientists who contributed to the Islamic Golden Age. According to Bernard Lewis: "Culturally, politically, and most remarkable of all even religiously, the Persian contribution to this new Islamic civilization is of immense importance. The work of Iranians can be seen in every field of cultural endeavor, including Arabic poetry, to which poets of Iranian origin composing their poems in Arabic made a very significant contribution."

While cultural influence used to radiate outward from Baghdad, after the Mongol destruction of the Abbasid Caliphate, Arab influence decreased. Iran and Central Asia, benefiting from increased cross-cultural access to East Asia under Mongol rule, flourished and developed more distinctively from Arab influence, such as the Timurid Renaissance under the Timurid dynasty.

=== New technology ===
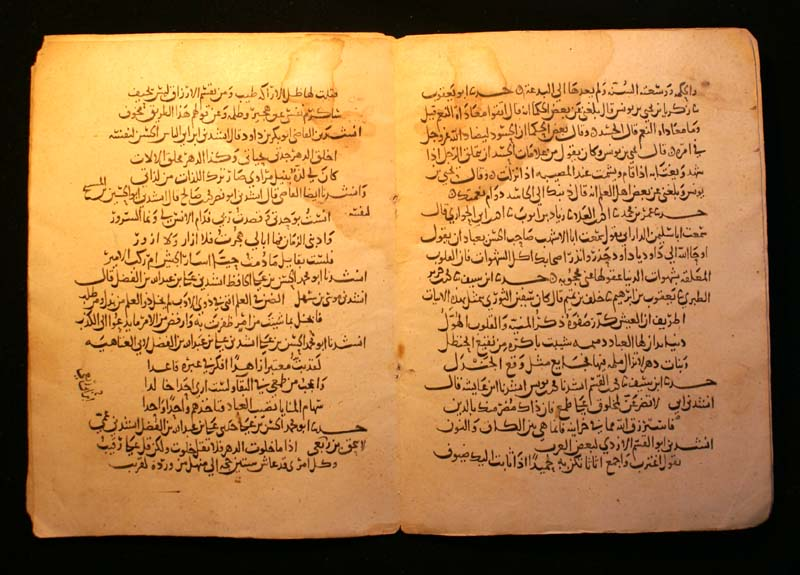
A manuscript written on paper during the Abbasid Era

With a new and easier writing system, and the introduction of paper, information was democratized to the extent that, for probably the first time in history, it became possible to make a living from only writing and selling books. The use of paper spread from China into Muslim regions in the eighth century through mass production in Samarkand and Khorasan, arriving in Al-Andalus on the Iberian Peninsula (modern Spain and Portugal) in the 10th century. It was easier to manufacture than parchment, less likely to crack than papyrus, and could absorb ink, making it difficult to erase and ideal for keeping records. Islamic paper makers devised assembly-line methods of hand-copying manuscripts to turn out editions far larger than any available in Europe for centuries. It was from these countries that the rest of the world learned to make paper from linen.

== Education ==
The centrality of scripture and its study in the Islamic tradition helped to make education a central pillar of the religion in virtually all times and places in the history of Islam. The importance of learning in the Islamic tradition is reflected in a number of hadiths attributed to Muhammad, including one that states "Seeking knowledge is obligatory upon every Muslim". This injunction was seen to apply particularly to scholars, but also to some extent to the wider Muslim public, as exemplified by the dictum of al-Zarnuji, "learning is prescribed for us all". While it is impossible to calculate literacy rates in pre-modern Islamic societies, it is almost certain that they were relatively high, at least in comparison to their European counterparts.

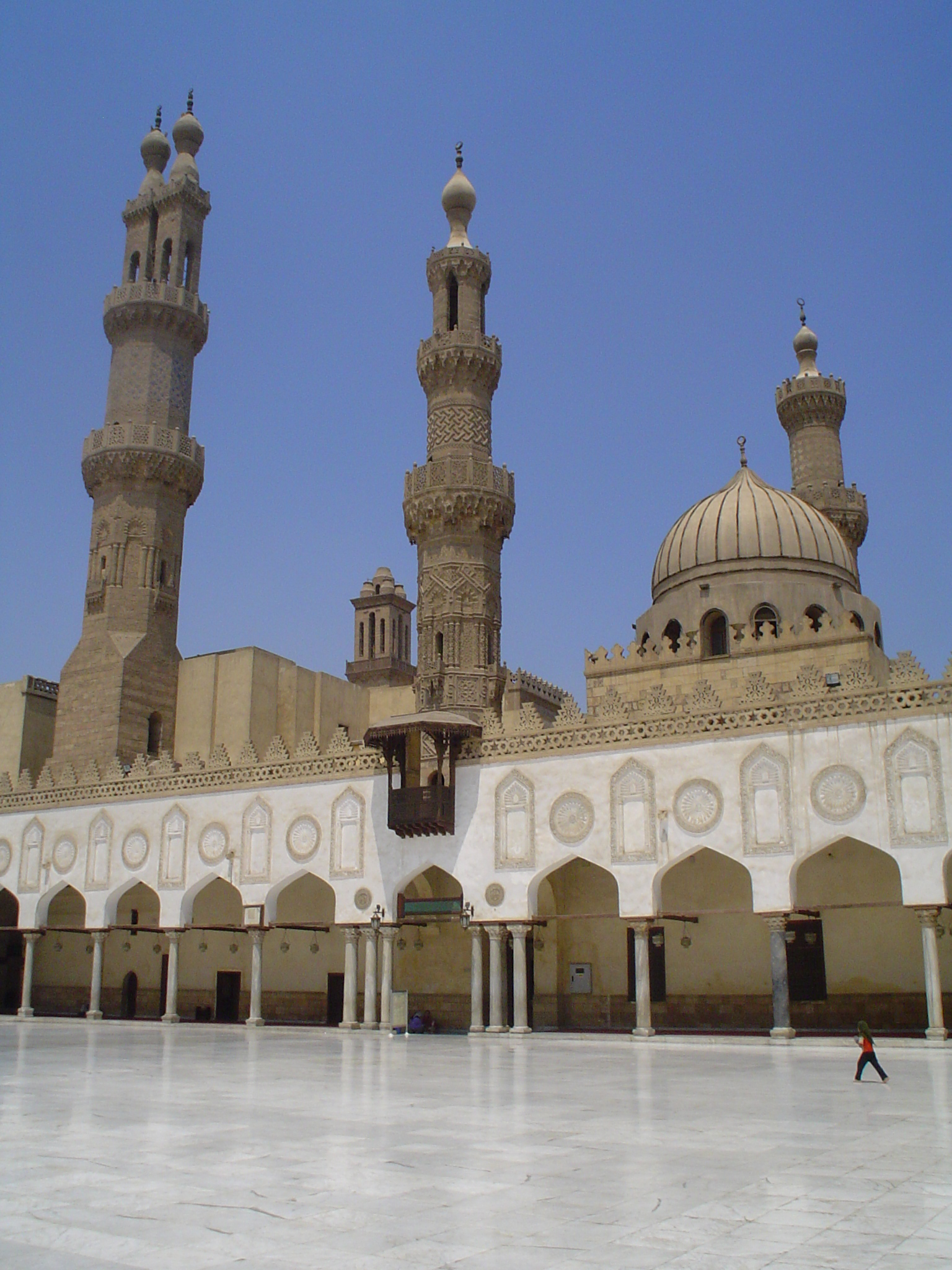
Organized instruction in the Cairo Al-Azhar University and Mosque began in 978

Education would begin at a young age with study of Arabic and the Quran, either at home or in a primary school, which was often attached to a mosque. Some students would then proceed to train in tafsir (Quranic exegesis) and fiqh (Islamic jurisprudence), which was seen as particularly important. Education focused on memorization, but also trained the more advanced students to participate as readers and writers in the tradition of commentary on the studied texts. It also involved a process of socialization of aspiring scholars, who came from virtually all social backgrounds, into the ranks of the ulema.

For the first few centuries of Islam, educational settings were entirely informal, but beginning in the 11th and 12th centuries, the ruling elites began to establish institutions of higher religious learning known as madrasas in an effort to secure support and cooperation of the ulema. Madrasas soon multiplied throughout the Islamic world, which helped to spread Islamic learning beyond urban centers and to unite diverse Islamic communities in a shared cultural project. Nonetheless, instruction remained focused on individual relationships between students and their teacher. The formal attestation of educational attainment, ijaza, was granted by a particular scholar rather than the institution, and it placed its holder within a genealogy of scholars, which was the only recognized hierarchy in the educational system. While formal studies in madrasas were open only to men, women of prominent urban families were commonly educated in private settings and many of them received and later issued ijazas in hadith studies, calligraphy and poetry recitation. Working women learned religious texts and practical skills primarily from each other, though they also received some instruction together with men in mosques and private homes.

Madrasas were devoted principally to study of law, but they also offered other subjects such as theology, medicine, and mathematics. The madrasa complex usually consisted of a mosque, boarding house, and a library. It was maintained by a waqf (charitable endowment), which paid salaries of professors, stipends of students, and defrayed the costs of construction and maintenance. The madrasa was unlike a modern college in that it lacked a standardized curriculum or institutionalized system of certification.

Muslims distinguished disciplines inherited from pre-Islamic civilizations, such as philosophy and medicine, which they called "sciences of the ancients" or "rational sciences", from Islamic religious sciences. Sciences of the former type flourished for several centuries, and their transmission formed part of the educational framework in classical and medieval Islam. In some cases, they were supported by institutions such as the House of Wisdom in Baghdad, but more often they were transmitted informally from teacher to student.

The University of al-Qarawiyyin (al-Karaouine), founded in 859 AD, is listed in The Guinness Book Of Records as the world's oldest degree-granting university. The Al-Azhar University was another early madrasa now recognized as a university. The madrasa is one of the relics of the Fatimid caliphate. The Fatimids traced their descent to Muhammad's daughter Fatimah and named the institution using a variant of her honorific title Al-Zahra (the brilliant). Organized instruction in the Al-Azhar Mosque began in 978. Arabic became a trade language. The Muslim-ruled Spanish capital of Córdoba, which surpassed Constantinople as the Europe's largest city, also became a prominent world leading centre of education and learning producing numerous polymaths.

== Law ==
Juristic thought gradually developed in study circles, where independent scholars met to learn from a local master and discuss religious topics. At first, these circles were fluid in their membership, but with time distinct regional legal schools crystallized around shared sets of methodological principles. As the boundaries of the schools became clearly delineated, the authority of their doctrinal tenets came to be vested in a master jurist from earlier times, who was henceforth identified as the school's founder. In the course of the first three centuries of Islam, all legal schools came to accept the broad outlines of classical legal theory, according to which Islamic law had to be firmly rooted in the Quran and hadith.

The classical theory of Islamic jurisprudence elaborates how scriptures should be interpreted from the standpoint of linguistics and rhetoric. It also comprises methods for establishing authenticity of hadith and for determining when the legal force of a scriptural passage is abrogated by a passage revealed at a later date. In addition to the Quran and sunnah, the classical theory of Sunni fiqh recognizes two other sources of law: juristic consensus (ijmaʿ) and analogical reasoning (qiyas). It therefore studies the application and limits of analogy, as well as the value and limits of consensus, along with other methodological principles, some of which are accepted by only certain legal schools. This interpretive apparatus is brought together under the rubric of ijtihad, which refers to a jurist's exertion in an attempt to arrive at a ruling on a particular question. The theory of Twelver Shia jurisprudence parallels that of Sunni schools with some differences, such as recognition of reason (ʿaql) as a source of law in place of qiyas and extension of the notion of sunnah to include traditions of the imams.

The body of substantive Islamic law was created by independent jurists (muftis). Their legal opinions (fatwas) were taken into account by ruler-appointed judges who presided over qāḍī's courts, and by maẓālim courts, which were controlled by the ruler's council and administered criminal law.

== Theology ==
Classical Islamic theology emerged from an early doctrinal controversy which pitted the ahl al-hadith movement, led by Ahmad ibn Hanbal, who considered the Quran and authentic hadith to be the only acceptable authority in matters of faith, against Mu'tazilites and other theological currents, who developed theological doctrines using rationalistic methods. In 833 the caliph al-Ma'mun tried to impose Mu'tazilite theology on all religious scholars and instituted an inquisition (mihna), but the attempts to impose a caliphal writ in matters of religious orthodoxy ultimately failed. This controversy persisted until al-Ash'ari (874–936) found a middle ground between Mu'tazilite rationalism and Hanbalite literalism, using the rationalistic methods championed by Mu'tazilites to defend most substantive tenets maintained by ahl al-hadith. A rival compromise between rationalism and literalism emerged from the work of al-Maturidi (d. c. 944), and, although a minority of scholars remained faithful to the early ahl al-hadith creed, Ash'ari and Maturidi theology came to dominate Sunni Islam from the 10th century on.

== Philosophy ==
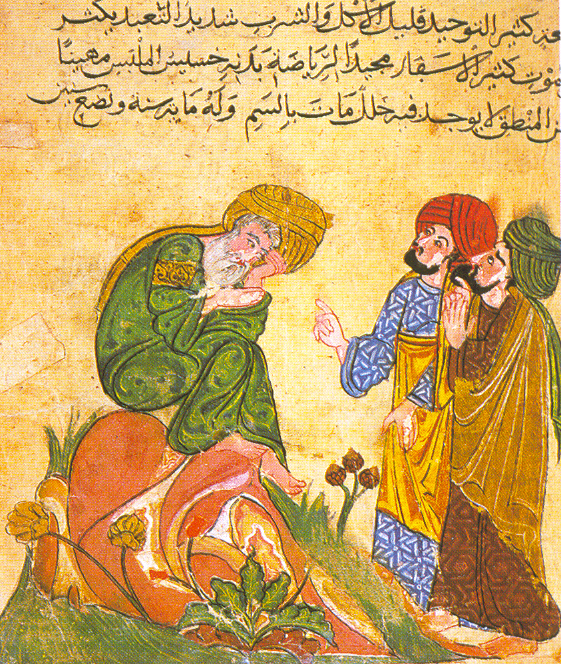
An Arabic manuscript from the 13th century depicting Socrates (Soqrāt) in discussion with his pupils

Ibn Sina (Avicenna) and Ibn Rushd (Averroes) played a major role in interpreting the works of Aristotle, whose ideas came to dominate the non-religious thought of the Christian and Muslim worlds. According to the Stanford Encyclopedia of Philosophy, translation of philosophical texts from Arabic to Latin in Western Europe "led to the transformation of almost all philosophical disciplines in the medieval Latin world". The influence of Islamic philosophers in Europe was particularly strong in natural philosophy, psychology and metaphysics, though it also influenced the study of logic and ethics.

=== Metaphysics ===
Ibn Sina argued his "Floating man" thought experiment concerning self-awareness, in which a man deprived of sense experience by being blindfolded and free falling would still be aware of his existence.

=== Epistemology ===
In epistemology, Ibn Tufail wrote the novel Hayy ibn Yaqdhan and in response Ibn al-Nafis wrote the novel Theologus Autodidactus. Both were concerning autodidacticism as illuminated through the life of a feral child spontaneously generated in a cave on a desert island.

== Mathematics ==
=== Algebra ===
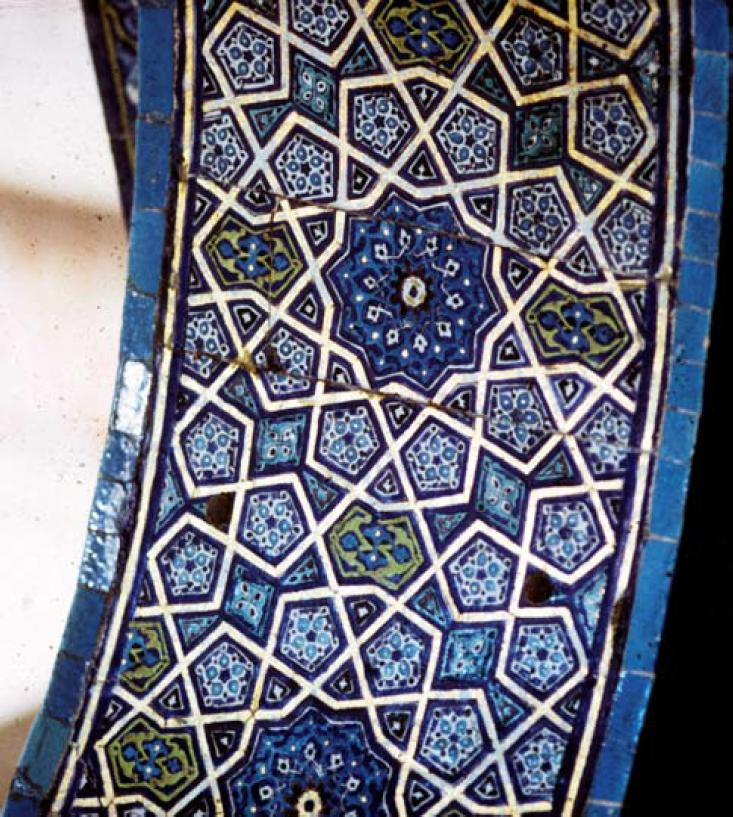
Geometric patterns: an archway in the Sultan's lodge in the Ottoman Green Mosque in Bursa, Turkey (1424), its girih strapwork forming 10-point stars and pentagons

Persian mathematician Muḥammad ibn Mūsā al-Khwārizmī played a significant role in the development of algebra, arithmetic and Hindu–Arabic numerals. He has been described as the father of algebra by some.

Another Persian mathematician, Omar Khayyam, is credited with identifying the foundations of Analytic geometry. Omar Khayyam found the general geometric solution of the cubic equation. His book Treatise on Demonstrations of Problems of Algebra (1070), which was a significant step in the development of algebra, is part of the body of Persian mathematics that was eventually transmitted to Europe.

Yet another Persian mathematician, Sharaf al-Dīn al-Tūsī, found algebraic and numerical solutions to various cases of cubic equations. He also developed the concept of a function.

=== Calculus ===
Ibn al-Haytham (Alhazen) discovered the sum formula for the fourth power, using a method that could be generally used to determine the sum for any integral power. He used this to find the volume of a paraboloid. He could find the integral formula for any polynomial without having developed a general formula.

=== Geometry ===
Islamic art makes use of geometric patterns and symmetries in many of its art forms, notably in girih tilings. These are formed using a set of five tile shapes, namely a regular decagon, an elongated hexagon, a bow tie, a rhombus, and a regular pentagon. All the sides of these tiles have the same length; and all their angles are multiples of 36° (π/5 radians), offering fivefold and tenfold symmetries. The tiles are decorated with strapwork lines (girih), generally more visible than the tile boundaries. In 2007, the physicists Peter Lu and Paul Steinhardt argued that girih from the 15th century resembled quasicrystalline Penrose tilings. Elaborate geometric zellige tilework is a distinctive element in Moroccan architecture. Muqarnas vaults are three-dimensional but were designed in two dimensions with drawings of geometrical cells.

Jamshīd al-Kāshī's estimate of pi would not be surpassed for 180 years.

=== Trigonometry ===
Arab mathematician Ibn Muʿādh al-Jayyānī is one of the several scholars to whom the invention of the spherical law of sines is attributed; he wrote "The Book of Unknown Arcs of a Sphere" in the 11th century.

=== Statistics ===
The earliest use of statistical inference was given by the Arab mathematician Al-Kindi (c. 801–873, also known as "Alkindus" in Europe), in Risalah fi Istikhraj al-Mu'amma (A Manuscript on Deciphering Cryptographic Messages) which contains the first description of the method of frequency analysis.

== Natural sciences ==
=== Scientific method ===
Ibn al-Haytham (Alhazen) was a significant figure in the history of scientific method, particularly in his approach to experimentation, and has been described as the "world's first true scientist".

Avicenna made rules for testing the effectiveness of drugs, including that the effect produced by the experimental drug should be seen constantly or after many repetitions, to be counted. The physician Rhazes was an early proponent of experimental medicine and recommended using control for clinical research. He said: "If you want to study the effect of bloodletting on a condition, divide the patients into two groups, perform bloodletting only on one group, watch both, and compare the results."

=== Astronomy ===
Astronomy in Islam was able to grow greatly because of several key factors. One factor was geographical: the Islamic world was close to the ancient lands of the Greeks, which held valuable ancient knowledge of the heavens in Greek manuscripts. During the new Abbasid Dynasty after the movement of the capital in 762 AD to Baghdad, translators were sponsored to translate Greek texts into Arabic. This translation period led to many major scientific works from Galen, Ptolemy, Aristotle, Euclid, Archimedes, and Apollonius being translated into Arabic. From these translations previously lost knowledge of the cosmos was now being used to advance current astrological thinkers. The second key factor of astronomy's growth was the religious observances followed by Muslims which expected them to pray at exact times during the day. These observances in timekeeping led to many questions in previous Greek mathematical astronomy, especially their timekeeping.

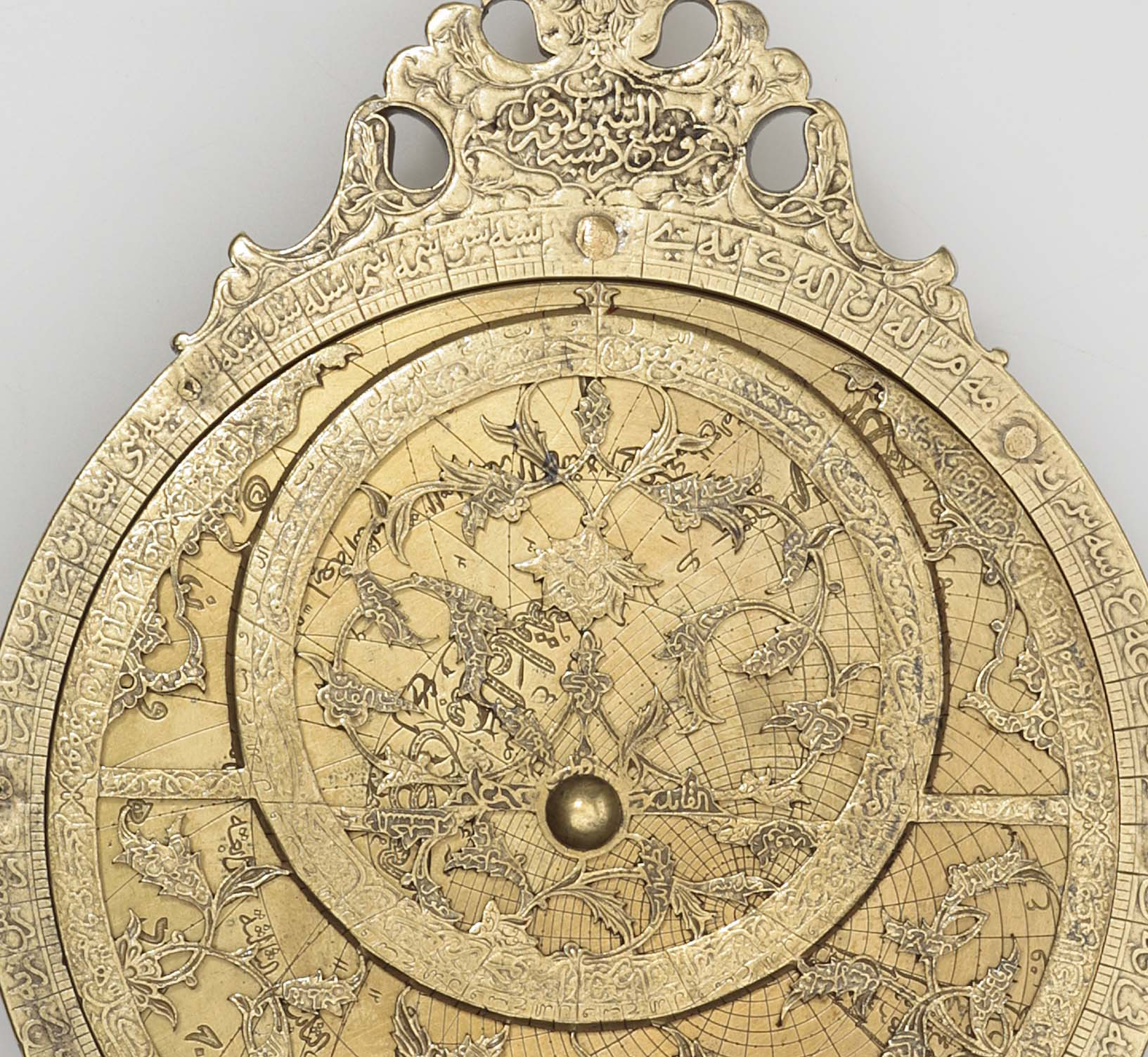
Astrolabe with Quranic inscriptions from Iran, dated 1060 AH (1650-51 AD)

The astrolabe was a Greek invention which was an important piece of Arabic astronomy. An astrolabe is a handheld two-dimensional model of the sky which can solve problems of spherical astronomy. It is made up of lines of altitude and azimuth with an index, horizon, hour circle, zenith, Rete, star pointer, and equator to accurately show where the stars are at that given moment. Use of the astrolabe is best expressed in Al-Farghani's treatise on the astrolabe due to the mathematical way he applied the instrument to astrology, astronomy, and timekeeping. The earliest known Astrolabe in existence today comes from the Islamic period. It was made by Nastulus in 927-28 AD and is now a treasure of the Kuwait National Museum.

In about 964 AD, the Persian astronomer Abd al-Rahman al-Sufi, writing in his Book of Fixed Stars, described a "nebulous spot" in the constellation of Andromeda, the first definitive reference to what is now known to be the Andromeda Galaxy, the nearest spiral galaxy to the Milky Way.

The geocentric system developed by Ptolemy placed the Sun, Moon, and other planets in orbit around the Earth. Ptolemy thought that the planets moved on circles called epicycles and that their centers rode on deferents. The deferents were eccentric, and the angular motion of a planet was uniform around the equant which was a point opposite the deferent center. Simply, Ptolemy's models were a mathematical system for predicting the positions of the planets. One of the first to criticize this model was Ibn al-Haytham, a leader of physics in the 11th century in Cairo. Then in the 13th century Nasir al-Din al-Tusi constructed the Maragha Observatory in what is today Iran. Al-Tusi found the equant dissatisfying and replaced it by adding a geometrical technique called a Tusi-couple, which generates linear motion from the sum of two circular motions. Then, Ibn al-Shatir who was working in Damascus in 1350 AD employed the Tusi-couple to successfully eliminate the equant as well as other objectionable circles that Ptolemy had used. This new model properly aligned the celestial spheres and was mathematically sound. This development by Ibn al-Shatir, as well as the Maragha astronomers remained relatively unknown in medieval Europe.

The names for some of the stars used, including Betelgeuse, Rigel, Vega, Aldebaran, and Fomalhaut are several of the names that come directly from Arabic origins or are the translations of Ptolemy's Greek descriptions which are still in use today.

Tusi couple

=== Physics ===
Alhazen played a role in the development of optics. One of the prevailing theories of vision in his time and place was the emission theory supported by Euclid and Ptolemy, where sight worked by the eye emitting rays of light, and the other was the Aristotelian theory that sight worked when the essence of objects flows into the eyes. Alhazen correctly argued that vision occurred when light, traveling in straight lines, reflects off an object into the eyes. Al-Biruni wrote of his insights into light, stating that its velocity must be immense when compared to the speed of sound.

=== Chemistry ===
The early Islamic period saw the establishment of some of the longest lived theoretical frameworks in alchemy and chemistry. The sulfur-mercury theory of metals, first attested in pseudo-Apollonius of Tyana's Sirr al-khalīqa ("The Secret of Creation", c. 750–850) and in the Arabic writings attributed to Jābir ibn Ḥayyān (written c. 850–950), would remain the basis of all theories of metallic composition until the eighteenth century. Likewise, the Emerald Tablet, a compact and cryptic text that all later alchemists up to and including Isaac Newton (1642–1727) would regard as the foundation of their art, first occurs in the Sirr al-khalīqa and in one of the works attributed to Jābir.

Substantial advances were also made in practical chemistry. The works attributed to Jābir, and those of the Persian alchemist and physician Abū Bakr al-Rāzī (c. 865–925), contain the earliest known systematic classifications of chemical substances. However, alchemists were not only interested in identifying and classifying chemical substances, but also in artificially creating them. Significant examples from the medieval Islamic world include the synthesis of ammonium chloride from organic substances as described in the works attributed to Jābir, and Abū Bakr al-Rāzī's experiments with vitriol, which would eventually lead to the discovery of mineral acids like sulfuric acid and nitric acid by thirteenth century Latin alchemists such as pseudo-Geber.

=== Geodesy ===
Al-Biruni (973–1050) estimated the radius of the earth as 6339.6 km (modern value is c. 6,371 km), the best estimate at that time.

=== Biology ===
Modern commentators have likened medieval accounts of the "struggle for existence" in the animal kingdom to the framework of the theory of evolution. Thus, in his survey of the history of the ideas which led to the theory of natural selection, Conway Zirkle noted that al-Jahiz was one of those who discussed a "struggle for existence", in his Kitāb al-Hayawān (Book of Animals), written in the 9th century. In the 13th century, Nasir al-Din al-Tusi believed that humans were derived from advanced animals, saying, "Such humans [probably anthropoid apes] live in the Western Sudan and other distant corners of the world. They are close to animals by their habits, deeds and behavior." In 1377, Ibn Khaldun in his Muqaddimah stated, "The animal kingdom was developed, its species multiplied, and in the gradual process of Creation, it ended in man and arising from the world of the monkeys."

In genetics, Arab physician Al-Zahrawi was the first to identify the hereditary nature of haemophilia.

==== Medicine and surgery ====
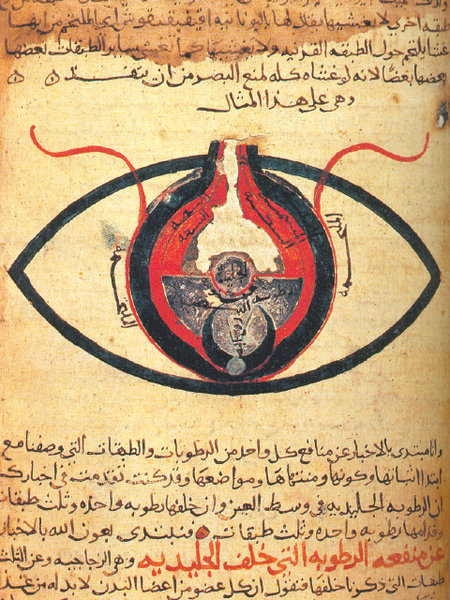
The eye, according to Hunayn ibn Ishaq. From a manuscript dated c. 1200.

For Islamic scholars, Indian and Greek physicians and medical researchers Sushruta, Galen, Mankah, Atreya, Hippocrates, Charaka, and Agnivesha were pre-eminent authorities. In order to make the Indian and Greek tradition more accessible, understandable, and teachable, Islamic scholars ordered and made more systematic the vast Indian and Greco-Roman medical knowledge by writing encyclopedias and summaries. Sometimes, past scholars were criticized, like Rhazes who criticized and refuted Galen's revered theories, most notably, the Theory of Humors and was thus accused of ignorance. It was through 12th-century Arabic translations that medieval Europe rediscovered Hellenic medicine, including the works of Galen and Hippocrates, and discovered ancient Indian medicine, including the works of Sushruta and Charaka. Works such as Avicenna's The Canon of Medicine were translated into Latin and disseminated throughout Europe. During the 15th and 16th centuries alone, The Canon of Medicine was published more than thirty-five times. It was used as a standard medical textbook through the 18th century in Europe. The largely dominant theory of the time was Humorism where four separate "humors" (liquid substances, including blood, phlegm, yellow bile and dark bile) whose balance were thought to be the key to health and a natural body-temperature. In the book Al Shakook ala Jalinoos or "The Doubt on Galen" al-Razi criticized some of Galen's theories, particularly humorism, saying that they did not agree with his own clinical observations. Arab physician Ibn Zuhr provided proof that scabies is caused by the itch mite and that it can be cured by removing the parasite without the need for purging, bleeding or other treatments called for by humorism, making a break with the humorism of Galen and Avicenna.

Regarding the cardiovascular system, Arab physician Ibn al-Nafis in his Commentary on Anatomy in Avicenna's Canon was the first known scholar to contradict the contention of the Galen School that blood could pass between the ventricles in the heart through the cardiac inter-ventricular septum that separates them, saying that there is no passage between the ventricles at this point. Instead, he correctly argued that all the blood that reached the left ventricle did so after passing through the lung. He also stated that there must be small communications, or pores, between the pulmonary artery and pulmonary vein, a prediction that preceded the discovery of the pulmonary capillaries of Marcello Malpighi by 400 years. The Commentary was rediscovered in the twentieth century in the Prussian State Library in Berlin; whether its view of the pulmonary circulation influenced scientists such as Michael Servetus is unclear.

In neurology, Rhazes stated that nerves had motor or sensory functions, describing 7 cranial and 31 spinal cord nerves. He assigned a numerical order to the cranial nerves from the optic to the hypoglossal nerves. He classified the spinal nerves into 8 cervical, 12 thoracic, 5 lumbar, 3 sacral, and 3 coccygeal nerves. He used this to link clinical signs of injury to the corresponding location of lesions in the nervous system.

In infectious diseases, Rhazes differentiated through careful observation the two diseases smallpox and measles, which were previously lumped together as a single disease that caused rashes. This was based on location and the time of the appearance of the symptoms and he also scaled the degree of severity and prognosis of infections according to the color and location of rashes. Rhazes, who was once asked to choose the site for a new hospital in Baghdad, suspended pieces of meat at various points around the city, and recommended building the hospital at the location where the meat putrefied the slowest.

In obstetrics and gynaecology, Al-Zahrawi was the first physician to describe an ectopic pregnancy.

In pediatrics, Al-Razi is sometimes called the "Father of pediatrics" for writing the monograph, The Diseases of Children treating paediatrics as an independent field of medicine.

In surgery, the tenth century Arab physician Al-Zahrawi is sometimes referred to as the "Father of surgery". He describes what is thought to be the first attempt at reduction mammaplasty for the management of gynaecomastia and the first mastectomy to treat breast cancer. He is credited with the performance of the first thyroidectomy. He wrote three textbooks on surgery, including Manual of Medial Practitioners which contains a catalog of 278 instruments used in surgery. In the thirteenth century, Ibn al-Quff was a physician and surgeon who published numerous books, commentaries, treatises on surgery. Most notably, he wrote Basics in the Art of Surgery, a general medical manual covering anatomy, drugs therapy and surgical care, which was by far the largest Arabic text on surgery during the entire medieval period.

== Engineering ==
The Banū Mūsā brothers, in their 9th century Book of Ingenious Devices, describe an automatic flute player which may have been the first programmable machine. The flute sounds were produced through hot steam and the user could adjust the device to various patterns so that they could get various sounds from it. The brothers contributed to the House of Wisdom, a research body which was established by the Abbasid Caliphate.

The 12th century scholar-inventor Ismail al-Jazari, in his writings describes of numerous mechanical devices, ideas on automation and construction methods, most notable among them being the Elephant clock. While late in the 16th century, the Ottoman-era Taqi ad-Din Muhammad wrote on a mechanism that worked with the application of steam energy. He describes a self-rotating spit which was rotated by the direction of steam into the mechanism's vanes which then turns the wheel at the end of an axle, this technology being an important part of the development of the steam turbine.

During this time period, Roman Aqueducts were being used and expanded upon. Starting in the 9th and 10th century Arab and Moorish peasants started restoring the ruined aqueducts. The peasants also improved upon the aqueducts by localizing the technology to the respective landscapes of their area. The aqueducts which were initially publicly available, built for that use by the Romans, soon became privatized. The local powers used the aqueducts to gain power in their respective communities. This later evolved to the regional royalty assuming ownership over the aqueducts in the 11th-12th centuries. Some aqueducts were utilized by the royalty to supply water to their palace wells and gardens.

== Social sciences ==
Ibn Khaldun is regarded to be among the founding fathers of modern sociology, historiography, demography, (Note: "...regarded by some Westerners as the true father of historiography and sociology".; "Ibn Khaldun has been claimed the forerunner of a great number of European thinkers, mostly sociologists, historians, and philosophers".(Boulakia 1971); "The founding father of Eastern Sociology".; "This grand scheme to find a new science of society makes him the forerunner of many of the eighteenth and nineteenth centuries system-builders such as Vico, Comte and Marx." "As one of the early founders of the social sciences...".) and economics. (Note: "He is considered by some as a father of modern economics, or at least a major forerunner. The Western world recognizes Khaldun as the father of sociology but hesitates in recognizing him as a great economist who laid its very foundations. He was the first to systematically analyze the functioning of an economy, the importance of technology, specialization and foreign trade in economic surplus and the role of government and its stabilization policies to increase output and employment. Moreover, he dealt with the problem of optimum taxation, minimum government services, incentives, institutional framework, law and order, expectations, production, and the theory of value".Cosma, Sorinel (2009). "Ibn Khaldun's Economic Thinking". Ovidius University Annals of Economics (Ovidius University Press) XIV:52–57) Archiving was a respected position during this time in Islam though most of the governing documents have been lost over time. However, from correspondence and remaining documentation gives a hint of the social climate as well as shows that the archives were detailed and vast during their time. All letters that were received or sent on behalf of the governing bodies were copied, archived and noted for filing. The position of the archivist was seen as one that had to have a high level of devotion as they held the records of all pertinent transactions.

== Hospitals ==
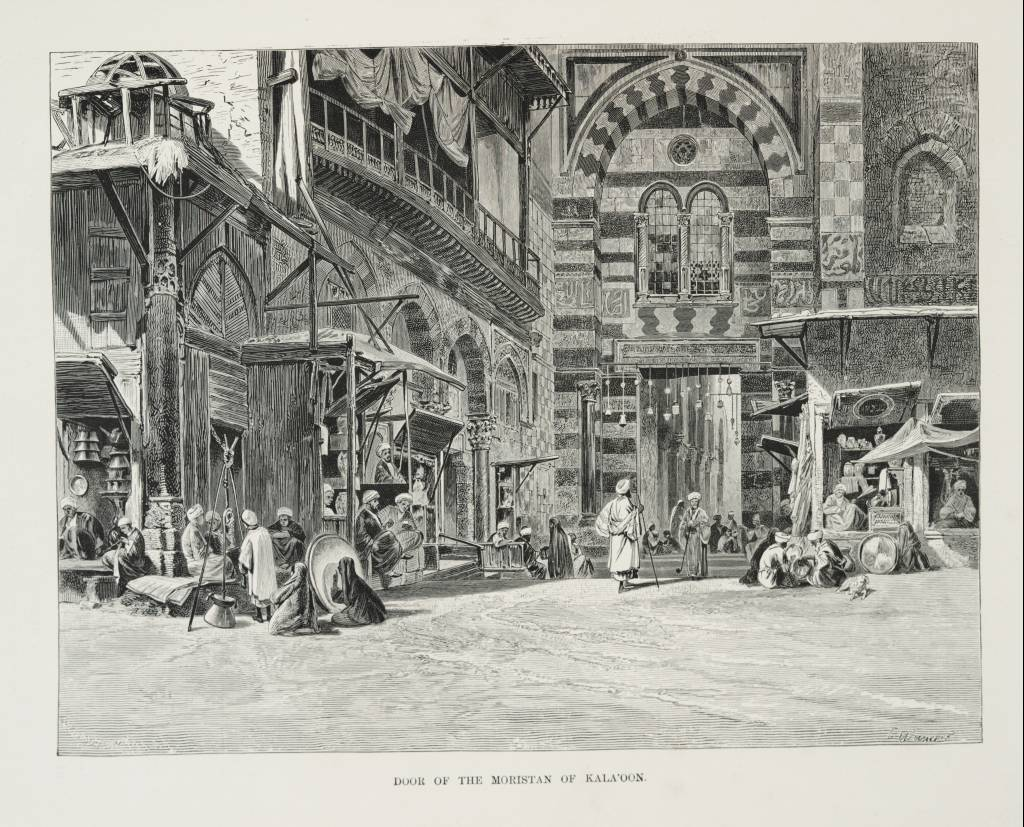
Entrance to the Qalawun complex which housed the notable Mansuri hospital in Cairo

The earliest known Islamic hospital was built in 805 in Baghdad by order of Harun Al-Rashid, and the most important of Baghdad's hospitals was established in 982 by the Buyid ruler 'Adud al-Dawla. The best documented early Islamic hospitals are the great Syro-Egyptian establishments of the 12th and 13th centuries. By the tenth century, Baghdad had five more hospitals, while Damascus had six hospitals by the 15th century and Córdoba alone had 50 major hospitals, many exclusively for the military.

The typical hospital was divided into departments such as systemic diseases, surgery, and orthopedics, with larger hospitals having more diverse specialties. "Systemic diseases" was the rough equivalent of today's internal medicine and was further divided into sections such as fever, infections and digestive issues. Every department had an officer-in-charge, a presiding officer and a supervising specialist. The hospitals also had lecture theaters and libraries. Hospitals staff included sanitary inspectors, who regulated cleanliness, and accountants and other administrative staff. The hospitals were typically run by a three-man board comprising a non-medical administrator, the chief pharmacist, called the shaykh saydalani, who was equal in rank to the chief physician, who served as mutwalli (dean). Medical facilities traditionally closed each night, but by the 10th century laws were passed to keep hospitals open 24 hours a day.

For less serious cases, physicians staffed outpatient clinics. Cities also had first aid centers staffed by physicians for emergencies that were often located in busy public places, such as big gatherings for Friday prayers. The region also had mobile units staffed by doctors and pharmacists who were supposed to meet the need of remote communities. Baghdad was also known to have a separate hospital for convicts since the early 10th century after the vizier 'Ali ibn Isa ibn Jarah ibn Thabit wrote to Baghdad's chief medical officer that "prisons must have their own doctors who should examine them every day". The first hospital built in Egypt, in Cairo's Southwestern quarter, was the first documented facility to care for mental illnesses. In Aleppo's Arghun Hospital, care for mental illness included abundant light, fresh air, running water and music.

Medical students would accompany physicians and participate in patient care. Hospitals in this era were the first to require medical diplomas to license doctors. The licensing test was administered by the region's government appointed chief medical officer. The test had two steps; the first was to write a treatise, on the subject the candidate wished to obtain a certificate, of original research or commentary of existing texts, which they were encouraged to scrutinize for errors. The second step was to answer questions in an interview with the chief medical officer. Physicians worked fixed hours and medical staff salaries were fixed by law. For regulating the quality of care and arbitrating cases, it is related that if a patient dies, their family presents the doctor's prescriptions to the chief physician who would judge if the death was natural or if it was by negligence, in which case the family would be entitled to compensation from the doctor. The hospitals had male and female quarters while some hospitals only saw men and other hospitals, staffed by women physicians, only saw women. While women physicians practiced medicine, many largely focused on obstetrics.

Hospitals were forbidden by law to turn away patients who were unable to pay. Eventually, charitable foundations called waqfs were formed to support hospitals, as well as schools. Part of the state budget also went towards maintaining hospitals. While the services of the hospital were free for all citizens and patients were sometimes given a small stipend to support recovery upon discharge, individual physicians occasionally charged fees. In a notable endowment, a 13th-century governor of Egypt Al-Mansur Qalawun ordained a foundation for the Qalawun hospital that would contain a mosque and a chapel, separate wards for different diseases, a library for doctors and a pharmacy and the hospital is used today for ophthalmology. The Qalawun hospital was based in a former Fatimid palace which had accommodation for 8,000 people – "it served 4,000 patients daily." The waqf stated,

... The hospital shall keep all patients, men and women, until they are completely recovered. All costs are to be borne by the hospital whether the people come from afar or near, whether they are residents or foreigners, strong or weak, low or high, rich or poor, employed or unemployed, blind or sighted, physically or mentally ill, learned or illiterate. There are no conditions of consideration and payment, none is objected to or even indirectly hinted at for non-payment.

=== Pharmacies ===
Arabic scholars used their natural and cultural resources to contribute to the strong development of pharmacology. They believed that God had provided the means for a cure for every disease. However, there was confusion about the nature of some ancient plants that existed during this time.

A prominent figure that was influential in the development of pharmacy used the name Yuhanna Ibn Masawaiyh (c. 777–857). He was referred to as "The Divine Mesue" and "The Prince of Medicine" by European scholars. Masawaiyh led the first private medical school in Baghdad and wrote three major pharmaceutical treatises. These treatises consisted of works over compound medicines, humors, and pharmaceutical recipes that provided instructions on how they were to be prepared. In the Latin West, these works were typically published together under the title "Opera Medicinalia" and were broken up into "De simplicubus", "Grabadin", and "Canones universales". Although Masawaiyh's influence was so significant that his writings became the most dominant source of pharmaceutical writings, his exact identity remains unclear.

In the past, all substances that were to be introduced into, on or near the human body were labeled as medicine, ranging from drugs, food, beverages, even perfumes to cosmetics. The earliest distinction between medicine and pharmacy as disciplines began in the seventh century, when pharmacists and apothecaries appeared in the first hospitals. Demand for drugs increased as the population increased. By the ninth century where pharmacy was established as an independent and well-defined profession by Muslim scholars. It is said by many historians that the opening of the first private pharmacy in the eighth century marks the independence of pharmacy from medicine.

The emergence of medicine and pharmacy within the Islamic caliphate by the ninth century occurred at the same time as rapid expansion of many scientific institutions, libraries, schools, hospitals and then pharmacies in many Muslim cities. The rise of alchemy during the ninth century also played a vital role for early pharmacological development. While Arab pharmacists were not successful in converting non-precious metals into precious metals, their works giving details of techniques and lab equipment were major contributors to the development of pharmacy. Chemical techniques such as distillation, condensation, evaporation and pulverization were often used.

The Qur'an provided the basis for the development of professional ethics where the rise of ritual washing also influenced the importance of hygiene in pharmacology. Pharmacies were periodically visited by government inspectors called muhtasib, who checked to see that the medicines were mixed properly, not diluted and kept in clean jars. Work done by the muhtasib was carefully outlined in manuals that explained ways of examining and recognizing falsified drugs, foods and spices. It was forbidden for pharmacists to perform medical treatment without the presence of a physician, while physicians were limited to the preparation and handling of medications. It was feared that recipes would fall into the hands of someone without the proper pharmaceutical training. Licenses were required to run private practices. Violators were fined or beaten.

== Commerce and travel ==
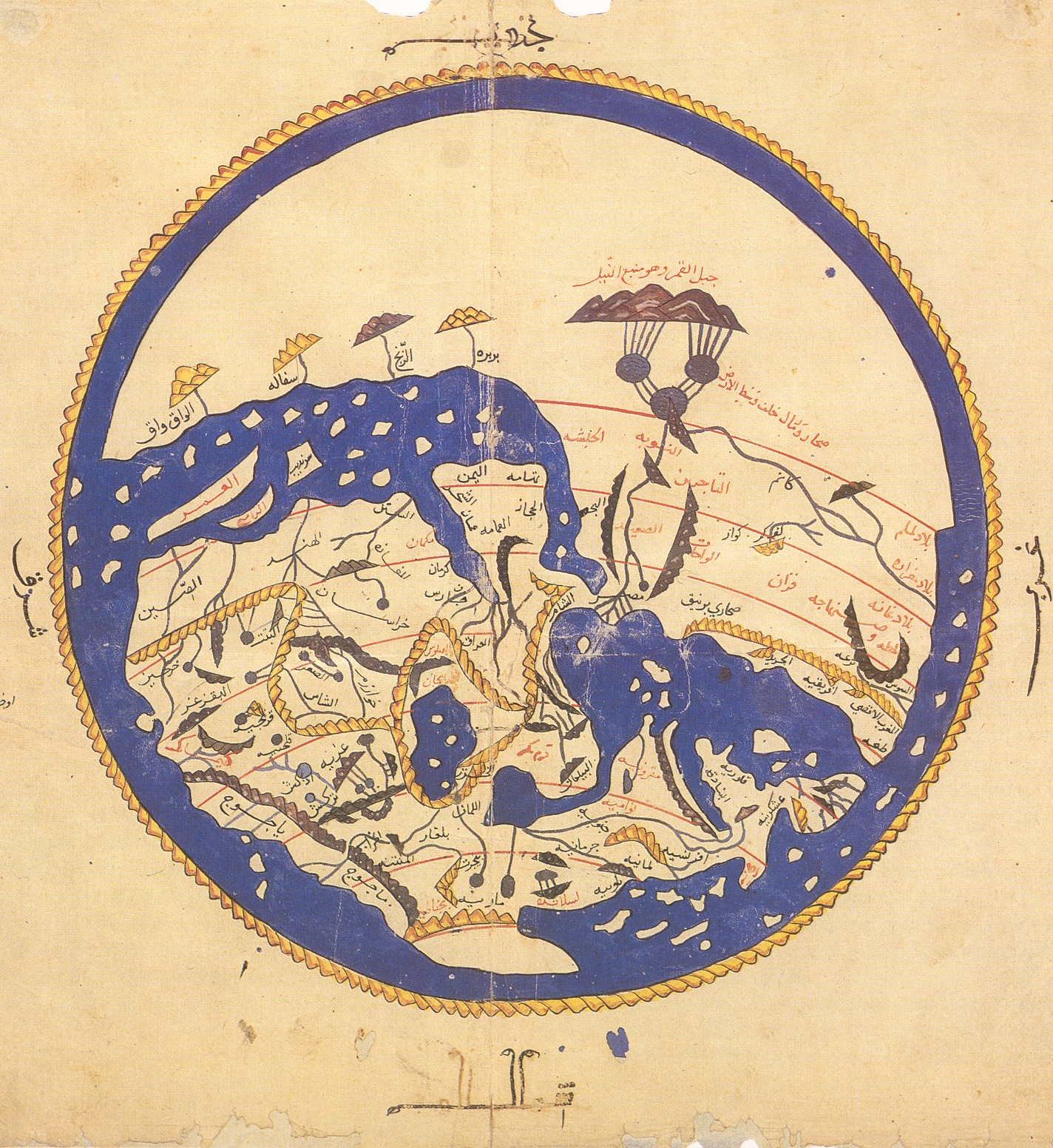
Introductory summary overview map from al-Idrisi's 1154 world atlas (South is at the top of the map.)

Apart from the Nile, Tigris, and Euphrates, navigable rivers were uncommon in West Asia and North Africa, so transport by sea was very important. Navigational sciences were highly developed, making use of a rudimentary sextant (known as a kamal). When combined with detailed maps of the period, sailors were able to sail across oceans rather than skirt along the coast. Muslim sailors were also responsible for reintroducing large, three-masted merchant vessels to the Mediterranean. The name caravel may derive from an earlier Arab boat known as the qarib.

Many Muslims went to China to trade, and these Muslims began to have a great economic influence on the country. Muslims virtually dominated the import/export industry by the time of the Song dynasty (960–1279). Muhammad al-Idrisi created the Tabula Rogeriana, the best maps of the Middle Ages, used by various explorers such as Christopher Columbus and Vasco Da Gama for their voyages in America and India.

=== Agriculture ===
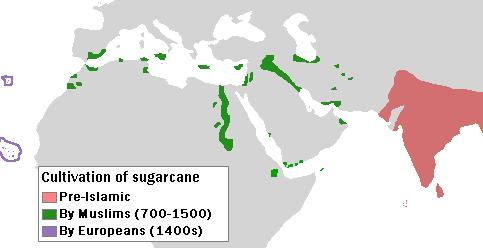
The diffusion of sugarcane from the Indian subcontinent to Spain during Islamic rule

The Arabs of Al-Andalus exerted a large impact on Spanish agriculture, including the restoration of Roman-era aqueducts and irrigation channels, as well as the introduction of new technologies such as the acequias and Islamic gardens (such as at the Generalife). In Spain and Sicily, the Arabs introduced crops and foodstuffs from Persia, Khorasan, Tabaristan, Iraq, Levant, Egypt, Sindh and India such as rice, sugarcane, oranges, lemons, bananas, saffron, carrots, apricots and eggplants, as well as restoring cultivation of olives and pomegranates from Greco-Roman times. The Palmeral of Elche in southern Spain is a UNESCO World Heritage site that is emblematic of the Islamic agricultural legacy in Europe.

== Arts and culture ==
=== Literature and poetry ===
The 13th century poet Rumi (also known as Mawlana) (Romanized: mwlana) (Arabic word meaning "the great of our crowd")) wrote some of the finest poetry in the Persian language and remains one of the best selling poets in the United States. Other famous poets of the Persian language include Hafez (whose work was read by William Jones, Thoreau, Goethe, Ralph Waldo Emerson and Friedrich Engels), Saadi (whose poetry was cited extensively by Goethe, Hegel and Voltaire), Ferdowsi, Omar Khayyam and Amir Khusrow.

One Thousand and One Nights, an anthology of folk tales from Asia and Africa compiled in the Arabic language during the time of the Abbasid Caliphate, has had a large influence on world literature and popular culture with such classics as Aladdin, Ali Baba and the Forty Thieves and Sinbad the Sailor. The folk-tale 'Sinbad the Sailor' even draws inspiration directly from Hellenistic literature like the Homeric epics (translated from Greek to Arabic in the 8th century CE) and Alexander Romances (tales of Alexander the Great popular in regions of Europe, Asia, and Africa).

=== Art ===
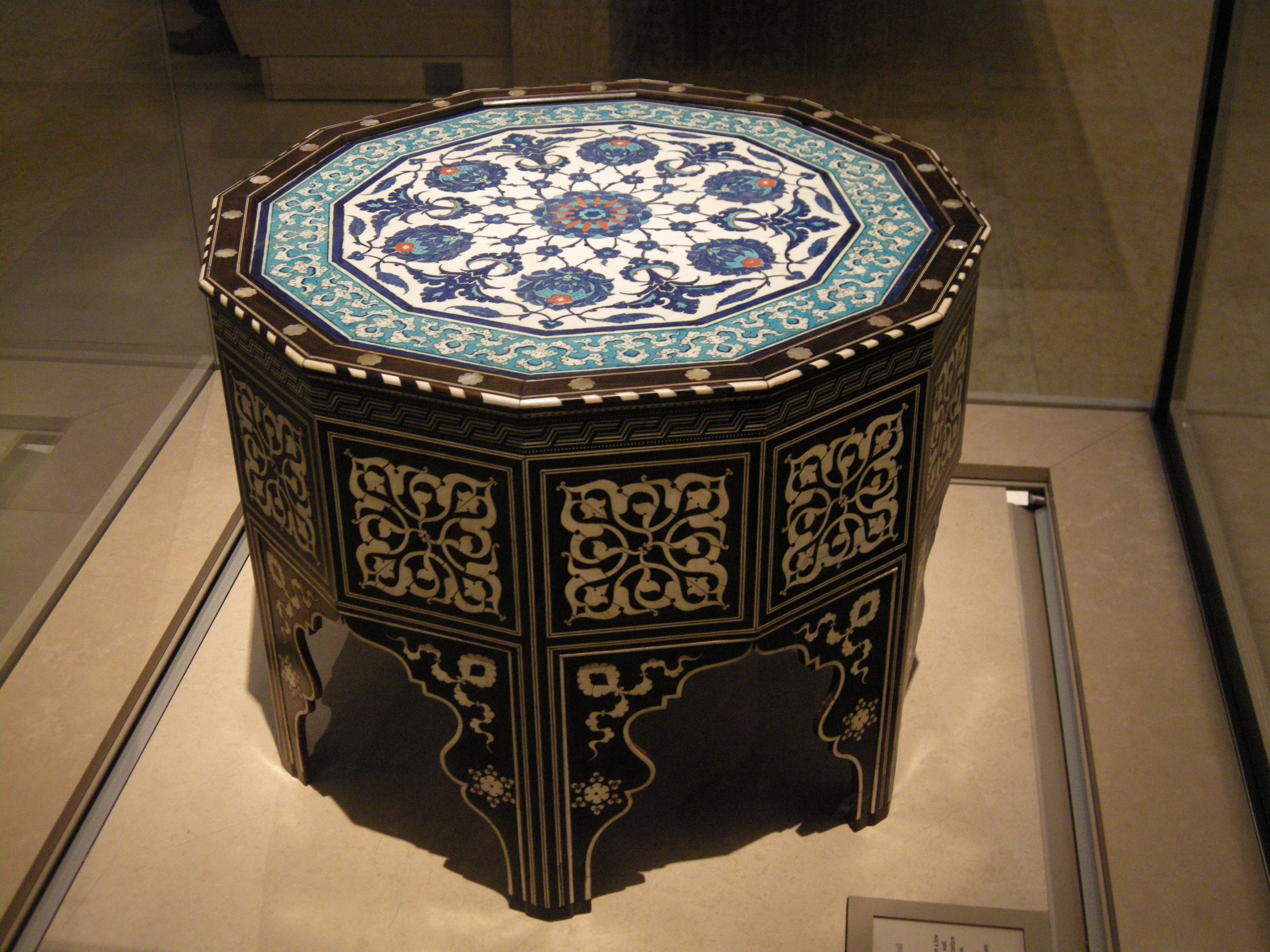
Marquetry and tile-top table, 1560

Calligraphy, an essential aspect of written Arabic, developed in manuscripts and architectural decoration. This form of visual art can be found adorning the walls of palaces, the interior and domes of mosques as well as the surrounding structure of minbars. Calligraphy would use a variety of stylised and standardised scripts, two major scripts among them being kufic and naskh. Ceramics, metalwork and glassware were also brilliantly decorated with geometric patterns and vibrant colors.

Manuscript illumination was an important art, and Persian miniature painting flourished in the Persianate world, and went on to influence miniature art in the Ottoman and Mughal court between the 16th–17th centuries. Very few surviving records of wall painting exists, especially ones that represented the human face. A rare example of this are the early 9th-century fragments from the ruins of the Dar al-Khilafah palace at Samarra from the Abbasid period. These are fragments of larger wall paintings depicting harem women, period-era clothing and animals.

=== Music ===
The ninth and tenth centuries saw a flowering of Arabic music. Philosopher and esthete Al-Farabi, at the end of the ninth century, established the foundations of modern Arabic music theory, based on the maqammat, or musical modes. His work was based on the music of Ziryab, the court musician of Andalusia. Ziryab was a renowned polymath, whose contributions to western civilization included formal dining, haircuts, chess, and more, in addition to his dominance of the world musical scene of the ninth century.

The Sumerians and Akkadians, the Greeks, and the Persians all used math to create notes used on lutes and lyres and other stringed instruments. Using the idea that a plucked or bowed string produces a note, they noticed the difference in tone when a string is stopped. "The great discovery" was hearing the double octave, that halving a string produces a note one octave above the string. Written as a ratio 2:1.

They measured the ratios of string lengths on one side and the other of where the string was pressed, creating ratios. Those ratios allowed them to compare sounds, for example third intervals, fourths, fifths. They were able to tune one string against another in those intervals on lutes, lyres, harps, zithers. Lutes gave them the further ability to create those intervals on a single string, by adding frets at mathematically spaced distances, based on the ratios. Unlike modern instruments, where frets may be permanently fixed into the neck, as on a guitar, the older instruments used gut strings tied around the neck for frets, and this made their instruments adjustable. Early musicians could tune their instruments to different modes. Lute players could tune the strings to different intervals, and could further adjust the frets for the modes.

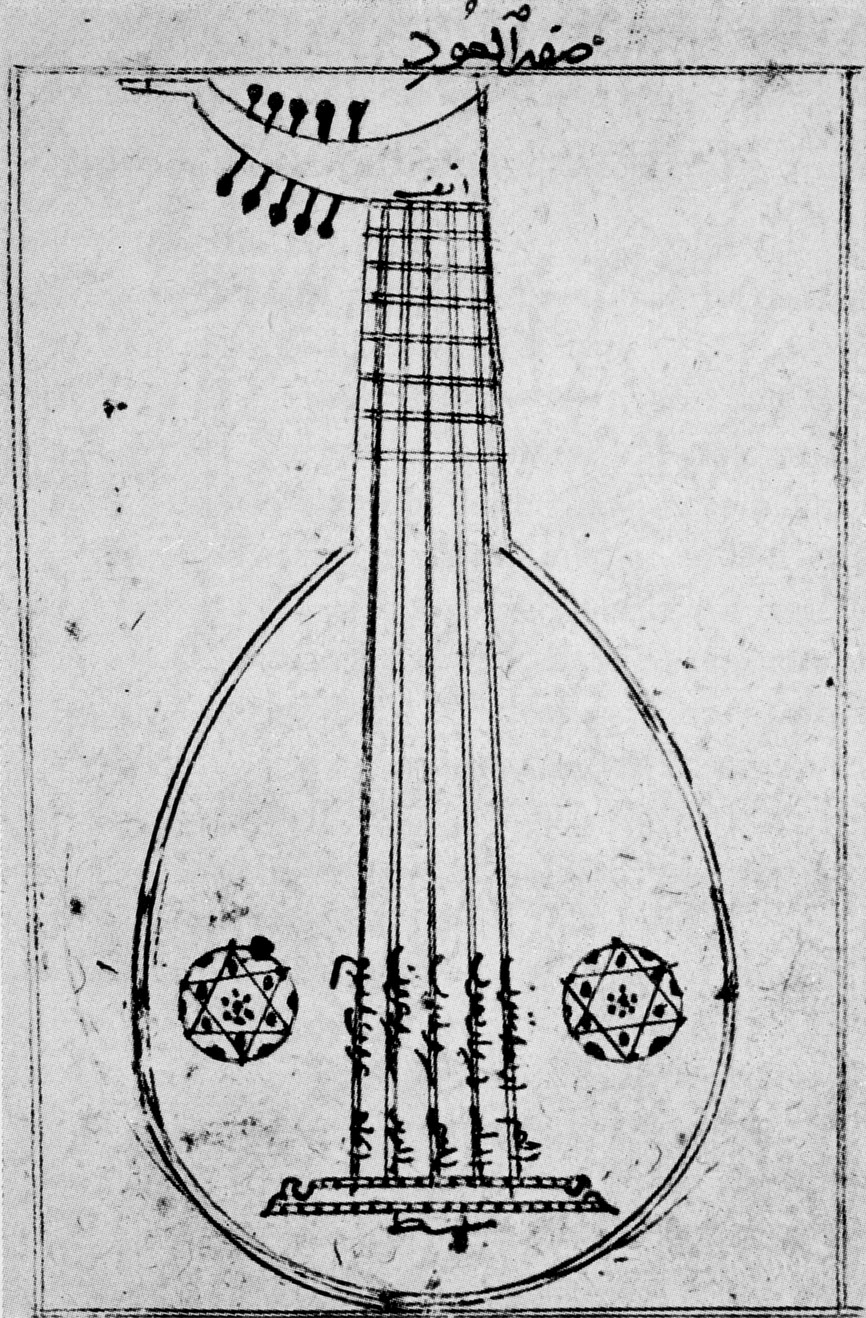
Drawing of a lute by Safi al-Din from a 1333 copy of his book, Kitab al-Adwār. The oldest copy dates to 1296.

The mixing cultures of Central Asia and Arabia produced several thinkers who wrote about music, including something about the lute in their works, including Al-Kindi (c. 801 – c. 873), Ziryab (789–857), Al-Farabi (c. 872 – c. 950), Avicenna (c. 980 – 1037), and Safi al-Din al-Urmawi (1216–1294). They wrote in Arabic, what had become the useful lingua-Franca of their time, and took part in Muslim society and culture. However they were brought up in Central Asia.

The Arabs had a musical scale, described by al-Farabi, in use by some through the 13th century A.D. That tanbar scale, which divided the string into "40 equal parts" may have been a leftover from Babylon and Assyria. However, the Arabs traded with and conquered the Persians, and they adopted Persian scales for their lutes, just as they adopted Persian short-necked lutes.

Ziryab moved from Baghdad to al-Andalus, where he set up a school of music and was one of the first to add a fifth string or course to oud, "between 822 and 852). Al-Andalus, where he settled would become a center of musical instrument development for Europe.

Al-Kindi was a polymath who wrote as many as 15 music-related treatises. He was among the first to apply Greek musical theory to Central Asian-Arabian short lutes. He added semi-tones between the nut and the first string. He also added a fifth string to his oud in the east, as Ziryab had done in the west.

Al-Farabi "fully incorporated the works of Aristoxenus and Ptolemy into his theory of tetrachords", and wrote among books in many subjects, the Kitab al-Musiqa al-Kabir, the Major Book of Music, in which he detailed how to tune an oud, using mathematical ratios. He gave instruction for both 10 frets and 12, telling where to place the tied (and moveable) gut-string frets on the neck. His way of tuning allowed a "12-fret 'ud tuning — which results ... 'double-octave' scale", with 22 notes in each octave.

=== Architecture ===
The Great Mosque of Kairouan (in Tunisia), the ancestor of all the mosques in the western Islamic world excluding Turkey and the Balkans, is one of the best preserved and most significant examples of early great mosques. Founded in 670, it dates in its present form largely from the 9th century. The Great Mosque of Kairouan is constituted of a three-tiered square minaret, a large courtyard surrounded by colonnaded porticos, and a huge hypostyle prayer hall covered on its axis by two cupolas.

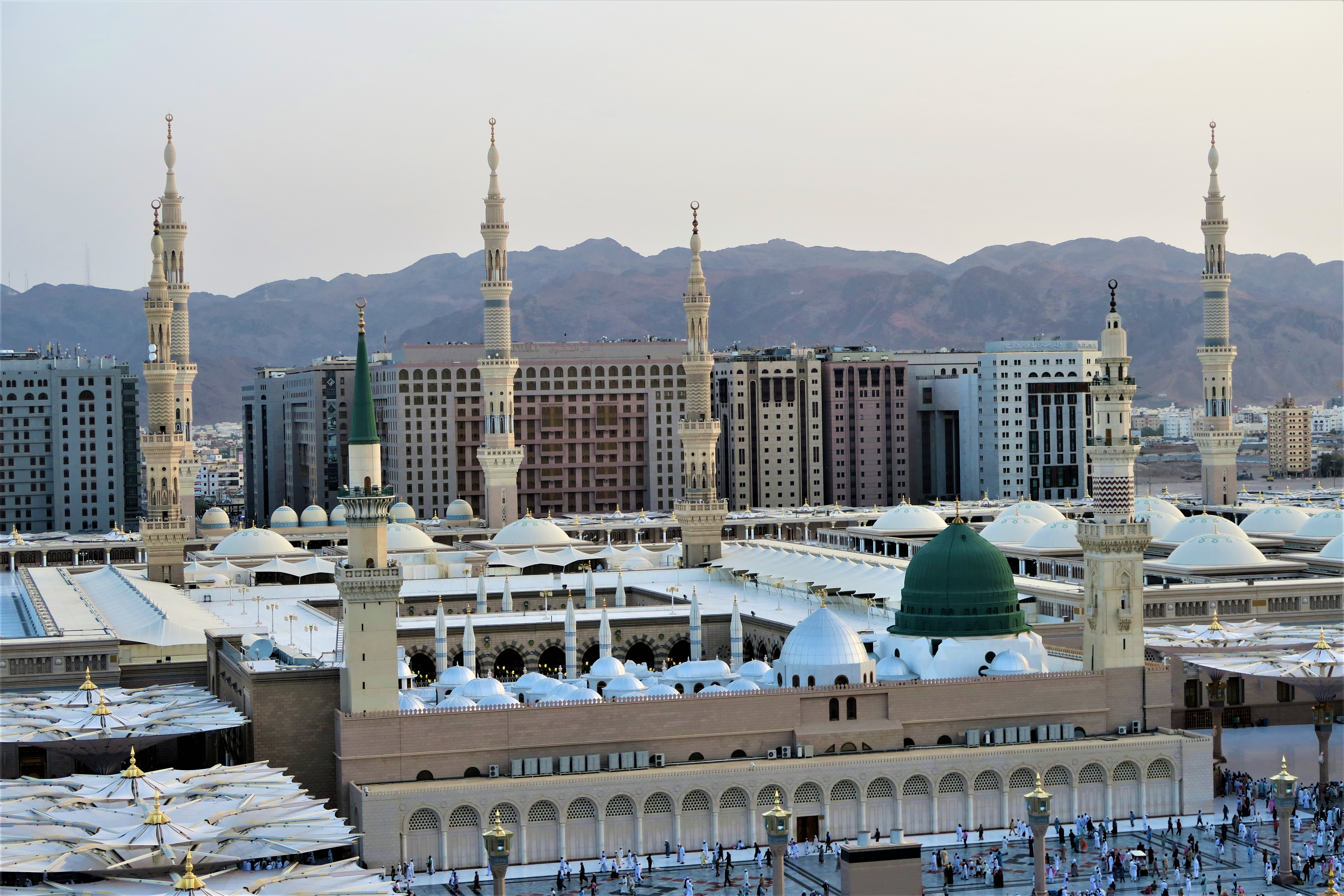
The Mosque of the Prophet, standing on the site of Muhammad's first mosque in Medina. The present-day building is the result of many reconstructions and expansions up to modern times.

The Great Mosque of Samarra in Iraq was completed in 847. It combined the hypostyle architecture of rows of columns supporting a flat base, above which a huge spiralling minaret was constructed.

The beginning of construction of the Great Mosque at Cordoba in 785 marked the beginning of Islamic architecture in Spain and Northern Africa. The mosque is noted for its striking interior arches. Moorish architecture reached its peak with the construction of the Alhambra, the magnificent palace/fortress of Granada, with its open and breezy interior spaces adorned in red, blue, and gold. The walls are decorated with stylized foliage motifs, Arabic inscriptions, and arabesque design work, with walls covered in geometrically patterned glazed tiles.

Many traces of Fatimid architecture exist in Cairo today, the most defining examples include the Al Azhar University and the Al Hakim mosque.

== Decline ==
=== Cultural factors ===
Economic historian Joel Mokyr has argued that Islamic philosopher al-Ghazali (1058–1111), the author of The Incoherence of the Philosophers, "was a key figure in the decline in Islamic science" and that this led to a cultural shift shunning away from scientific thinking. In a 2014 opinion piece published by Al Jazeera, student of Islamic jurisprudence Mohamed Ghilan argued that al-Ghazali was not generally against science, only its encroachment upon religious matters. Professor of Arabic and Islamic Science George Saliba has pointed out that the golden age did not slow down after al-Ghazali, and argued that the golden age of astronomy should be located in the post-Ghazali period. According to Ahmad Y. al-Hassan, the decline of sciences in the Islamic world did not occur until after the 16th century.

=== Political and economic factors ===
Ahmad Y. al-Hassan has rejected the thesis that lack of creative thinking was a cause, arguing that science was always kept separate from religious argument; he instead analyzes the decline in terms of economic and political factors, drawing on the work of the 14th-century writer Ibn Khaldun.

Several other contemporary scholars have analysed the decline in terms of political and economic factors. Current research has led to the conclusion that "the available evidence is consistent with the hypothesis that an increase in the political power of these elites caused the observed decline in scientific output." The decline could be part of a larger trend where the non-Western world fell behind the West in the Great Divergence. In 1206, Genghis Khan established the Mongol Empire which, during the 13th century, conquered most of the Eurasian land mass, including China in the east and much of the old Islamic caliphate (as well as Kievan Rus') in the west. The destruction of Baghdad and the House of Wisdom by Hulagu Khan in 1258 has been seen by some as the end of the Islamic Golden Age. However, while cultural influence used to radiate outward from Baghdad, after the fall of Baghdad, Iran and Central Asia saw a cultural flourishing by benefiting from increased cross-cultural access to East Asia under Mongol rule.

== See also ==
- Baghdad School
- Christian influences on the Islamic world
  - List of Christian scientists and scholars of the medieval Islamic world
- Danish Golden Age
- Dutch Golden Age
- Elizabethan era
- Emirate of Sicily
- Golden age of Jewish culture in Spain
- Ibn Sina Academy of Medieval Medicine and Sciences
- Astronomy in the medieval Islamic world
- Islamic studies
- Islamic world contributions to Medieval Europe
- List of pre-modern Iranian scientists and scholars
- Ophthalmology in the medieval Islamic world
- Science in the medieval Islamic world
- Spanish Golden Age
- Timeline of science and engineering in the Muslim world
- Glossary of Islam
- Outline of Islam
- Index of Islam-related articles
