= Yusuf al-Khuri =

Ancient Christian priest, physician, mathematician

Yusuf al-Khuri (Arabic: يوسف الخوري), also known as Yusuf al-Khuri al-Qass (d. 912), was a Christian priest, physician, mathematician, and translator of the Abbasid era.

He was one of the five most prominent translators and scholars hired by the Banu Musa brothers along with Hunayn ibn Ishaq, Thabit Ibn Qurra, Qusta Ibn Luqa and Al Himsi. The Banu Musa brothers were mathematicians and patrons of the House of Wisdom in Baghdad who financed missions to find ancient manuscripts in foreign lands and have them translated.

After the death of the Banu Musa, he formed part of the school of translators founded and led by Thabit Ibn Qurra which produced Arabic versions of some of the mathematical classics: Euclid, Archimedes, Apollonios, Theodosios, Ptolemy.

== Translated works ==
Among his translated works are Archimedes’ lost work on triangles and The Quadrature of the Parabola (Quadratura parabolae) with the title Kitab al-Muthallathat from Syriac into Arabic, which was afterwards revised by Thabit Ibn Qurra. He also translated Galen's “De simplicium medicamentorum temperamentis ac facultatibus”, which was afterwards revised by Hunayn ibn Ishaq.

== See also ==
- House of Wisdom
- University of Harran
- Islamic Golden Age
