= Bait al Hikmat =

Bait al-Hikmat بیت الحکمہ
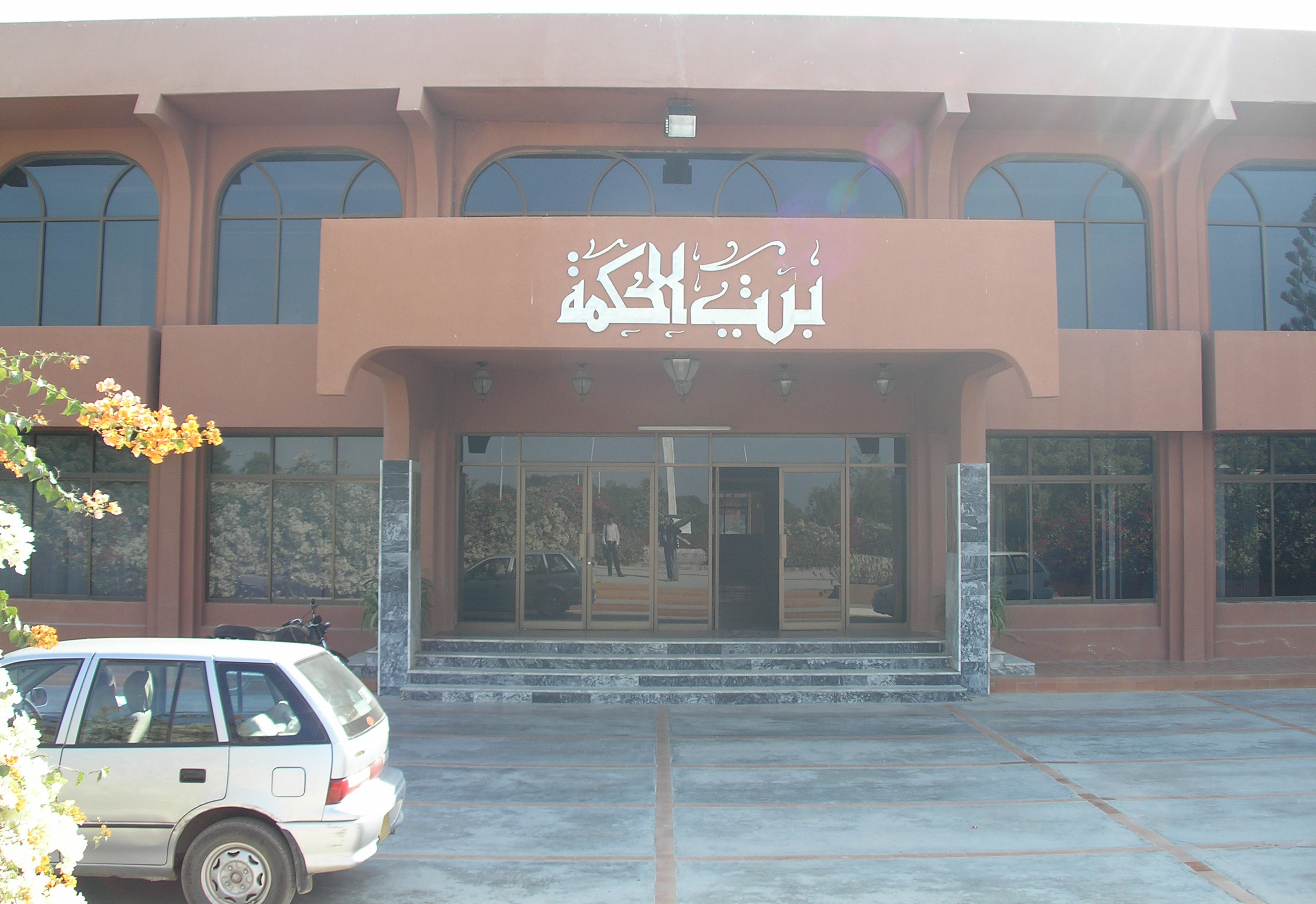
- 25.082582°N 67.010480°E
- Location: Hamdard University, Karachi, Pakistan
- Type: Academic library
- Established: 11 December 1989

Collection
- Items collected: Ancient and Modern Books, Manuscripts, Clippings, Postage Stamps, Coins and Photographs
- Size: 477,251 books 1,738 manuscripts Approx. 3.68 million clippings covering over 1300 subjects

Other information
- Employees: 22
- Website: http://library.hamdard.edu.pk/

Bait al Hikmat (Urdu: بیت الحکمہ Trans. House of Wisdom) is the main academic library at the Hamdard University, Karachi, Pakistan. Its gate opened in December 1989 and is named after the famous library, House of Wisdom, in Baghdad. The library houses over half a million modern volumes as well as thousands of ancient manuscripts, millions of clippings, translations of the Quran in over 60 languages, A.V. Cassettes, as well as Postage Stamps, Coins and Photographs of Hamdard University/Foundation Activities. It is one of the largest library of Pakistan.

== History ==
After laying the foundation-stone of Madinat al-Hikmah, the city of Education, Science and Culture on 15 December 1983 at Bund Murad, twenty seven Kilometre from Karachi, the foundation-stone of Hamdard University was laid on 17 June 1985 by President Muhammad Zia-ul-Haq. It was established by Hakim Mohammed Said, the founder of Madinat al-Hikmah, a humanitarian and a philanthropist. After the completion of the Bait al-Hikmah, the first major and most important institution of Madinat al-Hikmah, Hakim Said invited President Ghulam Ishaq Khan to inaugurate the library on 11 December 1989.

Bait al-Hikmah library reflects the memory of the first Bait al-Hikmah (House of Wisdom) established in Baghdad by Khalifa Abu Jafar al-Mansur between 135 and 158 A.H (714–737 CE). Later it was developed by Caliph Harun al-Rashid and Caliph Mamoon Rashid during the 14th century. The present Bait al-Hikmah symbolises a wooded transfusion to the Muslim's traditional love for learning and scholarship.

== Facilities ==
The Bait al-Hikmah as a Central Library and Center for Academic Research possesses all requisite modern library equipment and facilities as well as a qualified staff. It is used by students, faculties, researchers, scholars and freelancers nationally and internationally. The library is fully computerised.

Bait al-Hikmah Library has large collection of books and journals on different subjects and in different languages, covering Science and Technology, Medicine, Management Sciences, Indo-Pakistan History, Islam and Religion, Traditional/Alternative Systems of Medicine, Social Sciences and Jurisprudence besides Urdu, English, Arabic and Persian Literature, as well as departmental specialised libraries of the Hamdard University at College of Medicine, College of Eastern Medicine, Institute of Management Sciences, Institute of Education and Social Sciences, Institute of Information Technology, Faculty of Pharmacy and Faculty of Legal studies which meet the needs of their students and teachers to a considerable extent.

Hakim Said collected significant Islamic manuscripts from around the world and gave them to the Bait al-Hikmah. The Manuscripts section of Bait al-Hikmah library houses old and rare, centuries-old hand-written manuscripts of the Quran. The periodical section has 2,255 Journals (current), and about 28,010 bound volumes of journals (back issues). The clipping section has more than 3.68 million clippings on over 1,300 subjects.

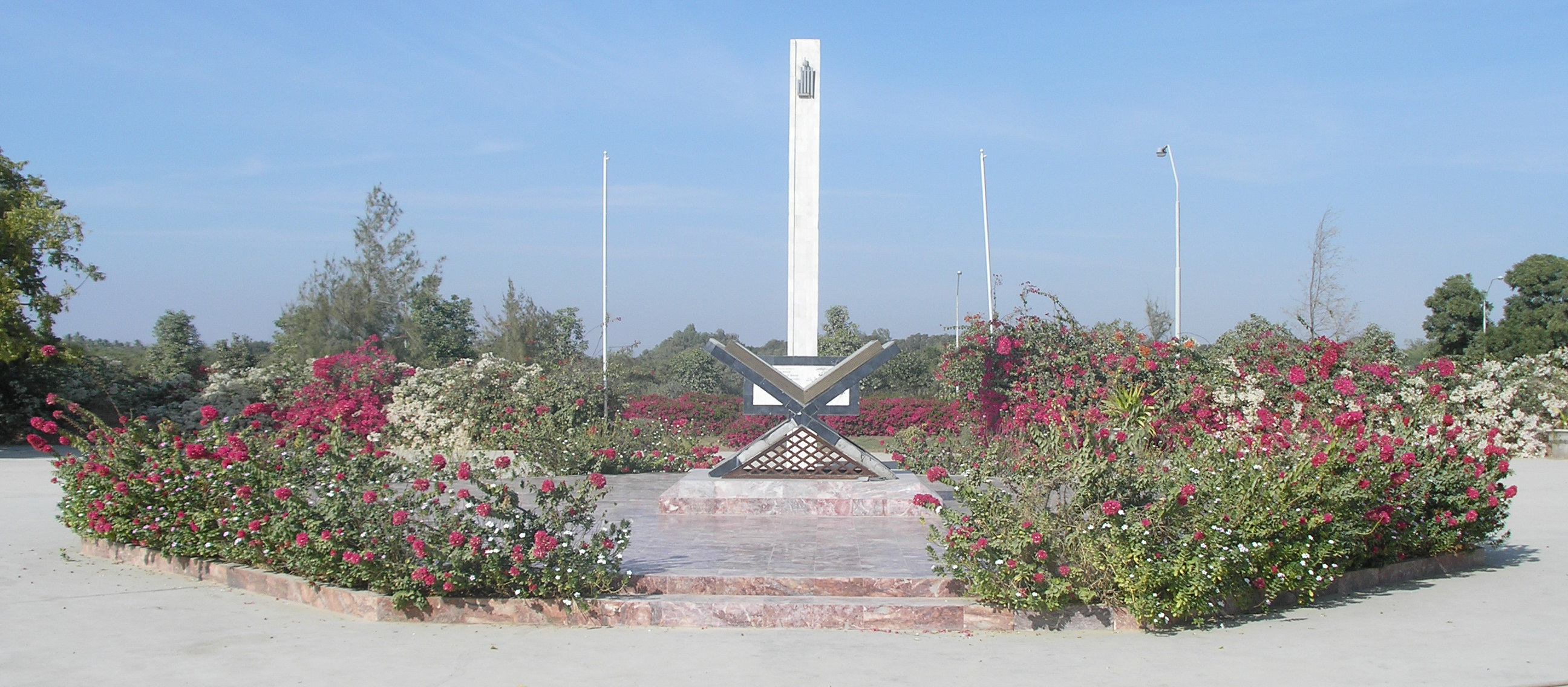
Architectural detail in front of the entrance to Bait al-Hikmat

Hamdard Foundation Pakistan has published more than 250 research publications in collaboration with Bait al-Hikmah and is publishing four International Standard Journals: Hamdard Sehat, Hamdard Medicus, Hamdard Islamicus and the Journal of Pakistan Historical Society. Through the publication of these International Standard Journals, Bait al-Hikmah has established an international exchange relationship with all the leading institutions, organization, universities and libraries of the world. In exchange of these Journals Bait al-Hikmah is also receiving thousands of periodicals and books.

The library has many facilities available, like microfilms and microfiche, photocopying, telefax, telex, e-mail and internet. Projector for films and slides, study rooms and special cubicles and sections for local and foreign research scholars and students are also available. It has an auditorium with a capacity of 350 persons and a Simultaneous Interpretation System (SIS) in five languages, and it has a board room for holding high level meetings and also equipped with facilities for meetings and seminars.

At present Bait al-Hikmah Library has more than 477 thousand books, 1,700+ manuscripts and more than three-and-a-half million clippings.

== See also ==
- Hamdard University
- Hakim Mohammed Said
- Hamdard Laboratories
- List of universities in Karachi
- Bund Murad
- Caliph Harun al-Rashid
- Caliph Mamoon Rashid
