= House of Knowledge =

Medieval university in Egypt

- Other name: Dar El-Ilm
- Type: Collegiate research university Medieval university
- Active: 1004 CE–1517 CE
- Location: Cairo, Egypt

The House of Knowledge (Egyptian Arabic: دار العلم, romanized: Dār al-ʿIlm) was a medieval Egyptian university built in Cairo, Egypt in 1004 CE. Originally a library, the House of Knowledge was converted to a state university by the Fatimid Imam-Caliph al-Hakim bi-Amr Allah in the same year.

In keeping with the Islamic tradition of knowledge, the Egyptians collected books on a variety of subjects and their libraries attracted the attention of scholars from around the world. Al-Hakim was a great patron of learning and provided paper, pens, ink and inkstands without charge to all those who wished to study at the House of Knowledge.

== See also ==
- House of Wisdom
- Al-Mu'ayyad fi'l-Din al-Shirazi
- Library of Alexandria
- Al-Azhar University
- Madrasa
- Nalanda mahavihara
- Fatimid Great Palaces
