= Ibn Na'ima al-Himsi =

Ibn Na'ima al-Himsi (Arabic: ابن ناعمة الحمصي) (dates unknown; early ninth century) was a Syrian Christian who belonged to the Al-Kindi circle of translators who rendered Greek texts into Arabic. In particular, Al-Himsi translated Aristotle's Sophistical Refutations and Physics into Arabic. It is uncertain as to whether he translated directly from Greek or from intermediary Syriac versions a common technique among the Arabic translators.

The Arabic version of Plotinus' Theology of Aristotle was produced by Al-Himsi. The preface begins:

The first chapter of the book of Aristotle the philosopher, called in Greek ‘Theologia’, that is, ‘discourse on divinity’. The exposition of Porphyry of Syria, translated into Arabic by Ibn Na‘ima al-Himsi, and corrected for Ahmad ibn al-Mu‘tasim by al-Kindi.

Little else is known of al-Himsi; however, his place as a Christian translator of Greek philosophy into Arabic reveals that Christians were at the forefront of rendering Greek philosophy into Arabic. Al-Himsi, like the Syrian Christian Hunayn ibn Ishaq, were among the most able Arabic translators of their day. The reason for this is that Syrian Christians were conversant in Greek, Syrian, and Arabic and therefore were more qualified for preparing Greek and Syrian texts into Arabic editions. Notably, Syriac Christians preserved this great philosophical texts in Arabic, which were then later rendered into Latin for European Christians beginning in the twelfth century.
