= Ghulam Ahmad Faroghi =

Indian scholar

Hafiz Ghulam Ahmad Faroghi
- Ghulam Ahmad Faroghi with his father Ghulam Mansoor
- Born: July 31, 1861; Tijara
- Died: September 26, 1919 (aged 58)
- Occupation: Scholar
- Known for: Scholarship
- Children: Mohammad Zubair, Abdussalam, Zohra Begum, Bilqees Begum, Marghoobun Nisan, Masood Jahan, Abdur Raqeeb, Abdul Hasib and Mastoor Jahan
- Mother: Amarun Nisan

Hafiz Ghulam Ahmad Faroghi (1861–1919) was a scholar of repute of Arabic and Persian language at Bhopal state. He was first appointed as 'Head Maulvi' at Sulaimania School and then worked as a teacher at Jahangiria School. These two schools were very famous for affluent class during the princely state of Bhopal.

== Biography ==
Ghulam Ahmad was born in Tijara on 22 Muharram 1278 AH/ 1861 AD. At the age of 6 years in 1867, he came to Bhopal with his father Ghulam Mansoor. He learned the Quran by heart at the age of 9 years. Apart from his father, he took tutoring from Maulana Fida Ali Farigh Moradabadi. He was appointed a teacher in the Madrasa Farsi at Jahangirabad, Bhopal and then 'Head Maulvi' at Sulaimania School. He also taught at Jahangiria School.

Although he is not famous as a physician, he treated many patients. He had a pharmacy shop at Mohallah Ibrahimpura and used to prepare many compound drugs. Many drugs of his prescriptions are mentioned in the "Bayaz" of Hakim Syed Karam Husain.

== Books ==
As a scholar, he authored many books which were prescribed as text books in various schools. He also authored five dictionaries in the field of education at the pattern of Ḳhāliq Bārī, a versified glossary of Persian, Arabic, and Hindawi words and phrases attributed to Amir Khusrow:

Five dictionaries:

1. Faiz Shah Jahani
2. Nisab BeNazir
3. Hayat Azizi
4. Qadir Nama Faroghi
5. Nazr-i Sultani

== Teaching and students ==
He was against of taking tutoring at home. Nawab Sultan Jahan Begum wanted him to accompany Nawab Hamidullah Khan at Muhammadan Anglo-Oriental College, Aligarh for education as a Persian teacher, but Ghulam Ahmad Faroghi denied. Similarly, Mir Bakshi who was a strong (Faujdar) at the Bhopal state requested him to teach Arabic and Persian for his son. After his denial, Mir Bakshi started sending his son to Ghulam Ahmad Faroghi in a Baggi (a type of horse-drawn vehicle) along with Artillery Sepoys as a guard.

Again when his services were requested to teach outside the school by General Muhammad Ubaidullah Khan for his sons Wahiduzzafar Khan and Saeeduz Zafar Khan, he remarked "I don’t sell teaching and go to any home". Major-General Al-Haj Mohsin ul-Mulk, Nawab Hafiz Muhammad Ubaidu'llah Khan Sahib Bahadur, CSI was Brigadier and Commander-in-Chief of the Bhopal State Forces and Imperial Service Troops.

Ghulam Ahmad Faroghi had many students. Several learned scholars were turned up as his students. To name a few, Abdul Jalil Mail Naqvi, Maulvi Ibrahim Khalil, Maulvi Haji Ahsan Husain (Head master Jahangiria School), Master Shiv Dayal (Head master Model School), Master Gya Prasad, Liaqat Husain (District Judge), Muniruddin Munir, Vakil Mohammad Ismail Ramzi Tirmizi, Narbada Prasad Nigam (Personal secretary of the Prime Minister Raja Sarwadh Narain), Maulvi Mazhar Hasan Adhami (Caliph Ashraf Ali Thanwi) and Aizazudddin, etc.

"Syed Muhammad Yusuf Qasar writes that among his friends were his teachers Ghulam Ahmad Faroghi and Maulvi Abdul Qadir Nazim. Faroghi was Head Maulvi of Jahangiria High School. He had a small book shop also, where Barkatullah used to visit in the evenings. He wore long kurta, pyjama and sadri"

The State of Bhopal is fortunate in having had Rulers who have been deeply interested in the advancement of education among the people. The first regular school in the State was opened in the year 1860, and about ten years later it was decided by the Durbar that the people might be induced to have their children instructed even in primary knowledge if they were to publish an order that appointments to positions in the State departments would not thereafter be given to any individuals who had not obtained a certificate from a recognised college of school. A Regulation to that effect was actually issued, and progress was noted almost immediately afterwards. The principal educational institution at the present time is the Sulaimania High School, affiliated to the University of Allahabad, in which instructions is given in the Persian, Urdu, and Hindi languages, and in the text of the Koran. The students are more than 800 in number. The Alexandra High School has a daily attendance roll of about 185 youths, and the good work performed by the teachers is apparent from the satisfactory percentage of pupils who have been successful in matriculation examinations. The institution in which English was first taught in Bhopal is the Jahangiria School, in which there are about 320 pupils. There are also the "Madrassa Ahmadia", specially reserved for instruction in religious subjects; the Victoria Girls' School, erected in 1891 and the Sultania School, for daughters of parents in good positions, which has a large number of pupils on the rolls. There are also 75 primary schools, a medical school for instruction in the Unani system of medicine and surgery, and an Art School, commenced in 1905, for the purpose of enabling widows and destitute women to earn a decent livelihood

== Marriage and children ==
He was first married to Imtiazi Begum (daughter of Qazi Wahiduddin, Kotwal, Ajmer), at the age of 12 years at Tijara on 22 Shawwal 1390 AH/1873 AD. Mohammad Zubair, Abussalam, Mukhtar Jahan, Bilqees Begum, Marghoobun Nisan and Masood Jahan were born. With second wife (Maboobun Nisan), Abdur Raqeeb, Abdul Haseeb and Mastoor Jahan were born. Thus, he had nine children.

1. Mohammad Zubair (died on 15 Safar 1385 AH / 1965 AD on Wednesday) was married to his cousin Mumtaz Begum (daughter of Riyazi Begum). He left India and migrated to Medina on 9 Shawwal 1354 AH / 5 January 1936.
2. Abussalam (1897 – February 1977) was married to Abida and Jamila Salam and had one son Mohammad Ikram (21 March 1919 – 17 September 1982).
3. Mukhtar Jahan was married to Liaquat Hussain and had one daughter Hashimi Begum (wife of Dr. Qazi Jamaluddin ibn Qazi Fayyazuddin). After the death of Mukhtar Jahan, Liaquat Hussain remarried with Nazeer Begum with whom, two daughters were born namely Basheeran Bano (wife of Mohammad Siddiq) and Raoufa Bano (wife of Syed Ahmad Hasan Jafri).
4. Bilqees Begum was married to Irshad Husain
5. Marghoobun Nisan was married to Sufi Riyaz Mustafa of Bulandshahr
6. Masood Jahan was married to Haji Mohammad Yunus
7. Abdur Raqeeb
8. Abdul Haseeb
9. Mastoor Jahan was married to Hafiz Qazi Nasimuddin

== Death ==
He died on 30 Dhu al-Hijjah 1337 AH / 1919 AD and is buried at the graveyard Jhadda, Jahangirabad, Bhopal.

== See also ==
- Ghulam Mansoor (father)
- Hafiz Mazhar Husain
- Kabiruddin 'Kalim'
