= Rufus of Ephesus =

Late 1st and early 2nd century Greek physician

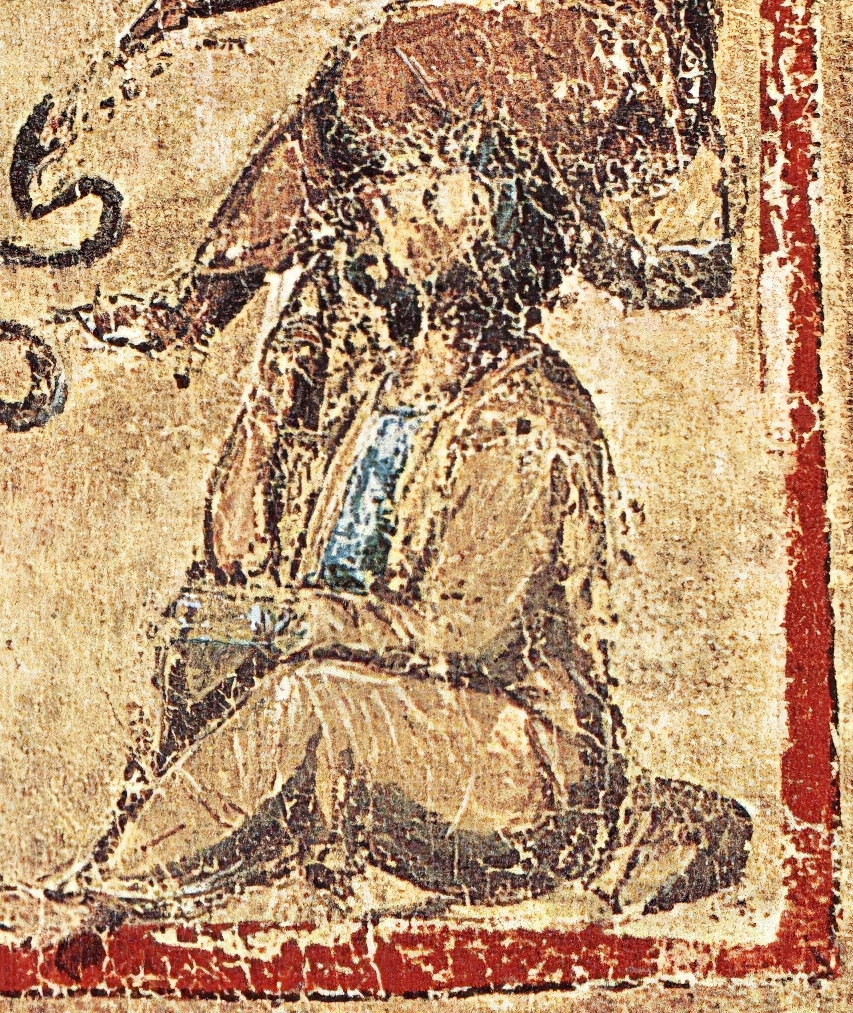
- Rufus of Ephesus, miniature of doctors in the Vienna Dioscurides
- Born: c. 70 AD; Ephesus (modern-day Selçuk, İzmir, Turkey)
- Died: c. 110 AD
- Occupation: Physician

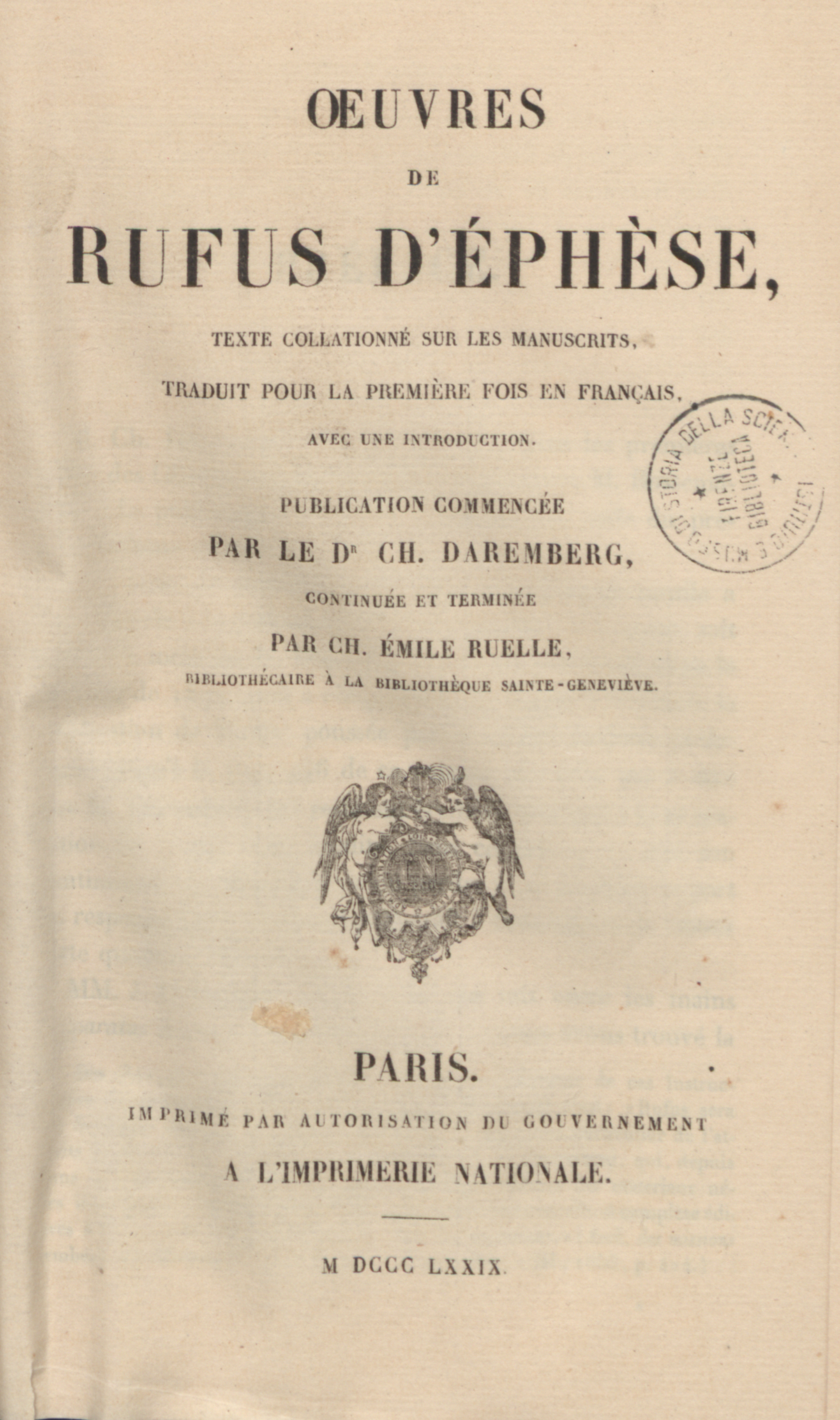
Oeuvres de Rufus d'Éphèse (Works of Rufus of Ephesus), 1879

Rufus of Ephesus (Greek: Ῥοῦφος ὁ Ἐφέσιος, fl. late 1st and early 2nd centuries AD) was a Greek physician and author who wrote treatises on dietetics, pathology, anatomy, gynaecology, and patient care. He was an admirer of Hippocrates, although he at times criticized or departed from that author's teachings. While several of his writings survive in full and have been critically edited, most are fragmentary and lack critical editions. His writings explore subjects often neglected by other authors, such as the treatment of slaves and the elderly. He was particularly influential in the East, and some of his works survive only in Arabic. His teachings emphasize the importance of anatomy and seek pragmatic approaches to diagnosis and treatment.

== Life ==
Little is known about Rufus's life. According to the Suda, he lived in the time of Trajan (98–117), which is probably correct, as Rufus quotes Zeuxis and Dioscorides, and is himself quoted by Galen. He probably studied at Alexandria, for he makes personal comments about the citizenry's general health and specific diseases. He may then have established himself at Ephesus, which was a centre of the medical profession.

== Works ==
Although Rufus was a voluminous author, the majority of his works no longer survive in full. The most recent attempt to publish his corpus as a whole remains C. Daremberg and E. Ruelle's Oeuvres de Rufus d'Éphèse: texte collationé sur les manuscrits, traduits pour la première fois en français, avec une introduction (1879). Important studies of Rufus' corpus were subsequently published in the 20th century by Johannes Ilberg and Alexander Sideras.

Rufus' principal work on anatomy was entitled On the Names of the Parts of the Human Body. The work contains valuable information about the state of anatomical science before the time of Galen. Rufus considered the spleen to be absolutely useless. He intimated that the recurrent nerves were then recently discovered, saying "The ancients called the arteries of the neck carotid, because they believed that when they were pressed hard, the animal became sleepy and lost its voice; but in our age it has been discovered that this accident does not proceed from pressing upon these arteries, but upon the nerves contiguous to them." He showed that the nerves proceed from the brain, and he divided them into two classes, those of the senses and those of motion. He considered the heart to be the seat of life, and noticed that the left ventricle is smaller and thicker than the right.

The names of nearly one hundred works have been preserved by Galen, the Suda, and especially by authors writing in Arabic, who appear to have translated or had access to Arabic translations of all of his works. Ibn al-Nadim and Ibn Abī Uṣaybiʿa both preserve a similar list of books by Rufus of Ephesus, though Ibn Abī Uṣaybiʿa reports more titles than Ibn al-Nadim. Most of his works have been lost. His surviving works include:

- On the Names of the Parts of the Human Body
- On Diseases of the Bladder and Kidneys (1977 CMG Greek text)
- On Satyriasis and Gonorrhea
- Medical Questions
- On Gout (in Latin)
- On Nabidh (in Arabic)
- On Jaundice (in Latin and Arabic)
- Case histories (in Arabic)
- On Melancholy (Fragments from other authors)

Some of this lost works include:

- On Regimen
- On Ancient Medicine
- On the Diet of Seafarers
- On Harmful Drugs
- On Injuries to the Limbs
- On Milk

His short treatise Medical Questions, is valuable because its advice on how a doctor can gain information from a patient through questions offers a glimpse into the bedside manner of ancient physicians. Arabic writers have also preserved numerous fragments from his self-help manual For Laypeople (Πρὸς τοὺς ἰδιώτας). Other fragments of his lost works are preserved by Galen, Oribasius, Aëtius, Rhazes and Ibn al-Baitar. Rufus also provided commentary on some of the works of Hippocrates, and he was said by Galen to have been a diligent student of them, and to have always endeavored to preserve the ancient readings of the text.

Qusta ibn Luqa translated another treatise, on Nabidh, into Arabic. Ibn Menduria Isfahani also edited ‘Risalah al Nabidh’. Fuat Sezgin stated that a copy of the manuscript ‘Risalah al Nabidh’ is extant at present only in the Library of University of Aleppo. But another copy of this manuscript is also preserved in the Library of Ibn Sina Academy of Medieval Medicine and Sciences. This second copy of the manuscript ‘Risalah al Nabidh’ dated 1745 AD was derived from another manuscript dated 1291 AD which was based on an earlier translation by Qusta ibn Luqa from the original text on Nabidh by Rufus of Ephesus. Hakim Syed Zillur Rahman edited the second copy of the manuscript ‘Risalah al Nabidh’ dated 1745 AD with translation and detailed commentary.

== Works mentioned by Ibn Abī Uṣaybiʿa ==
The following titles are mentioned by Ibn Abī Uṣaybiʿa (The Best Accounts of the Classes of Physicians 4.1.10.2):

1. On Melancholy (K. al-Mālankhūliyā), written in two books.
2. A work in forty books.
3. On Naming the Parts of the Body (K. tasmiyat aʿḍāʾ al-insān).
4. The Disease of Rabies (Maqālah fī ʿillah allatī yaʿriḍu maʿahā al-fazaʿ min al-māʾ).
5. Jaundice and Yellow Bile (M. Fī al-yaraqān wa-l-marār).
6. Gout (M. Fī al-amrāḍ allatī taʿriḍu fī l-mafāṣil).
7. On the Reduction of the Flesh (M. Fī tanqīṣ al-laḥm).
8. Regimen for those Lacking Physicians (K. Tadbīr man lā yaḥḍuruhu al-ṭabīb), in two books.
9. On Severe Throat Conditions (M. Fī l-dhubḥah).
10. The Medicine of Hippocrates (K. Ṭibb Abuqrāṭ).
11. On the Use of Wine (M. Fī stiʿmāl al-sharāb).
12. The Treatment of Infertile Women (M. Fī ʿilāj allawātī lā yaḥbalna).
13. Precepts to Preserve Health (M. Fī qaḍāyā ḥifẓ al-ṣiḥḥah).
14. Epilepsy (M. Fī l-ṣarʿ).
15. On Quartan Fevers (M. Fī l-ḥummā al-ribʿ).
16. Pleurisy and Pneumonia (M. Fī dhāt al-janb wa-dhāt al-riʾah).
17. On Regimen (M. Fī l-tadbīr), in two books.
18. On Coitus (K. al-Bāh), in one book.
19. On Medicine (K. al-Ṭibb), in one book.
20. Hospital Practices (M. Fī aʿmāl allatī tuʿmalu fī l-bīmāristānāt).
21. On Milk (M. Fī l-laban).
22. On Sects (M. Fī l-firaq).
23. On Virgins (M. Fī l-abkār).
24. Figs (M. Fī l-tīn).
25. The Traveller's Regimen (M. Fī tadbīr al-musāfir).
26. On Halitosis (M. Fī l-bakhar).
27. To Potamonianus, On Vomiting (M. kataba bihā ilā M-ā-ṭ-w-n-y-w-n fī l-qayʾ).
28. Lethal Drugs (M. Fī l-adwiyah al-qātilah).
29. Drugs to Treat the Illnesses of the Kidneys and the Bladder (M. Fī adwiyat ʿilal al-kulā wa-l-mathānah).
30. On Whether the Frequent Imbibing of Medicaments at Banquets is Beneficial (M. fī hal kathrat sharb al-dawāʾ fī l-walāʾim nāfiʿ).
31. Hard Swellings (M. Fī l-awrām al-ṣulbah).
32. On Memory (M. Fī l-ḥifẓ).
33. The Disease of Dionysius, i.e. Suppuration (M. Fī ʿillat Diyūnūsiyūs wa-huwa al-qayḥ).
34. On Wounds (M. Fī l-jarāḥāt).
35. Diet for the Elderly (M. Fī tadbīr al-shaykhūkhah).
36. The Advice of the Physicians (M. Fī waṣāyā al-aṭībbāʾ).
37. On Clysters (M. Fī l-ḥuqan).
38. On Childbirth (M. Fī l-wilādah).
39. On Luxation (M. Fī l-khalʿ).
40. The Treatment of Amenorrhea (M. Fī iḥtibās al-ṭamth).
41. Chronic Diseases according to Hippocrates (M. Fī l-amrāḍ al-muzminah ʿalā raʾy Abuqrāṭ).
42. Classes of Drugs (M. Fī marātib al-adwiyah).
43. Questions Physicians Must Ask Patients (M. Fīmā yanbaghī li-l-ṭabīb an yasʾala ʿan al-ʿalīl).
44. On Raising Children (M. Fī tarbiyat al-aṭfāl).
45. Vertigo (M. Fī dawarān al-raʾs).
46. On Urine (M. Fī l-bawl).
47. The Drug Named Liquorice (M. Fī l-ʿaqqār alladhī yudʿā sūsan)
48. On the Congestion of the Lungs (M. Fī l-nuzlah ilā l-riʾah).
49. Chronic Diseases of the Liver (M. Fī ʿilal al-kibd al-muzminah).
50. On the Occurrence of Shortness of Breath in Men (Fī annahu yaʿriḍu li-l-rijāl inqiṭāʿ al-tanaffus).
51. On Purchasing Slaves (M. Fī shirā l-mamālīk).
52. The Treatment of Epileptic Children (M. Fī ʿilāj ṣabī yuṣraʿu).
53. Diet for Pregnant Women (M. Fī tadbīr al-ḥabālā).
54. On Indigestion (M. Fī l-tukhamah).
55. On Rue (M. Fī l-sadhāb).
56. On Sweating (M. Fī l-ʿaraq).
57. Intestinal Obstruction (M. Fī īlāws).
58. On Epilepsy (M. Fī ʾ-b l-m-s-ī-ā).
