= Bakshi Ghulam Haider =

Khan Bahadur Bakshi Ghulam Haider Khan (died 1828 AD) was Faujdar of a unit at the time of Battle of Assaye, which was a major battle of the Second Anglo-Maratha War under the command of Major General Arthur Wellesley (Duke of Wellington). Latterly, he became the royal chief head of the military services hence called the Mir Bakshi. He was in charge of intelligence gathering, and also made recommendations to the royal court for military appointments and promotions.

== Services ==
Khan Bahadur Bakshi Ghulam Haider Khan was first employed with Nizam of Hyderabad. He then joined army and became Faujdar. He fought in the Battle of Assaye, which was a major battle of the Second Anglo-Maratha War under the command of Major General Arthur Wellesley (Duke of Wellington). Because of his services in the army under the command of (Duke of Wellington), he was awarded the title 'Khan Bahadur' and a land of 1400 Bigha at Rewari. He was latterly employed with Appa Sahib alias Mudhoji II Bhonsle. In 1817, he vehemently opposed the action of Appa Sahib when he was conspiring against British forces; as a result Appa Sahib was deposed and forwarded to Allahabad in custody, while Khan Bahadur Bakshi Ghulam Haider Khan was placed as 'Kamidan', a commandant in the army. He remained on this post for 12 years after the deposition of Mudhoji II Bhonsle.

== Family history ==
His ancestor 'Shaikh Umaruddin' came to India along with the caravan of Sultan Shahabuddin Muhammad Ghori and settled at Sultanpur, near the River Sutlej and River Bayas. His sons went to Delhi and deputed as Mufti at Rewari. This profession remained in their family for centuries. Khan Bahadur Bakshi Ghulam Haider Khan was the son of Mufti Noorul Haq ibn Amanul Haq.

=== Brothers ===
He had three brothers: Ghulam Hussain, Amanul Haq, and Mohibul Haq. Mohibul Haq was the judge at Nagpur state. Amanul Haq during the reign of Akbar Shah II (King of Delhi) took service with Raghoji II Bhonsle (Raja of Nagpur) and served him for many years. He had eight sons: Shamsul Haq, Sanaul Haq, Zafar Ali Khan, Abdul Ali Khan, Imdad Hussain, Ghulam Yahya, Fazlul Haq and Ahsanul Haq. Zafar Ali Khan was the Subahdar for nine years at Nagpur and received 6000 rupees annually as salary. After his death, his all five sons got pensions. His one son, Inayat Ali Khan received pension of rupees 600 against the services in army and for the same reason, he remained Honorary Magistrate at Rewari, District Gurgaon. The second son of Amanul Haq, Abdul Ali Khan was Risaldar in one of the Punjab regimentduring 1857 War of Independence. The son of Sanaul Haq, Mohib Hussain Khan became Subahdar of Bhandara, near Nagpur. In 1853, when Britishers took over Nagpur, he was appointed as Extra-Assistant Commissioner. He died in 1870. His son Nooruddin Hussain Khan was Risaldar at Nagpur for many years and another son, Moizuddin Hussain Khan was employed at Nizam of Hyderabad.

=== Children ===
Sardar Tafazzul Hussain Khan

He had four sons: Ghulam Mohammad Khan, Khairat Ali Khan, Jeevan Ali Khan and Auz Ali Khan. Three of his sons were employed in the army of the States of Nagpur. After his death, his elder son Ghulam Mohamad Khan (died 1833 AD) latterly became the 'Kamidan' in his place. Sardar Bahadur Tafazzul Hussain Khan was the son of Ghulam Mohamad Khan.

== See also ==
- Ghulam Mansoor
