= Ghulam Mansoor =

- Ghulam Mansoor with his son Ghulam Ahmad Faroghi
- Occupation: Faujdar
- Known for: Subedar-Major
- Children: Abdul Ghafoor, Ghulam Ahmad Faroghi

Ghulam Mansoor (b. 1227 AH / c. AD 1812) was Subedar-Major in 1867 at Bhopal State.

== Biography ==
Ghulam Mansoor was a scholar of repute in both Arabic and Persian. He was a member of the Maratha army during rule of Maharaja Senasaheb Subha Chhatrapati Raghuji Bapusaheb Bhonsle III of princely state of Nagpur (1818–1853). In 1252 AH / 1836 AD, he visited Tijara, built wells and replanted many trees inside the Big Bagh. In 1263 AH / 1845 AD, he left the services from Nagpur and shifted to Tijara. In Nagpur, his relative had a Risala (mounted troop) of 100 horse riders with Naqqara and Nishān (insignia). Later on after some months, he with some other relatives, joined 15th Battalion of Punjab Regiment. Roughly 10 years until 1271 AH / 1855 AD, he remained posted at Lahore, Peshawar, and other cities of Panjab. In 1856, when Britisher captured Awadh, he also remained at Cantonment of Sultanpur. After retirement from army, he finally settled at Tijara.

While staying in Tijara, he updated a very historical book "Miratun Nisab" of his forefather Ghulam Mohammad, who published the same about 75 years ago. This book is based on family history and has genealogy of many family members. He started this book in the era of Maharaja Shivdan Singh of Alwar in 1275 AH / 1858 AD and completed in Shawwal 1276 AH / 1859 AD.

In 1284 AH / 1867 AD, he moved to Bhopal, where he was appointed as Subedar-Major in 1867 of the Bhopal State army. After serving several years at Bhopal, he again came back to Tijara and died .

== Family history ==
Hākim-e Shariah Shareef Qazi-e Aazam ibn Qazi Ziauddin of Pinangwan was 'Qazi Qadaa' (authority to appoint Qazi). Akbar on 4 Jumada al-Thani 976 AH / 1568 awarded him 2000 Bigha Arazi Swad at Tijara. Qazi Mahmood (died 1005 AH / 1596 AD) was the son of Hākim-e Shariah Shareef Qazi-e Aazam. His brother Mohammad Hashim, his son Abdul Hafeez and grandson Ghulam Naqsh Band had also received many Firman (decree) like Qazi Mahmood. Qazi Ibrahim son of Qazi Mahmood was also 'Qazi Qadaa' at Tijara. Shahjahan awarded him Firman (decree) first on 22 Dhu al-Hijjah 1054 AH (Juloos 18) and second on 19 Ramadan 1055 AH. Some parts of his ruined haveli is still seen at Tijara. He died on 5 Moharram 1074 AH / 1665 AD. Qazi Abdul Baqi son of Qazi Ibrahim had also close relations with the Durbar of Aurangzeb and had given him charge of appointing 'Qazi' at Tijara. As per the Firman (decree) of Aurangzeb sealed by 'Sadr Sadoor Abid Khan', he was awarded Sanad of Qadaa. He also built various orchards and Havelis like Haveli Kalan, Deewan Khana, Kothi Bagh etc. at Tijara. He had business of horses from Arabian breed. The main gates at the Qazi Mohallah were built by him. In the archive of Tahsil Tijara, dated 1070 AH shows the 'Mafi Bagh' in the name of Qazi Abdul Baqi.

Qazi Abdul Baqi had two sons Qazi Ghulam Mohiuddin and Qazi Ghulam Murtaza and died on 30 Jumada al-awwal 1113 AH / 1701 AD. The elder daughter of Qazi Abdul Baqi was married to Abu Saeed bin Abdul Ghaffar of Sakras, while the younger daughter Khwanda Daulat Bint was married to Syed Chajju of Mohina. Syed Chajju had four daughters and four sons Syed Zainuddin, Syed Tajuddin, Syed Imamuddin and Syed Shamsuddin. Syed Zainuddin was married to Ummatullah daughter of Qazi Ghulam Murtaza of Tijara. Syed Tajuddin was married to Halima, daughter of Abdul Hadi ibn Qazi Ibrahim. One daughter of Syed Chajju was married to Syed Abdul Wajid Risaldar of Syed Sarai, Rewari. Syed Mohammad Ashraf Risaldar was his son. Syed Mohammad Ashraf had two sons Syed Yusuf Ali Khan and Syed Saeed Ali Khan. Syed Yusuf Ali Khan had one son Syed Hasan Askari Khan while Syed Saeed Ali Khan had two sons Syed Ahmad Hussain Khan and Syed Qasim Hussain Khan.

Syed Yusuf Ali Khan's one Diwan (poetry) in Urdu is extant in the library of Raza Library, Rampur and another Diwan (poetry) in Hindi vernacular is extant in the Khuda Bakhsh Oriental Library, Patna. In the book, 'Tarikh-i Mohammadi ‘ his name is mentioned as one of the important Emirs during the reign of Mohammad Azam Shah. Syed Yusuf Ali Khan was first married to Sharfun Nisan daughter of Ghulam Hussain (brother of Kartalab Khan Qazi Ghulam Mustafa) and had one daughter (married to Syed Mohammad Jalal). With second wife, Syed Hasan Askari Khan was born.

Noorullah was the son of Qazi Ghulam Murtaza, and married to Kafia, sister of Mirza Salar Beg ibn Allah Dost Beg (brother Diwan Idris Mohammad). The other sons of Qazi Ghulam Murtaza were Qazi Mohammad Muqtada, Moizuddin and Abu Turab. Qazi Ghulam Muqtada was married to the daughter of Syed Mohammad Baqar of Sakras and had one son Karimuddin.

The brother of Qazi Abdul Baqi, Abdul Hadi was employed in army.

Bibi Ruqaiya had two sons Mohammad Akram and Mohammad Mukram. Mohammad Akram was married to the daughter of Qazi Badruddin ibn Qazi Ghulam Mohiuddin. Qazi Ghulam Mohiuddin like his father Qazi Abdul Baqi got the Firman (decree) sealed by 'Sadr Sadoor Rizvi Khan', he was awarded Sanad of Qadaa. He had two sons Qazi Badruddin and Ghulam Mahmood.

=== Qazi Badruddin ===
Qazi Badruddin had two sons – Qazi Mohammad Mah and Mohammad Sultan Khan.

Qazi Mohammad Mah was first attached to the rule of Nawab Amir Khan Bahadur and then in the court of Nawab Bahadur aka Jawed Khan at some higher post. Lastly, he was appointed again at some higher post at Rewari by Raja Nagar Mal 'Ummadul Mulk'. Rewari at that time was jagir of Raja Nagar Mal. When Sikhs attacked Rewari and captured the whole area, he with Shaikh Yar Mohammad Khan (Sardar of Maharaja) and elder son Qazi Mohammad Aman, died during fighting inside the Haveli of Rao Gujar Mal on 22 Rajab 1179 AH / 1765 AD. In this same fight with Sikhs, Qazi Ali Mardan ibn Qazi Ghulam Naqshband of Rewari was also died in his Haveli. The whole city was ravaged. Arrangement to bury the dead bodies could not be made. The young son of Qazi Mohammad Mah, Mohammad Ata was detained with other family members inside the fort of Gogulgarh and could not come out. By chance, from the same route, Mohammad Saleh ibn Mohammad Sultan Khan, was returning from Ziyarat Hazrat Khwaja Buzurg Ajmeri of Quds Sarah and informed about the incident in Tijara. The relatives from Tijara went to Rewari secretly and brought the dead bodies of Qazi Mohammad Mah and his son Qazi Mohammad Aman (also entitled 'Khan'). They were then buried after seven days on 28 Rajab near Takya Shah Abdul Majeed at the big Bagh. Qazi Mohammad Ata (died on 14 Rajab 1206 AH / 1791 AD) had one daughter Amaratun Nisan (married to Jamal Mohammad ibn Ghulam Mahmood) and two sons Qazi Najibuddin and Qazi Fasihuddin (d. 7 Jumada al-awwal 1242 AH / 1826). Both first worked in Nagpur and then Ajmer. Jamal Mohammad had one son Tahawar Ali.

Mohammad Sultan (son of Qazi Badruddin) was Mansabdar (3,000) and entitled with 'Khan' by Mughal emperor Muhammad Shah. He was first attached to the court of Baluch and then joined the services at Nawab Bahadur aka Jawed Khan. After the death of Nawab Bahadur, he joined as 'Mansab Buland' in the court of Raja Nagar Mal 'Ummadul Mulk'. He also built a Haveli at Mohalla Qazi Wada, Tijara. He was married to Bibi Mohtarma (d. 10 Rabi' al-awwal 1204 AH / 1789 AD; daughter of Mufti Mohammad Raza of Rewari) and had one daughter Jamiatun Nisan and three sons – Mohammad Saleh, Hafiz Abul Barkat and Mohammd Saeed. These three brothers had big Risala (Risaldar).

Mohammad Saleh was great fighter and got martyred between the fight of Ehtishamud daula Nawab Ismail Beg Khan and Nawab Zulfiqarud daula Mirza Najaf Quli Khan. Mohammad Saleh was in the side of Nawab Ismail Khan. His body was taken to Tijara. The son of Mohammad Saleh Mohammad Asghar was quite a religious person. His son and grandson, Abul Karim and Haji Rafiuddin was great scholars and owned a big library. One of the manuscripts with his signature is extant in the library of Ibn Sina Academy of Medieval Medicine and Sciences. Haji Rafiuddin after marrying Qutubun Nisan had one son Haji Abdul Matin Khan

Hafiz Abul Barkat held important positions at Awadh and Deccan. Initially he was employed with Raja Nagar Mal and then served thirteen years in the court of Asaf-Ud-Dowlah with Mian Sahib Ilyas Ali Khan. Many Sowar were in his command. In Hyderabad also, he was employed with some relatives and posted at higher posts. He died in Golconda on 21 Ramadan 1219 AH / 1804 AD, where his grave was constructed by his son-in-law Ghulam Mohammad. His wife Bibi Zafarun Nisan died on 17 Dhu al-Hijjah 1259 AH / 1853 AD in Tijara.

Mohammad Saeed got martyred near Dekhail, Rohtak on 6 Rabi' al-thani 1208 AH / 1793 AD when he was employed with Rai Hari Shamshir Jang Bahadur.

=== Ghulam Mahmood ===
Ghulam Mahmood was born in Sha'aban 1120 AH / 1708 AD. After formal education, he remained first in the court of Burhanul Mulk Nawab Sadat Ali Khan and then Wazirul Mumalik Nawab Safdar Jang and finally with Nawab Wazir Shujauddaula with his 90 relatives from Pinangwan, Palwal, Rewari and Tijara. He was also a great scholar and physician. Many of his prescriptions are written in the Bayaz of Hakim Syed Karam Husain. He was married to Bibi Sanjida (died Muharram 1203 AH / 1788 AD) and had one son Ghulam Mohammad (born on 10 Shahban 1157 AH / 1744 AD).

Ghulam Mohammad was a scholar and physician like his father. He authored 'Miratun Nisab' based on family history. A copy of this manuscript dated 1202 AH / 1787 AD is extant in the library of Ibn Sina Academy of Medieval Medicine and Sciences. He remained in army and posted at Awadh, Hyderabad Deccan and Ajmer. In Awadh, he was employed in the court of Qasim Khan Mandal. He laid foundation of his Haveli in Tijara on 19 Rabi' al-awwal 1196 AH / 1781 AD which got completed in two years. He died in Ajmer on 1 Ramdan 1219 AH / 1804 AD. His grave is located at Takya, Gate Akbari, Ajmer. He had three sons Ghulam Masood, Ghulam Rasool and Ghulam Nabi.

Ghulam Masood (born 28 Jamadi awwal 1205 AH / 1790 AD) was employed in Ajmer and Nagpur. Lastly, he settled in Tijara. Ghulam Mansoor was his son.

Ghulam Nabi was very brave, good built and intelligent person. He kept interest in pharmacy and Spahigiri. He lived mostly in Nagpur and latterly joined 5th regiment of British India. He died in Tijara on 17 Rabi' al-awwal 1293 AH / 1876 AD at the age of 83 years. He was married to Najabun Nisan, daughter of Qazi Husain Ali at Jharsa(now a village at Gurgaon and had four sons Abdul Ghani, Ghulam Nasir, Wali Mohammad and Imtiaz Ali.

1. Abdul Ghani (born on 7 Muharram 1241 AH / 1824 AD). He was employed in the 11th regiment. After separation from army in 1856 at Lucknow, he raised voices against Britishers. He participated as a part of Indian Rebellion of 1857. On 6 Safar 1274 AH / 1856 AD, he along with other horse riders jumped into the Gomti River and drowned. He was 32 years old.
2. Ghulam Nasir (born on 26 Shawwal 1249 AH / 1833 AD). He was also employed in the 11th regiment along with his elder brother Abdul Ghani. On 6 Safar 1274 AH / 1856 AD, he along with his brother and other horse riders jumped into the Gomti River but came out safely. He remained hidden in Tijara after running from Lucknow and also died in Tijara. He was expert in Spahigiri, archery and swimming. He was married to Maryamun Nisan (daughter of Ghulam Husain ibn Qazi Qutubuddin) at Jharsa(now a village at Gurgaon and had two sons Zakiruddin 'Zaki' and Kabiruddin 'Kalim'.
3. Wali Mohammad (born 28 Dhu al-Qi'dah 1252 AH / 1836 AD)
4. Imtiaz Ali (born 4 Muharram 1254 AH / 1837 AD). He was married to Hakimun Nisan (daughter of Mufti Yaqinuddin ibn Mufti Haji Imamuddin). He was first employed in Nagpur and then in Bhopal in 1299 AH / 1881 AD. He died on 29 Ramadan 1300 AH / 1882.

== Marriage and children ==
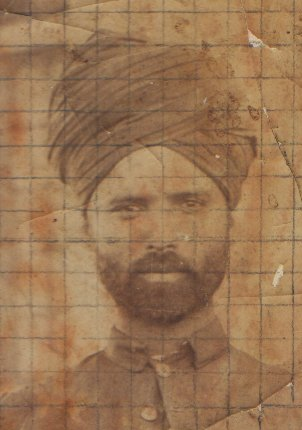
Liaquat Hussain 'Sheda'

Ghulam Mansoor was married when he was 17 years on 24 Rajab 1253 AH / 1837 AD to his distant cousin Amarun Nisan (daughter of Qazi Ghulam Mohiuddin). He had two sons Abdul Ghafoor (b. 7 Ramadan 1263 AH / 1846 AD) and Hafiz Ghulam Ahmad Faroghi (b. 22 Muharram 1278 AH / 1860 AD) and two daughters Mahmoodun Nisan (b. 4 Jumada al-awwal 1269 AH / 1852 AD) and Makhdoomun Nisan (b. 10 Jumada al-Thani 1271 AH / 1854 AD).

Elder son Abdul Ghafoor was married to Bayazun Nisan (daughter of Hussainuddin). Reyazi Begum was his daughter.

The younger son Hafiz Ghulam Ahmad Faroghi

Makhdoomun Nisan was married to Abdul Qadeer ibn Fariduddin ibn Qazi Hisamuddin on 11 Ramdan 1283 AH / 1866 AD. She had one daughter Hakimun Nisan (married to Hakim Syed Karam Husain) and two sons Abdul Jalil and Ghulam Jilani.

Mahmoodun Nisan was married to Abid Hussain Abid. Abid Hussain 'Abid' was the youngest son of Ghulam Mehdi ibn Ghulam Askari ibn Salahuddin; also a nephew (sister's son) of Ghulam Mansoor. He was born on 21 Rabi' al-awwal 1265 AH/ 1848 AD, and was famous Urdu / Persian poet. More of his poetry was in Persian. He was 'Nazir' means 'Manager' in the Adalat Sadrus Sudoor. He did Hajj twice times. During the second Hajj, he was accompanied by Nawab Sultan Jahan Begum. He was resident of Khatla Pura, Bhopal. He died in 1922. He was married to his cousin Mahmoodun Nisan (daughter of Ghulam Mansoor). He was not only the uncle (Khalu) of Hakimun Nisan (wife of Hakim Syed Karam Husain but also the cousin of Makhdoomun Nisan (mother of Hakimun Nisan). He had three sons – Tajjamul Hussain 'Akhtar', Liaquat Hussain 'Sheda' and Ali Hasan 'Khandan' and two daughters Mahboon Nisan and Umrao Begum. These three sons were famous poets of Bhopal.

- Ghulam Mehdi (born 10 Rajab 1226 AH / 1811 AD) was married in 1243 AH / 1828 AD with Latifun Nisan (4 Jumada al-awwal 1232 AH / 1816 AD – 23 Jumada al-awwal 1283 AD / 1866 AD).
- Tajjamul Hussain 'Akhtar' was the natural poet. He was also the student of Ghulam Ahmad Faroghi. He authored many books including Khaliq Bari (published in 1313 AH / 1895 AD). He died 12 days before the death of his father Abid Hussain 'Abid' in 1910 due to Black fever. He was born in 1295 AH / 1878 AD and married to Zabidun Nisan (daughter of Ghulam Husain ibn Ghulam Askari). She died in Tijara. Haider Husain 'Hami' (born 1892) was his one son – a great Urdu and Persian poet and Khatoon Jahan was his daughter. Khatoon Jahan was married to Basheeruddin Haider son of Alauddin Haider ibn Mohammad Sirajuddin Haider Khan (Jagirdar of Farrukhnagar).
- Liaquat Hussain 'Sheda' (died 12 Rabi' al-awwal 1349 AH / 1944 AD) was a famous Urdu poet like his father and brothers 'Akhtar' and 'Khandan'. He was first married to Mukhtar Jahan (daughter of Ghulam Ahmad Faroghi) and had one daughter Hashimi Begum (wife of Dr. Qazi Jamaluddin ibn Qazi Fayyazuddin). After the death of Mukhtar Jahan, Liaquat Hussain married again with Nazeer Begum with whom, one son, Zafar Hussain Alvi and two daughters were born namely Basheeran Bano (wife of Mohammad Siddiq) and Raoufa Bano (wife of Syed Ahmad Hasan Jafri).
- Ali Hasan 'Khandan' was also a poet of humour. He died on 27 Rabi' al-awwal 1361 AH / 13 April 1946. His wife died before him on 28 Ramadan 1354 AH / 2 December 1937. He had one son 'Makki' and two daughters namely Mehmooda Begum (married to Nazeer Hussain, son of Irshad Ali and Bilqees Jahan) and Afsari Begum.
- Yadgar Husain 'Fitna' was the nephew of Abid Hussain Abid and son of Qasim Husain. Qasim Husain was married to the daughter of Sardar Bahadur Tafazzul Hussain Khan. Qasim Husain was later on settled in Nagpur with his family including father-in-law. Yadgar Husain 'Fitna' was born in Nagpur 7 days after the death of his father. He was brought up by his grandfather Ghulam Mehdi.

== See also ==
- Qazi Syed Inayatullah
- Hafiz Mazhar Husain
