= Hakim Abdul Aziz =

Unani physician in India (1855–1911)

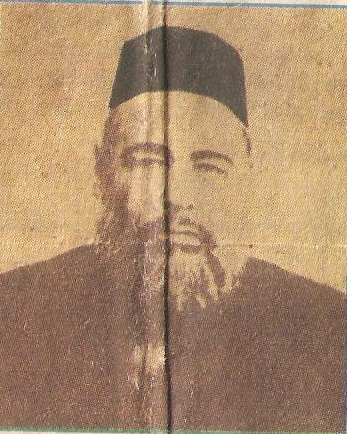
- Photograph of Hakim Abdul Aziz
- Born: 1855; Lucknow, Oudh State
- Died: 1911 (aged 55–56); Lucknow, British Raj
- Resting place: Jhawai tola, Lucknow
- Occupation: Unani physician
- Years active: 1877–1911
- Known for: Philosophy of Unani medicine, Free treatment, anti-adulteration
- Style: Puritan Unani system
- Board member of: Committee for Regulation of Medical Formulations
- Relatives: Grandfather of Mohammad Shakeel

Hakim Abdul Aziz (Muhammad 'Abd al 'Aziz; 1855–1911) was a prominent Unani physician in British India.

== Biography ==
Hakim Abdul Aziz was born into a family of Kashmiri migrants, and is regarded as the founder of the Lucknow tradition in Unani medicine. He started practising medicine in 1877. In 1902, he founded the Takmil al Tibb School at Lucknow for research and excellence in Unani Medicine.

The earliest biographical work on Hakim Abdul Aziz and his philosophical approach in Unani medicine was written by Hakim Syed Zillur Rahman. He wrote memoirs and life history of 'Azizi Family', prescriptions and formulations of Hakim Abdul Waheed, Unani formularies used by Azizi Family of Lucknow.

== Epistemology ==
Abdul Aziz’s approach with regards to Unani medicine was that of a puritan and hence, significantly different from other notable practitioners like Hakim Ajmal Khan who advocated incorporation of concepts from alternative medical systems. Consequently, the Delhi and Lucknow schools of Unani medicine evolved in different directions. Hakim Abdul Aziz wished to systematise Unani instruction at the Lucknow Madrasa around the texts of Ibn Sìnà, supplemented by practical instruction in surgery and anatomy.

== Impact ==
Hakim's fame was so widespread that students and practitioners of Unani medicine from as far and wide as the Punjab, Afghanistan, Balochistan, Bukhara and the Hejaz came to study with him. The Takmil al Tibb School (established by him at Lucknow) was instrumental in combating the widespread plague of 1902–03.

Coming to terms with the singular promotion of colonialism to allopathic medicine, in 1910 Hakim Abdul Aziz and Hakim Ajmal Khan and Pandit Madan Mohan Malviya formed the All India Ayurvedic and Unani Tibb Conference to defend traditional forms of healing. In 1904, recognizing the Hakim's stringent attitude towards adulteration in medicine, British India invited him to serve on the board of the Committee for Regulation of Medical Formulations.

Hakim Abdul Aziz did not charge visiting patients, though it is recorded that he solicited fees of 16 rupees for visits within the city, 500 rupees for visits outside the city, and 1000 rupees for visits outside the state. Among his royal patients were Shahjahan Begum of Bhopal and the son of Sayajirao Gaekwad III of Baroda.

== Legacy ==
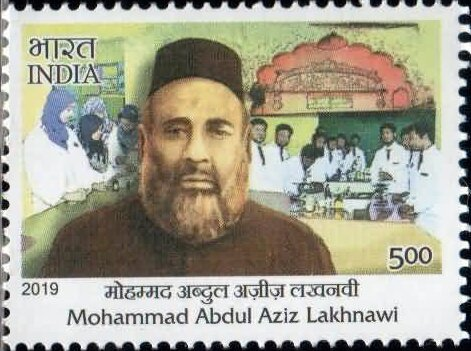
Stamp of India 2019 Muhammad Abdul Aziz Lakhnawi

In 1910, shortly after returning from Hajj, the Hakim fell ill and died. His death was widely mourned by poets, journalists and commoners. After his death, his two eldest sons took over the maintenance of Takmil al Tibb. A road in Lucknow is named after him (Abdul Aziz Road), and the college is now maintained by the government. The Azizi family is still involved in practice of Unani medicine. The Azizi Family also played a significant role in the Indian independence movement.

Hakim Syed Zillur Rahman published his Tazkirah Khandan Azizi in 1978. The work was widely received and reviewed. Similarly, his earlier Bayaz Wahidi (1974) and Matab Murtaish (1976) were also reviewed in many Urdu journals.

== See also ==
- Hakim Mohammed Said
- Hakim Syed Karam Husain
- Hakim Ajmal Khan

== Literature ==
- Tazkirah Khandan Azizi by Hakim Syed Zillur Rahman, (First edition 1978), Shifaul Mulk Memorial Committee, Aligarh, 472 pp; (Second revised edition 2009) ISBN 978-81-906070-6-3, Ibn Sina Academy, Aligarh, 458 pp.
- The Azizi Family of Physicians by Tazimuddin Siddiqui and Hakim Syed Zillur Rahman, (1983), Studies in History of Medicine, Jamia Hamdard, New Delhi, 93 pp.
- Bayaz Waheedi by Hakim Syed Zillur Rahman, (1974), Shifaul Mulk Memorial Committee, Aligarh, 228pp, (Second edition 1991), Tibbi Academy, Aligarh, 224 pp.
- Matab Murtaish by Hakim Syed Zillur Rahman, (1976), Shifaul Mulk Memorial Committee, Aligarh, 230 pp.
- Maqalat Shifaul Mulk Hakim Abdul Latif by Hakim Syed Zillur Rahman, (2002), Publication Division, Aligarh Muslim University, Aligarh, pp 324.
- Tajideed-i Tibb by Shifa-al Mulk Hakim Abdul Latif, (1972), Tibbi Academy, Aligarh.
- Shifaul Mulk Hakim Abdul Latif (Nuqush wa Tassurat) by Hakim Mohammed Aslam Siddiqui (1985), Educational Book House, Aligarh.
- Listing at the Open Library Archive
- Shifa-al Mulk Hakim Abdul Latif by Hakim Syed Zillur Rahman, Daily Dawat, Delhi, 24 Jun 1971.
- Shifa-al Mulk Hakim Abdul Latif by Hakim Syed Zillur Rahman, Fikr-o-Nazar, Namwaran-i Aligarh, Vol. 1, Jan. 1987-Jul. 1988, pp. 361–70.
- Shifa-al Mulk Hakim Abdul Latif Falsafi by Hakim Syed Zillur Rahman, Bazm-e-Wafa, Aligarh Muslim University Old Boys' Association, Lucknow Branch, 1998, pp. 50–54.

== See also ==
- Unani medicine
- Hakim Ajmal Khan
- Jamia Hamdard
- Avicenna
- Mohammad Shakeel
