= ʽImad Shirazi =

Persian physician

ʽImad al-Din Maẖmud ibn Masʽud Shirazi (عمادالدین محمود بن مسعود شیرازی) was a mid-16th-century Persian physician from Shiraz, Iran.

He studied medicine with his father in Shiraz and taught a number of students himself. Early in his career he was in the service of the governor of Shirvan, during which time he incurred the governor's wrath, for which he received the punishment of spending one night outdoors in the cold and snow. ‘Imad al-Din Mahmud Shirazi resorted to opium during that night, and, although he recovered from the immediate effects of the cold, he had a tremor for the rest of his life. He became an opium-eater (afyuni), convinced of the therapeutic value of opium.

Reflecting his own experience, ‘Imad al-Din Mahmud Shirazi wrote a treatise in Persian on the medical and addictive properties of opium and its use in compound remedies. The National Library of Medicine has a copy of this treatise that was made in Kerman in 1591, possibly during the author's lifetime or shortly thereafter. Another copy of this 16th-century Persian manuscript scribed between 1737 and 1744 is extant in the Library of Ibn Sina Academy of Medieval Medicine and Sciences.

‘Imad al-Din Mahmud Shirazi also composed the first Persian-language monograph on syphilis and an important treatise on China root (chub-i chini), the rhizome of an Old World species of smilax found in eastern Asia and advocated for the treatment of syphilis. In Arabic, he wrote a treatise on compound remedies and a monograph on anatomy. Early modern European influence can be seen in many of these medical writings.

== Sources ==
For his life and writings, see:

- Hakim Syed Zillur Rahman, Imad al-Din Mahmud Shirazi, Studies in History of Medicine and Science, IHMMR, New Delhi, India, Vol. 9, No. 1-2, 1985, pp. 15–21.
- Hakim Syed Zillur Rahman, Imad al-Din Mahmud Shirazi - Shakhsiat wa Fun, Mujalla Uloom-e Islamia, Aligarh Muslim University, Aligarh, India, 1985.
- C.A. Storey, Persian Literature: A Bio-Bibliographical Survey. Volume II, Part 1: A. Mathematics, B. Weights and Measures, C. Astronomy and Astrology, D. Geography (London: Luzac, 1958), p. 241-4 no. 411
- Cyril Elgood, A Medical History of Persia and the Eastern Caliphate (Cambridge: Cambridge University Press, 1951; reprinted Amsterdam: APA-Academic Publishers, 1979), pp. 379–82.
- Cyril Elgood, Safavid Medical Practice, or The Practice of Medicine, Surgery and Gynaecology n Persia between 1500 AD and 1750 AD (London: Luzac, 1970), pp. 21–24.
- Emilie Savage-Smith, Emad-al-Din Mahmud Sirazi in Encyclopædia Iranica, ed. Ehsan Yarshater, 6+ vols. (London: Routledge & Kegan Paul and Costa Mesa: Mazda, 1983 to present), vol. 8, pp. 381–2.

== See also ==
- List of Iranian scientists
