= Nabidh =

Traditional fermented drink from the Arabian Peninsula

Nabīdh (Arabic: نبيذ [naˈbiːð]) is a traditional fermented drink from the Arabian Peninsula typically made from dates steeped in water, although it can also be made with dried grapes (raisins). Nabidh is usually non-intoxicating, but if left for a certain period of time, it can turn mildly intoxicating, or heavily intoxicating depending on the level of fermentation.

Nabidh is known to increase alcoholic content to intoxication levels, depending on the surrounding conditions. As alcohol is considered haram by the majority of modern Muslims, Nabidh is only fermented for a certain amount of time before it becomes alcohol. According to the hadith collection by Imam Malik Ibn Anas, it is forbidden to "prepare nabidh in a gourd or in a jug smeared with pitch" and forbade the mixture of fresh dates and grapes with raisins and dried dates.

== History ==
Rufus of Ephesus (fl. 100 AD) wrote a tract on the beverage nabīdh, which Qusta ibn Luqa in his times translated into Arabic by the name Risālah fī al-Nabīdh. In 2007, after collecting and collating copies of this manuscript from different libraries around the world, Hakim Syed Zillur Rahman again reintroduced and published this rare work in Urdu and Arabic.

Arab writer Ibn Fadlan describes an encounter on the Volga with a people he calls "Rūsiyyah," who may have been either Russians or Vikings. He relates how the Rusiyyah would drink an alcoholic drink he refers to by the name "nabidh". It is not clear what drink it actually was, but from context it is clear that it was intoxicating.

In Modern Standard Arabic the meaning of nabidh has shifted to mean wine in general, replacing the Classical Arabic word for wine, khamr.

== See also ==
- Naqe'e Al Zabib
- Şıra
