= Dawakhana Shifaul Amraz =

Unani pharmaceutical company

Dawakhana Shifaul Amraz (Regd)
- Founded: 1894
- Founder: Hakim Syed Karam Husain
- Headquarters: Tijara, India

Dawakhana Shifaul Amraz (Regd), was a Unani pharmaceutical company established in 1894 at Tijara, India. It was one of the largest manufacturer of many Unani medicine before the partition of India.

== History ==
Dawakhana Shifaul Amraz was a registered Unani polyclinic and pharmaceutical company established in 1894 by Hakim Syed Karam Husain at Tijara, Rajputana, (Alwar). It was a flourishing Dawakhana until 1947. After the partition of India, it was relocated and moved to Jinsi Road, Jahangirabad, Bhopal. In 1975, another branch of the 'Dawakhana' was set up at Aligarh where it lasted till 1994. The main Dawakhana at Bhopal existed till the year 2000 AD.

=== Post Office Dawakhana ===
At Tijara, Dawakhana Shifaul Amraz grew to the extent in terms of the demand and distribution of its drugs that the Indian Postal Service, during the British rule of India, had to establish a separate post office at the premises of the Dawakhana itself. A British postmaster Mr. Bolard (Superintendent Post Offices, Rajputana) and Superintendent Maulvi Sabihuddin (Latterly became Post Master General, Panjab Circle) visited Dawakhana and approved its need.

It was established in 1930 and existed till August 1947. It was unique attempt at that time granted to any private company. Many prescription letters and registered parcels including Value Payable Posts (VPP) were dispatched from this Dawakhana Post Office to different cities and countries. This exclusive postal service also worked as an additional post office at the city of Tijara.

=== Monthly periodical ===
Dawakhana Shifaul Amraz under the editorship of Hakim Syed Karam Husain started a monthly 24 pages periodical in the name of 'Masiha-e Zaman' in January 1927. During those days, it was very difficult to issue a periodical from any princely state of India. The publication of 'Masiha-e Zaman' owed the intervention of Alwar Government and the political agent of Rajputana Agency.

It covered literary articles, news, debates and other information on complementary and alternative medicines especially Unani medicine. On 27 August 1928, Maharaja Jai Singh Prabhakar praised the issue of this periodical, which on his behalf, Pandit Ram Bhadr Adhyaji, 'Juditional Minister' of Alwar state honoured after reading it.

Maulana Hakim Mufti Abdur Rahim (Mufti-e Ala, Alwar State) and Syed Shabbir Hussain Akhtar Alwari while reviewing 'Masiha-e Zaman' praised the efforts of Hakim Syed Karam Hussain. Similarly, some literary magazines like 'Al Hakim' (Monthly from Lahore), 'Jamia' (Monthly from Delhi) and 'Maarif' (Monthly from Azamgarh) published reviews of this periodical.

The price of the periodical was Indian Rupees Two. Since there was no printing press at Tijara, Dawakhana published this periodical in 5000 copies first from 'Hindustan Electric Printing Works' (Delhi) and then from 'Matba Abul Alai' (Agra) and 'Mahboobul Matabi' (Delhi). It continuously published for 18 years and eventually stopped publishing in 1944 due to printing difficulties.

Qazi Faizuddin, Mir Mumtaz Ali, Shabir Husain Akhtar, Qazi Abul Hasan Wahidi were closely attached to the Dawakhana particularly with its publication of 'Masih-e Zaman'.

== Consulting physicians ==
A team of consulting Unani practitioners used to examine patients and disperse some patented Unani medicines of the Dawakhana. Prominent physicians of the team were Hakim Syed Karam Husain (1870–1953), Hakim Mohammad Mubin Ahmad (1901–1963), Hafiz Hakim Syed Atiqul Qadir (1909–2000), Hakim Syed Fazlur Rahman (1912–1994) and Hakim Syed Zillur Rahman (b. 1940). They reviewed large number of patients as per the principles of traditional system of Unani medicines and prescribed their own patented medicine.

Hakim Muhammad Mubin Ahmad in 1947 migrated to Pakistan and settled at Tando Allahyar, where he gained both name and fame in Unani practice. He came back to India on 27 August 1963, where due to heart attack on 18 September 1963, collapsed and died. He is buried near the grave of his maternal uncle Hakim Syed Karam Husain. His children and grandchildren are settled in Pakistan.

Physicians at Dawakhana Shifaul Amraz:

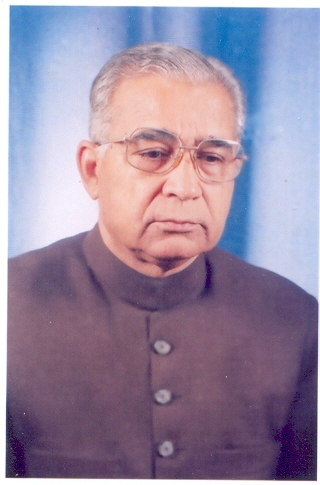
Hakim Syed Zillur Rahman (b. 1 July 1940)

== See also ==
- Hamdard (Wakf) Laboratories
- Hamdard Laboratories (Waqf)
- Ibn Sina Academy of Medieval Medicine and Sciences
