= Johannes Ilberg =

German medical historian and classical philologist (1860–1930)

Johannes Ilberg (10 July 1860 in Magdeburg – 20 August 1930 in Leipzig) was a German educator and classical philologist who was the author of numerous works on ancient Greek medicine. His father, Hugo Ilberg (1828–1883), was a Gymnasium director and his uncle, Friedrich von Ilberg (1858–1916), was a personal physician to Kaiser Wilhelm II.

== Biography ==
Ilberg studied philology, archaeology, history and philosophy in Leipzig, Bonn and Berlin. At the University of Bonn, he was greatly influenced by the philologist Hermann Usener. At the University of Leipzig, he received his doctorate under the sponsorship of Otto Ribbeck. Later on, he was a Gymnasium rector in Wurzen (from 1910), Chemnitz (from 1914) and at the Queen Carola Gymnasium in Leipzig (1916–24). He was co-editor (from 1897) and editor (1914–1929) of the educational series Neuen Jahrbücher für das klassische Altertum, Geschichte und deutsche Literatur, a publication that was also referred to as Ilbergs Jahrbücher ("Ilberg's Yearbook"). In 1925, it was renamed Neuen Jahrbücher für Wissenschaft und Jugendbildung.

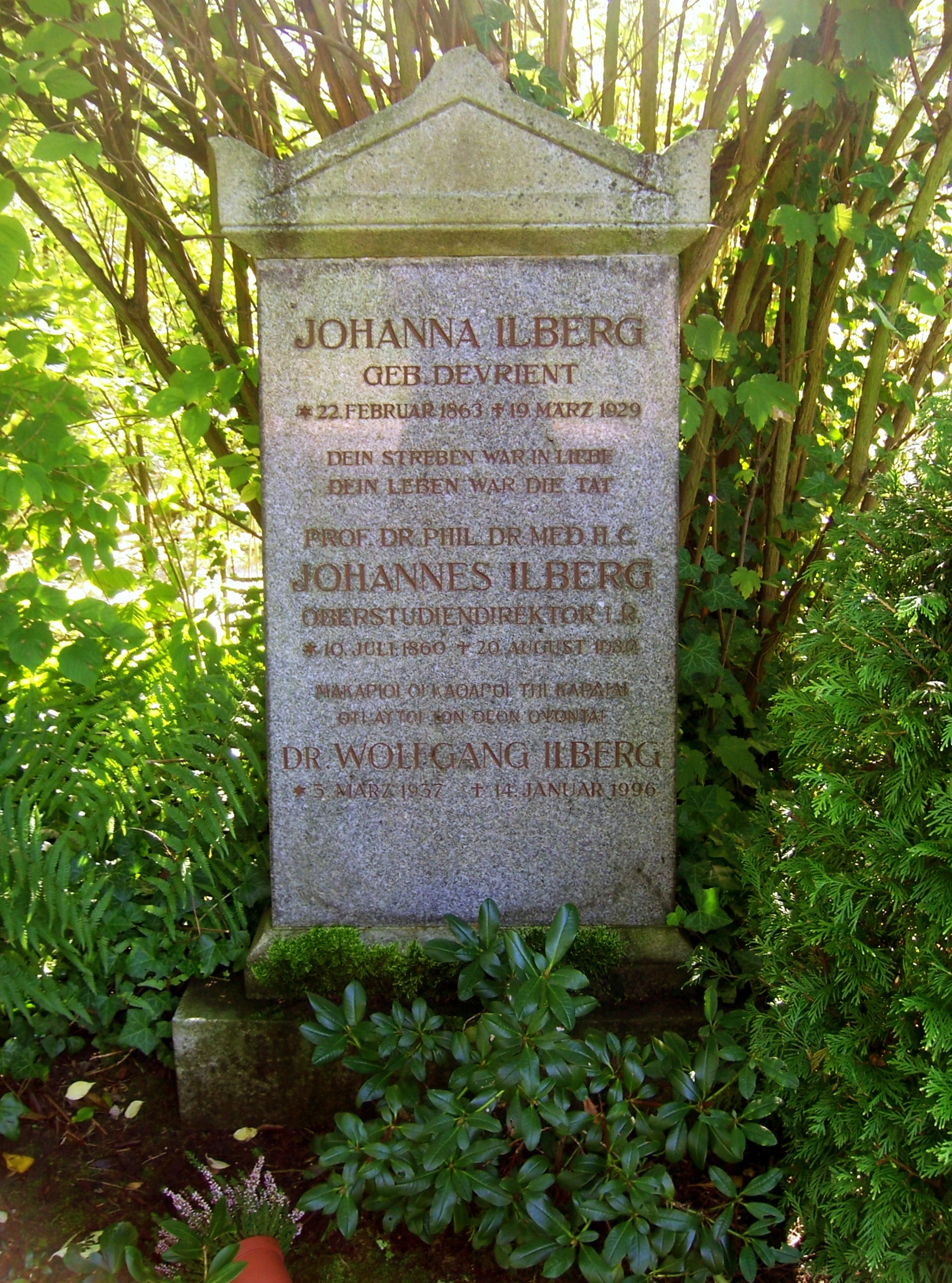
Gravesite of Ilberg at Südfriedhof in Leipzig

== Published works ==
- Das Hippokrates-Glossar des Erotianos und seine ursprüngliche Gestalt, 1893 – The Hippocratic glossary of Erotianos.
- Hippocratis Opera quae feruntur omnia, 1894-1902 (2 volumes, with Hugo Kühlewein).
- Die Sphinx in der griechischen Kunst und Sage, 1896 – The sphinx in Greek art and legend.
- Aus Galens Praxis; ein Kulturbild aus der römischen Kaiserzeit, 1905 – On Galen's experience; a cultural image of the Roman Empire.
- Zwei vorträge zur Geschichte der Antiken Medizin, 1909 (with Max Wellmann) – Two lectures on the history of ancient medicine.
- Die Überlieferung der Gynäkologie des Soranos von Ephesos, 1910 – The tradition of gynaecology involving Soranus of Ephesus.
- Rufus von Ephesos, ein griechischer Arzt in trajanischer Zeit, 1930 – Rufus of Ephesus, a Greek physician in the Trajanic period.

Ilberg was the author of numerous articles in Wilhelm Heinrich Roscher's "Ausführliches Lexikon der griechischen und römischen Mythologie" (Concise dictionary of Greek and Roman mythology).
