= Qusta ibn Luqa =

Lebanese physician and philosopher (820–912)

Qusṭā ibn Lūqā al‐Baʿlabakkī قُسطا ابن لُوقا البعلبکی
- Born: 820; Baalbek, Abbasid Caliphate, now Baalbek District, Beqaa Governorate, Lebanon
- Died: 912 (aged 92); Armenia
- Occupations: Physician, scientist, translator
- Writing career
- Years active: 840–912
- Period: Abbasid period
- Notable works: Risalah fī Auja Al Niqris, Rislah fī al Nabidh, Kitāb fī al‐ʿamal bi‐ʾl-kura al‐nujūmiyya, Hayʾat al‐aflāk, Kitāb al‐Madkhal ilā ʿilm al‐nujūm, Kitāb al‐Madkhal ilā al‐hayʾa wa‐ḥarakāt al‐aflāk wa‐ʾl‐kawākib, Kitāb fī al‐ʿamal bi‐ʾl‐asṭurlāb al‐kurī, Kitāb fī al‐ʿamal bi‐ʾl‐kura dhāt al‐kursī,

Qusta ibn Luqa (قسطا ابن لوقا, "Costas son of Luke"), also known as Costa ben Luca or Constabulus (820–912) was a Melkite Christian physician, philosopher, astronomer, mathematician and translator. He was born in Baalbek. Travelling to parts of the Byzantine Empire, he brought back Greek texts and translated them into Arabic.

== Personal life ==
Qusta ibn Luqa al-Ba'albakki originated from Baalbek (or Heliopolis), now in Lebanon. A Melkite Christian, he was born in 820 and flourished in Baghdad. He was a philosopher, physician, mathematician and astronomer. He died in Armenia, likely circa 912.

== Translations ==
Qusta ibn Luqa produced, personally revised, or supervised the translations of a number of works. These include works by Diophantus, Theodosius of Bithynia's Spherics, On Days and Nights, and On the places of habitation, Autolycus's On the moving sphere and On Risings and Settings, Hypsicles's On Ascensions, works by Aristarchus, Theophrastus’s Meteora, Galen’s catalogue of his books, Hero of Alexandria's Mechanics, and works by John Philoponus.

He wrote commentaries on Euclid and a treatise on the armillary sphere. He was a prominent figure in the Graeco-Arabic translation movement that reached its peak in the 9th century. At the request of wealthy and influential commissioners, Qusta translated works on astronomy, mathematics, mechanics and natural science from Greek into Arabic.

== Original works ==
More than 60 treatises are attributed to Qusta. He wrote mainly on medical subjects, but also on mathematics and astronomy. Only a small number of his works have been published. The extant editions of medical works show that he was thoroughly acquainted with Hippocratic-Galenic humoral medicine—the theoretical system that constituted the basis of formal medicine in Islam.

Qusta's works, many listed in the Fihrist of Ibn al-Nadim, dealt with contemporary science, medicine, astronomy and philosophy. A Latin translation of his work De Differentia Spiritus et Animae was one of the few works not attributed to Aristotle that was included in a list of ‘books to be read by the Masters of the Faculty of Arts, at Paris in 1254, as part of their study of Natural Philosophy. The work was translated by John of Seville (fl. 1140). He wrote a treatise on Nabidh. His Medical Regime for the Pilgrims to Mecca: The Risālā Fī Tadbīr Safar Al-ḥa is available in translation.

== Discoveries ==
Research in 2021 traces the discovery of pulmonary circulation to Qusta's book A Treatise on the Difference Between Spirit and Soul (Arabic: رسالة في الفرق بين الروح والنفس).

== Testimonials ==
Of him Ibn al-Nadim says: "He is an excellent translator; he knew well Greek, Syriac, and Arabic; he translated texts and corrected many translations. Many are his medical writings." Qusta was with Hunayn ibn Ishaq the author who best served Greek culture in the Arab civilization.

== Involvement with peers ==
He was also involved, with his fellow Christian Hunayn ibn Ishaq, in an epistolary exchange with the Muslim astronomer, Abu Isa Yahya ibn al-Munajjim, who had invited them to embrace Islam. Both refused, and provided their reasons for rejecting al-Munajjim's Islamic faith.

== Writings ==
- Risalah fī Auja Al Niqris رسالة في اوجاع النقرس by Qusta Ibn Luqa. A work on Gout. Edited with translation and commentary by Hakim Syed Zillur Rahman, Ibn Sina Academy of Medieval Medicine and Sciences, Aligarh, 2007 (ISBN 978-81-901362-8-0).
- Rislah fī al Nabidh (رسالة في النبيذ Arabic translation of Qusta ibn Luqa by Rufus. Edited with translation and commentary by Hakim Syed Zillur Rahman, Ibn Sina Academy of Medieval Medicine and Sciences, Aligarh, 2007 (ISBN 978-81-901362-7-3).
- Rîsâlah-i Nabîdh of Qustâ bin Lûqâ by Hakim Syed Zillur Rahman, A Persian translation of the previous work. Supplement to 'Studies in the History of Medicine and Science' (SHMS), Jamia Hamdard, Vol. IX(1985), pp. 185–201.
- Kitāb fī al‐ʿamal bi‐ʾl–kura al‐nujūmiyya (كتاب في العمل بالكرة النجومية On the use of the celestial globe; with some variations as to title), which contains 65 chapters and was widely disseminated through at least two Arabic recensions as well as Latin, Hebrew, Spanish, and Italian translations. The Latin translation is edited by R. Lorch - J. Martínez: Qusta ben Lucae De sphera uolubili, in Suhayl, vol. 5
- the extant astronomical work, Hayʾat al‐aflāk (هيئة الافلاك On the configuration of celestial bodies; Bodleian Library MS Arabic 879, Uri, p. 190), which is one of the earliest compositions in theoretical (hayʾa) astronomy
- Kitāb al‐Madkhal ilā ʿilm al‐nujūm (كتاب المدخل الى علم النجوم Introduction to the science of astronomy – astrology)
- Kitāb al‐Madkhal ilā al‐hayʾa wa‐ḥarakāt al‐aflāk wa‐ʾl‐kawākib (كتاب المدخل الى الهيئة و حركة الافلاك و الكواكب Introduction to the configuration and movements of celestial bodies and stars)
- Kitāb fī al‐ʿamal bi‐ʾl‐asṭurlāb al‐kurī (كتاب في العمل بالاسطرلاب الكري On the use of the spherical astrolabe; Leiden University Library MS Or. 51.2: Handlist, p. 12)
- Kitāb fī al‐ʿamal bi‐ʾl‐kura dhāt al‐kursī (كتاب في العمل بالكرة دات الكرسي On the use of the mounted celestial sphere). It is identical to Kitāb fī al‐ʿamal bi‐ʾl-kura al‐nujūmiyya mentioned above.
- The Introduction to Geometry. Translation and Commentary by Jan P. Hogendijk in Suhayl, vol. 8

== Influence ==
He was named (as Kusta Ben Luka) by the poet W. B. Yeats as a source for the ideas in the poet's philosophical treatise, A Vision.

== See also ==
- Latin translations of the 12th century
- Toledo School of Translators
- 10th century in Lebanon
