= Hakim Syed Karam Husain =

Indian Unani Physician (1870–1953)

- Hakim Syed Karam Hussain
- Born: Syed Karam Hussain; 1870; Tijara, Rajputana, (now Rajasthan)
- Died: 25 June 1953
- Known for: Unani medicine
- Spouse: Hakimun Nisa
- Children: Hafiz Hakim Syed Atiqul Qadir, Hakim Syed Fazlur Rahman
- Mother: Fayyazun Nisan

Hakim Syed Muhammad Karam Hussain (1870–25 June 1953) (Urdu: حکیم سید کرم حسین) was an Unani practitioner from Tijara, Alwar.

== Biography ==
=== Education ===
After initial education from his hometown 'Tijara', he moved to Meerut at the age of 14 years. In Meerut, he gained knowledge, proficiency and expertise in ‘Unani Tibb’ from two leading practitioners 'Hakim Mohammad Hasan Haziq' and 'Hakim Baldev Sahai'. Hakim Hasan Haziq (died 1928) was the author of many books on Unani medicine including 'Lataif-e Ghalib' from Naami Press, Meerut, while Hakim Baldev Sahai was himself a student of Hakim Ahsanullah Khan, prime minister and royal physician to Mughal Emperor Bahadur Shah Zafar.

=== Practicing Unani medicine ===
Hakim Syed Karam Husain started practicing Unani medicine at Tijara, Alwar in early 1893. He established his own Unani pharmaceutics, by the name of, Dawakhana Shifaul Amraz in 1894. He was a personal Unani physician of the Maharaja of Alwar, Jai Singh Prabhakar, (1882–1937) and had been a standing committee member of All India Unani and Ayurvedic Tibbi Conference, of which Hakim Ajmal Khan was the president.

Jai Singh Prabhakar once invited some significant Unani physicians working in the state of Alwar to discuss the future course, progress and promotion of Unani medicine. Hakim Syed Karam Hussain was the chief-de-mission of that delegation. In that delegation, the other physicians were: Hakim Syed Mohammad (Khairtal), Hakim Mohammad Sulaiman, Hakim Mohammad Umar Fasih, Hakim Imam Ali, Hakim Syed Ahmad Ali Akbarabadi and Hakim Ziauddin (Tijara).

=== Regional personality ===
He was popularly known as Rais-e Tijara, a very pious and religious person and a resident of Qazi Mohalla, of the Tijara city before the partition of India in 1947. He bought seven Havelis at Tijara including the 'Haveli Qadeem' (the oldest private mansion at the Qazi Mohalla). In addition, he had two other houses in Delhi. In the course of leisure moment, his favourite places of visit were Mount Abu and Delhi. The following Persian commemorative inscription can still be seen at the main entrance of his 'Haveli Qadeem' at Tijara:

بحمداللھ بدور شاہ اکبر

خلا ئق از غم ايا م وا رفت

بحکمش در تجارہ گشت بندے

کہ پيشش گنبد گردوں بود ست

Praise be the God, thou the 'Great Emperor'

Gone from the world of sorrow

By his order, took a stroll in Tijara

That he may take rest before reaching destination

[By "شاہ اکبر" (Shah Akbar), meaning both 'Emperor Akbar' and 'Great Emperor', the poet parallels God and Jalaluddin Muhammad Akbar, and asserts 'Great Emperor' to both].

The above qata was written at the time when Emperor Akbar visited Tijara while moving to Fatehpur Sikri from Delhi. According to Major P.W. Powlett (late settlement officer of Ulwar), "Akbar appears to have given some attention to Mewat in AH. 957 (A.D. 1579), he visited Ulwur (now Alwar) on his way to Fatehpur Sikri".

=== Community and social works ===
Being a well-off person in the region of Mewat, he assisted many community and social works by lending either monetary donation or moral support to many organisations such as 'Anjuman Khadimul Islam' (Alwar), 'Jamiat Markaziya Tabligh-ul-Islam' (Ambala), 'Anjuman-e-Himayat-e-Islam' / 'Anjuman-i-Himayat-i-Islam' (Lahore), 'Jamia Masjid' (Tijara) and 'Madrasa Islamia' (Tijara). Ghulam Bhik Nairang was the founder of 'Jamiat Markaziya Tabligh-ul-Islam' (Ambala). Hakim Syed Karam Husain also assisted Maulana Mohammad Ilyas in many occasions when he visited nearby towns of Mewat.

The plaque, with the name of 'Hakim Syed Karam Husain', found in a well of Jamia Masjid located at Bazaar during cleansing drive and is now preserved in the Jamia Masjid complex suggests that the main gate of the mosque (Sadar Darwaza) was once built by him. The mosque is believed to get damage during the Partition of India.

It is because of the influence of Hakim Karam Husain, that he brought Maharaja Jai Singh Prabhakar at Tijara to visit 'Madrasa Islamia' (Islamia School). Raja Ghazanfar Ali Khan, the then Education Minister at the State of Alwar and Maj General Fateh Naseeb Khan, the then Commander-in-chief of Alwar State Army, also accompanied with him. On the main gate of school, it was written.

My God save our king,

H.H. the good Jai Singh

On him be his best blessing

He also supported in the publication of books of other authors in both Unani and other literary works. To name a few Tibbi books, which acknowledge his name are 'Tarjuma Qarabadin Azam', 'Tarjuma Aqsarai', 'Tauzih al Advia', 'Ilajun Nisan', Afsana Hikmat', 'Tafaruqul Amraz was Tafaruqul Advia', 'Moonisul Atibba' and 'Usoole Sehat'. Similarly, he helped in the publication of general books such as 'Qutub al Madar Talifat Shikwah' by Maulana Syed Ali Shikwa nabirah Maulana Syed Shah Jurat Ali Arghwani of Makanpur, 'Swanehumri Kalyari' by Mohammad Ashiq Ali, 'Risalah Islahul Milad' by Maulana Qari Abdul Latif Khan (Teacher, Madrasa Aaliya, Agra), 'Gulzar Risalat wa Guldasta-e Shahadat' by Qazi Zakiruddin, 'Nasihatul Muslamin al Maroof Musaddas Kabiruddin' by Aziz Kabiruddin Kalim, 'Kashiful Asrar' by Peerji Ahmad Shah Rampuri, 'Masnawi Farishta Rahmat' and 'Anjam Mohabbat' by Maulana Hakim Mohammad Ahmad Alwari and 'Gulshan Sairul Mashhoor ba Yaadgar Darbar Alwar'. In addition, he got printed a copy of Quran from Gulzar Mohammadi Press, Meerut in 1889 (1307 AH).

=== Poetry ===
He had not only great interest in Urdu poetry, but also as a Pen name Natiq (Takhallus), composed many poems. He learned the art of poetry from his teacher 'Hakim Mohammad Hasan Haziq' and 'Isharat Ali Khan Sadq Meeruti'. He once acknowledged,

"Iss fun main shagird hoon Sadq Ka"

== Family history ==
Hakim Syed Karam Husain (1287AH/1870AD – 11th Shawwal 1372 AH/25 June 1953) was a direct descendant of Qazi Syed Rafi Mohammad. He was merely 8 years old when his father Qazi Mir Imdad Ali died. He was trained under the guidance of his mother, Fayyazun Nisan, who was a very talented woman. She inherited all the good qualities from her father, Hussainuddin (died on 11 Dhu al-Hijjah 1278 AH / 1861 AD), a man of horse business from Hyderabad. Hussainuddin also had a good taste in literature. Apart from Fayyazun Nisan, he had another daughter, Bayazun Nisan from his wife Siddiqun Nisan (daughter of Ghulam Askari Ibn Salahuddin ibn Karimuddin ibn Muqtada ibn Qazi Ghulam Murtaza).

With family members and friends, Karam Husain went for Hajj pilgrimage from Tijara in January 1934 (1354 AH). With him, his wife (Mrs. Hakimun Nisa), sister (Mrs. Anwari Begum), elder son (Hakim Syed Atiqul Qadir), and others such as Khwaja Kamaluddin (Alias Mian Kallan Shah), Qazi Saeeduddin and Mrs. Zaeefa Khatoon were there.

Many of his family members and relatives are remembered for their role and sacrifices in India's First War of Independence.

After his demise, he was laid to rest adjacent to the grave of his wife Hakimun Nisa, who herself died at the age of 81 years on 14th Rabiulawwal 1370 AH/1950AD, in his family graveyard located at Church Road, Mohallah Jinsi, Bhopal.

== Books ==
He was the author of many books some are published while some are extant as unpublished manuscript on Unani. Following is a list of published books:

- من موہنی الحب 'Man Mohnee' (Al-Hub).
- Taufah-e Jahan Maroof ba Keemiya-e Ishrat
- Nisab al Tibb al Maroof Tibbi Khaliq- Bari
- Risala Khizab
- Risala Khwas Aaq
- Risala Maqsood al Talib
- Mafatihul Ghaib
- Taskhir Khalaiq Tarjuma Kitab Aqdul Mohabbat
- Mafatihul Mominin
- Ramzanul Muslamin
- Risala Fazail al Haj
- Chahal Kaaf
- Darood Mastaghat
- Harz Murtazvi Maroof ba 'Duwai Saifi'
- Darbar Sultanul Hind
- Irshad-e Wahidi
- Tazkira Ahbab
- Jashne Maulood
- Kitab al Moalijat
- Bayaz-e Tibb
- Sharah-e Qasida Ghausiya
- Waqiful Ayub wa kashiful Qaloob al Maroof 'Masnavi Mutmain'
- Risala Qadm Shareef
- Safar Nama-e Haj

Apart from various books and monographs, he edited monthly periodical 'Masih-e Zaman' from 1926 to 1944. This periodical in 5000 copies was first printed from 'Hindustan Electric Printing Works' (Delhi) and then from 'Matba Abul Alai' (Agra) and 'Mahboobul Matabi' (Delhi). There was no printing press at Tijara, Alwar.

== Legacy ==
- Two sons – Hafiz Hakim Syed Atiqul Qadir (1909–2000) and Hakim Syed Fazlur Rahman (1912–1994), whom Hakim Syed Karam Husain trained the arts of Unani Tibb.
- A well-settled 'Dawakhana Shifaul Amraz'.

== See also ==
- Hakim Karam Husain Museum on History of Medicine and Sciences
- Tijara
- Hakim Syed Zillur Rahman (grandson)
- Syed Ziaur Rahman (great-grandson)
- Hafiz Mazhar Husain
- Ghulam Mansoor
- Ghulam Ahmad Faroghi
- Sardar Bahadur Tafazzul Hussain Khan
