= Kabiruddin Kalim =

Indian writer and social activist

Kabiruddin Kalim (1870 to 1952) was an Indian writer and social activist during the period of the Bhopal State.

== Biography ==
Kabiruddin Kalim was born in 1870. He belongs to a strong family history. His younger brother Zakiruddin Zaki was also an author.

Kalim was Bay'ah with Nizamuddin Husain, Sajjada nashin and Shah Neyaz Barelvi. He died in 1952 in Bhopal,

== Life as scholar ==
He authored more than two dozen books. His first Pen name was 'Mahir' and then adopted 'Kalim'. Apart from poems and novels, there are books on religion also. Most of his unpublished work was preserved with his son, Badrul Hasan. Following is the list of books that he authored.

- Minhajul Nabi Tafsir Sura Al Azha (Manzoom), 20 November 1923.
- Aina-e Islam (Manzoom), 23 March 1951
- Haqaiq Sura Bani Israil (Nasr), 19 November 1932
- Mahtab Nabuwat, 4 November 1948
- Miladun Nabi (Nasr)
- Badrul duja fi Ahwal Mustafa, 2 November 1941
- Mawazna Jung-i Uhad wa Maarka Karbala (Manzoom), 15 February 1922
- Hungama Fitrat Mukhzan Fitrat (Haqeeqat Waqeyat Karbala, Nasr)
- Haqiqatus Saman (Nasr), 16 September 1938
- Ghazliat Kalim
- Khamsa Jaat wa Musaddas
- Ganjina-i Kalim (Talatim Fitrat), 18 February 1952
- Masnavi Toor Kalim (Qissa Mah wa Khursheed), 10 February 1937
- Naghmat Hindi (Hindi Kalam)
- Dewaan-e-Kalim
- Kashmakash-e-Hayat (Manzoom), 13 October 1947
- Khuwab Jawani Maruf Ram Kahani (Manzoom), 11 November 1923
- Aqsaamul Insan (Nasr), 10 November 1925
- Muhabbat ka Phal, 3 March 1943
- Khuda ka Chor
- Husn Nadira, 15 September 1943
- Shrimati Chandrama, 4 April 1943
- Zaheer wa Zahra, 13 September 1943
- Josh Khoon, 3 May 1943
- Kismat ka Khel (2 parts)
- Dastan Aaina Jahan (Qissa Shahzada Badiuzzaman), 18 September 1944
- Shareer Mangetar, 24 January 1951
- Afsana Andalib Zaman wa Kishwar Jahan, Three Parts (1951–1952).
- Nasihatul Muslimeen (Musaddas Kabiruddin).

== See also ==
- Ghulam Mansoor
- Ghulam Ahmad Faroghi
- Zakiruddin 'Zaki'
