= Mohammad Shakeel =

Indian politician

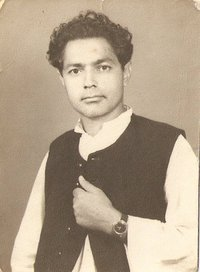

Member of the Uttar Pradesh Legislative Assembly for Lucknow West
- In office 1974–1979
- Preceded by: Syed Ali Zaheer
- Succeeded by: Zafar Ali Naqvi

Personal details
- Born: 1927 Lucknow, United Provinces of Agra and Oudh, British India
- Died: 24 December 2007 (aged 79–80) Lucknow, Uttar Pradesh, India
- Resting place: Lucknow
- Party: Indian National Congress
- Other political affiliations: Revolutionary Communist Party of India, Praja Socialist Party
- Spouse: Begum Akhtar Jehan
- Relations: son of Hakim Abdul Aziz
- Children: 3
- Occupation: Trade union activist
- Profession: Labour lawyer
- Committees: Executive Committee, Lucknow Municipal Corporation

M. Shakeel (full name: Mohammad Shakeel, alt: M Shakil) was an Indian freedom fighter, politician, Urdu novelist, trade union activist and labour lawyer from the city of Lucknow, India. Born in the famous Azizi family of physicians, he was the grandson of Hakim Abdul Aziz.

== Early life ==
Born in 1927, Shakeel joined the Indian National Movement in his youth, and was imprisoned by the British at the age of 14 years. Though released after 21 days, he was arrested several times again over the years for delivering inflammatory speeches. After the independence of India, Shakeel joined the Praja Socialist Party, and remained a companion of Jayaprakash Narayan, Ram Manohar Lohia and Acharya Kriplani. His wife, Begum Akhtar Jehan, was herself an educationist and principal of the Kashmiri Mohalla Girls' School.

== Political career ==
In 1960, Shakeel was elected to the first Lucknow Municipal Corporation, and undertook social work in establishing the Nakhas and Pratap Markets in Lucknow. After the dissolution of the Praja Socialist Party, Shakeel joined the Indian National Congress and won the 1974 Assembly elections from the densely populated Lucknow West constituency.

Shakeel continued to argue labour cases for farmers, and trade unions throughout his career. He also served as President of Bhartiya Khadya Nigam Mazdooor Sangh. In 1976, he was instrumental in getting the practice of contractual labour for public cooperatives being abolished by the courts in Uttar Pradesh.

== Legacy ==
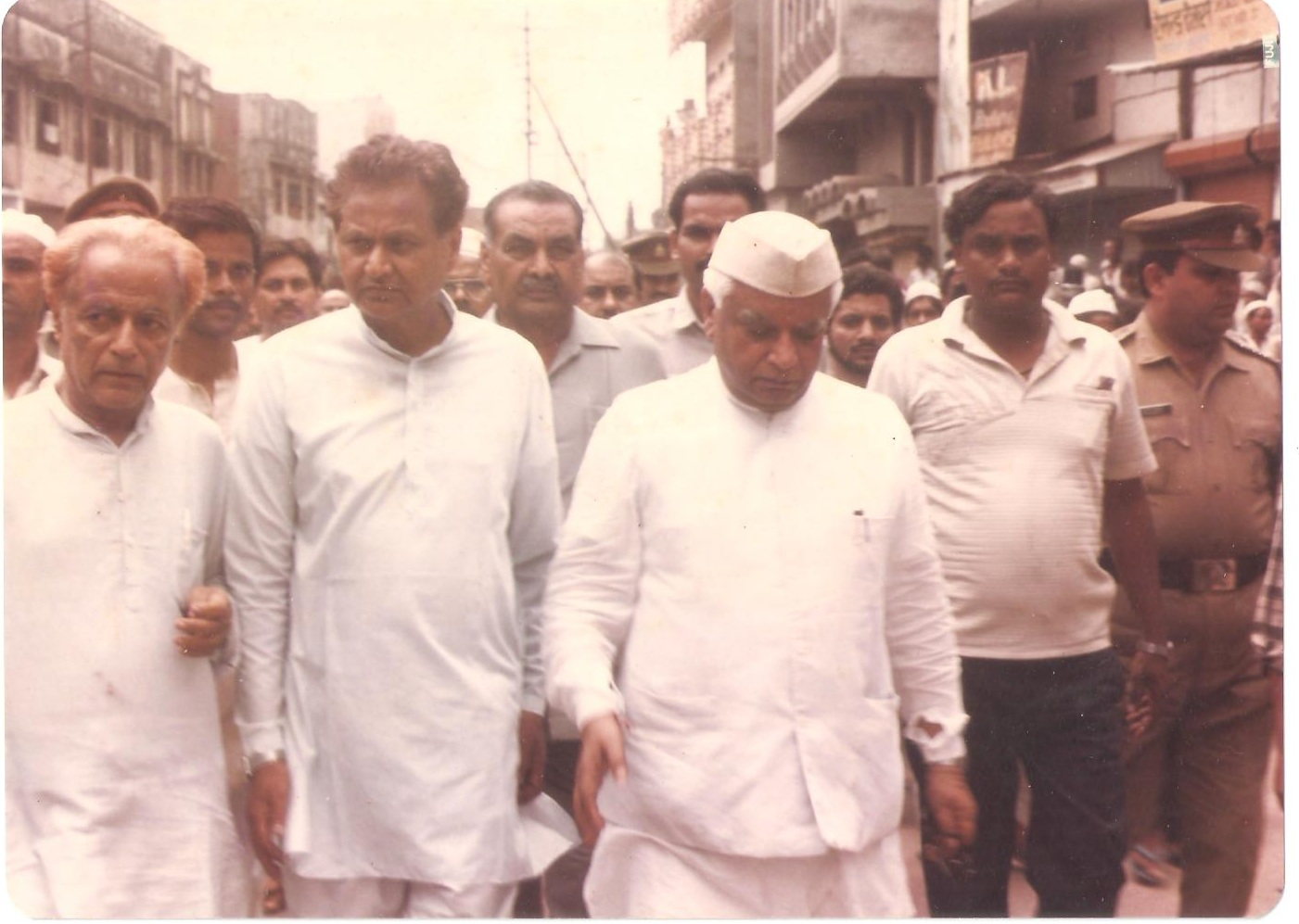
M Shakeel (1st left) leading a procession in Old Lucknow with the then Chief Minister ND Tiwari

Shakeel's works in Urdu poetry and literature have been published by Kitabi Duniya. In 2011, recognising Shakeel's immense contributions to Lucknow, a road was named after him in the Old City. This road lies next to another one named after his grandfather Hakim Abdul Aziz.

== See also ==
- List of people from Lucknow
- Indian National Congress
- Indian National Movement
