= Naqe'e Al Zabib =

Yemeni cold beverage, containing raisins

Naqe'e al zabib (Arabic: نقيع الزبيب, romanized: naqīʿ az-zabīb, lit. 'raisin infusion') is a raisin beverage from Yemen. It is similar to nabidh, a mildly alcoholic infusion that was consumed widely in pre-Islamic times. As alcohol is considered haram in Islam, both nabidh and naqe'e al zabib are fermented for a certain time before it is converted to alcohol.

To prepare the infusion the raisins are thoroughly washed, covered in hot water, and then left to soak for three hours before being pressed through a sieve to extract the juice. Other recipes recommend boiling the raisins or soaking the raisins in the refrigerator overnight before squeezing out the juice. Sometimes the raisins are boiled a second time after the overnight soaking.
