= Tafazzul Hussain Khan =

British Indian army officer (died 1868)

- Died: 1868
- Known for: Risaldar
- Awards: Sardar Bahadur and Captain

Tafazzul Hussain Khan (died 5 Muharram 1284 AH / 1868 AD) was a key army personnel during the 1857 revolt. He was Risaldar of a mounted troop (Risala) during 1857 Indian revolt and was entitled, 'Captain' and 'Sardar Bahadur' by British India.

== Family history ==
He was the grandson of Bakshi Ghulam Haider and the son of Ghulam Mohammad Khan (died 1833 AD). His mother, Umarun Nisan (sister of Ghulam Askari), was the daughter of Mohammad Salahuddin ibn Karimuddin.

The daughter of Ghulam Askari, Siddiqun Nisan, was the cousin sister of Sardar Bahadur Tafazzul Hussain Khan.

The daughter of Siddiqun Nisan, Fayyazun Nisan, was married to Qazi Mir Imdad Ali. With this relation, Siddiqun Nisan was the maternal grandmother of Hakim Syed Karam Husain.

== Services ==
Tafazzul Hussain Khan became the Risaldar of one of the army units at Nagpur at the time when his father Ghulam Mohammad Khan was 'Kamidan', a commandant in the army. When the news of the revolt against Britishers of Indian mutiny arrived at Nagpur in May 1857, Tafazzul Hussain Khan was the officer of one of the 'Risala'. He opposed the revolt and saved the lives of many British women and children. After the unsuccessful attempt of Indian Rebellion, Britishers begun to gain ground again, promoted their supporters. Tafazzul Hussain Khan was promoted as 'Captain' of a Sowar police and was entitled 'Sardar Bahadur', which was a military decoration awarded for valour. In 1860, he was awarded 'Baswadari' and Jagir of a value of rupees 6 thousands annually at Farrukhnagar and Rewari, District Gurgaon in addition to rupees 1500 as 'Nazrana'. He entered Rewari with his sons on 12 Dhu al-Qi'dah 1276 AH / 1859 AD.

== Children ==
Tafazzul Hussain Khan had five sons: Shahabuddin Haider (died at the age of 19 years at Raipur after the fall from a horse), Ghaziuddin Haider, Ghyasuddin Haider, Mohammad Sirajuddin Haider Khan and Jalaluddin Haider Khan. His one daughter was married to Qasim Husain. Yadgar Husain 'Fitna', the famous Urdu poet was the son of her daughter and Qasim Husain.

== See also ==
- Ghulam Mansoor
