= Hafiz Mazhar Husain =

- Born: 22 November 1857; Bhopal
- Died: 21 March 1912 (aged 54); Bhopal
- Occupation: Chief Justice
- Known for: Sadr Diwani Adalat
- Spouse(s): Sultan Khatoon and Mahmooda Begum (Wife)
- Children: Abul Hasan, Ahmad Hasan, Umatul Habib alias Chutti Bi
- Relatives: Sharifun Nisan Mother; Munshi HakimuddinFather; Amanul HaqGrandfather

Hafiz Mazhar Husain (1857–1912) was the Chief Justice of Bhopal state during the period of Nawab Sultan Jahan Begum.

== Biography ==
Mazhar Husain was born on 22 Safar 1274 AH/November 1857 AD at Bhopal. His father Munshi Hakimuddin was Chief Secretary at Bhopal state.

He learned Quran by heart from Hafiz Rahim Shah. At the same time, he also learned Persian language. He became Tahsildar at the age of 16 years at Badi, Raisen. He returned to Bhopal as Munsif (Sub-judge) where he was later on promoted as Sadr Amin Diwani and then retired as Sadr-us-Sadur (Chief Justice). After retirement, he also served as 'Nasir-ul-Muham', a post with a charge of police and judicial matters.

There were 44 courts (adalat) in Bhopal state, comprising the Chiefs' Court, two Judges' Courts, two Assistant Judges' Courts, two City Magistrates' Courts, One Sadar Amin's Court, one Munsif's Court, six District and Assistant Magistrate's Courts, and 27 Tahsildar's Courts. The 'Sadar-ul-Muham' enjoys the powers of a Sessions Judge, and he hears appeals from the Courts of the nazims and City Magistrates, while the final Court of Appeal is that of the Chief

His name is also mentioned in the book of Nawab Sultan Jahan Begum

== Marriage and children ==
Mazhar Husain first married to Sultan Khatoon, daughter of Raza Hussain with whom he had no children. After her demise on 15 Rajab 1305 AH / 1887 AD, he again married to Mahmooda Begum a.k.a. Masiti daughter of Abdur Razzak. From Mahmooda Begum, he had three children: Abul Hasan, Ahmad Hasan and Umatul Habib alias Chutti Bi.

== Death ==
He died on 21 March 1912 due to Heart attack while he was 'Nasir-ul-Muham'.

== See also ==
- Ghulam Mansoor
