= Syed Zillur Rahman =

Indian scholar of Unani medicine (born 1940)

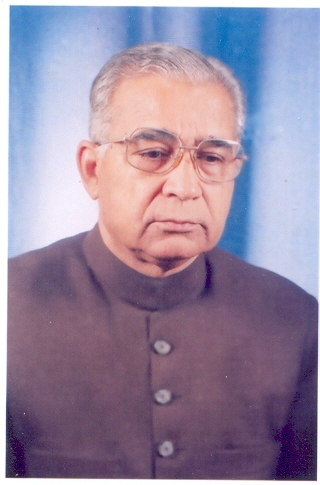
- Born: 1 July 1940 (age 86); Bhopal, Bhopal State, British India (now in Madhya Pradesh, India)
- Citizenship: Indian
- Education: Aligarh Muslim University, Darul-uloom Nadwatul Ulama
- Known for: Unani medicine & History of medicine
- Spouse: Ahmadi Begum (1940–2022)

Hakim Syed Zillur Rahman is an Indian scholar of Unani medicine. He founded Ibn Sina Academy of Medieval Medicine and Sciences in 2000. He had earlier served as Professor and chairman, Department of Ilmul Advia at the Ajmal Khan Tibbiya College, Aligarh Muslim University (AMU), Aligarh, for over 40 years before retiring as Dean Faculty of Unani Medicine. After his retirement, he began serving the AMU as honorary treasurer. In 2006, the Government of India awarded him the Padma Shri for his contribution to Unani medicine.

== Career ==
Rahman started his career in 1961 as a Demonstrator at Ajmal Khan Tibbiya College, Aligarh Muslim University. He then became a Lecturer at Jamia Tibbiya, Delhi, where he became a Reader in 1973 and a Professor in 1983. He remained Chairman of the Department of Ilmul Advia for 18 years and Dean of the Faculty of Unani Medicine, Aligarh Muslim University.

== Bibliography ==
Author of 72 books, some of them are listed below: His books include:

- Daur Jadeed Aur Tibb, 1963. (Book in Urdu on Modern times and Unani medicine)
- Tarikh llm Tashrih, 1967. (Book in Urdu on History of anatomy)
- Ilmul Amraz, 1969. (Based on Avicenna's tract on Pathology in Urdu)
- Resalah Judia, 1971. (Based on Avicenna's tested Prescriptions in Urdu)
- Tajdeed Tibb, 1972. (Book in Urdu on Unani medicine)
- Bayaz Waheedi, 1974. (Book in Urdu on Prescriptions and formulations by Hakim Abdul Waheed)
- Matab Murtaish, 1976. (Book in Urdu on Unani Formularies used by Azizi Family of Lucknow)
- Tazkerah Khandan Azizi, 1978. (Book in Urdu on History of Azizi Family of Unani medicine)
- Kitabul Murakkabat, 1980. (Book in Urdu on Pharmaceutical formulation of Unani medicine)
- Safvi Ahad Main Ilm Tashreeh Ka Mutala, 1983. (Book in Urdu on Studies of History of anatomy during Safavid dynasty)
- Hayat Karam Hussain, 1983. (Biography of Hakim Syed Karam Husain in Urdu)
- The Azizi Family of Physicians, 1983. (Book in English on Azizi Family of Unani medicine)
- Aligarh Key Tibbi Makhtootat, 1984. (Book in Urdu on Manuscripts of Unani medicine extant in Aligarh)
- Qanoon lbn Sina Aur Uskey Shareheen wa Mutarjemeen, 1986. (Based on references and translations of the works of Ibn Sina in Urdu)
- Risalah Nabidh (Edited with Facsimile), 1986. (Book in Urdu and Arabic on Nabidh by Qusta ibn Luqa)
- Tibb Firoz Shahi, 1990. (Book in Urdu on Unani medicine during Firuz Shah Tughlaq)
- Research in Ilmul Advia, 1990. (Book in English on Research in Unani Pharmacology)
- Risalah Atrilal, 1993. (Book in Arabic on Treatise on Ammi majus Linn)
- Studies in Ilmul Advia, 1994. (Book in English on Studies on Unani Pharmacology)
- Dilli aur Tibb Unani, 1995. (Book in Urdu on History of Unani medicine in Delhi)
- AI-Advia al-Qalbia, 1996. (Book in Urdu on Avicenna's treatise on Cardiac drugs)
- Iran Nama, 1998. (Iran Travelogue / Travel journal in Urdu)
- Tibbi Taqdame, 2001. (Based on Prefaces written for many books of other Unani scholars in Urdu)
- Aina-e Tarikh Tibb, 2001. (Based on chapters written on History of Unani medicine in Urdu)
- Asmaul Advia, 2002 (Based on Names of Pharmaceutics in Unani medicine in Urdu)
- Maqalat Shifaul Mulk Hakim Abdul Latif, 2002 (Based on Unani articles written by Shifaul Mulk Hakim Abdul Latif in Urdu)
- Hakim Ajmal Khan, 2004 (Biography of Hakim Ajmal Khan in Urdu and Hindi)
- Persian Translation of Qanun Ibn Sina aur uskey Shirehin wa Mutarjamin, 2004 (Based on references and translations of the works of Ibn Sina in Persian)
- Safar Nama Bangladesh, 2006 (Bangladesh Travelogue / Travel journal in Urdu
- Jawami Kitab Al-Nabd Al-Saghir by Galen, 2007 (Based on Galen's treatise on arterial and venous pulse in Urdu and Arabic)
- Risalah Fi Auja Al Niqris by Qusta Ibn Luqa, 2007 (Based on Al Niqris by Qusta ibn Luqa in Urdu and Arabic)
- Ainul Hayat by Mohammad Ibn Yusuf Harawi, 2007 (Based on Ageing and senile problems by Muhammad ibn Yusuf al-Harawi in Urdu and Arabic)
- Rislah fil Nabidh, 2007 (Based on Arabic translation by Qusta ibn Luqa on Treatise of Nabidh by Rufus of Ephesus in Urdu and Arabic)
- Kitab al Anasir by Galen, 2008 (Based on al Anasir by Galen in Urdu and Arabic)
- Kitab Al Mizaj by Galen, 2008 (Based on Theory of temperament and Four humours by Galen in Urdu and Arabic)
- Kitab fi Firaq al Tibb by Galen, 2008 (Based on a book fi al Firaq by Galen in Urdu and Arabic)
- Tazkira Atibba-e-Asr, 2010 (Biographies of Unani scholars of contemporary age in Urdu)
- Post Graduate Education, Research Methodology and Manuscript Studies in Unani Medicine, 2011 (Edited Book in English on Research methodology in Unani medicine)
- Ross Masud, 2011 (Book on the Biography of Ross Masood in Urdu)
- Mîzân-i Harf, 2012 (Book based on essays and chapters on the life of Syed Amin Ashraf)
- Risala Khizab, 2013 (Book based on Hair coloring)
- Manzoom Tibbi Rasail, 2013
- Shifaul Amraz, 2015
- Dewan-e Ghalib (Based on Ghalib's Poetry collection printed in 1863)
- Mujarrbat-e Karam Hussain, 2015 (Based on prescription of Hakim Syed Karam Husain)
- Ibn Sina Yadgari Khutbat, 2016
- Hakim Ahsanullah Khan, 2017 (Book based on biography; prime minister of Bahadur Shah Zafar)
- English Translation of Qanun Ibn Sina aur uskey Shirehin wa Mutarjamin, 2012 Translator Zakaria Virk, Toronto, Canada
- English translation of Dilli aur Tibbey Unani - History of Greek Medicine in Dehli , 2021 Translator Zakaria Virk, Toronto, Canada
- English translation of Hakim Ajmal Khan - Biography of Hakim Ajmal Khan, 2023 translator Zakaria Virk, Toronto, Canada

== Library ==
- He established a library and archive in the 1960s, which became part of the Shifa-al Mulk Hakim Abdul Latif Memorial Committee in 1970. After the establishment of Ibn Sina Academy of Medieval Medicine and Sciences in 2000, this library (Hakim Zillur Rahman Library) and museum (Hakim Karam Hussain Museum on History of Medicine & Science and Hakim Fazlur Rahman Museum on Arts, Culture & Orientalism) have now become a part of the academy. The library at present houses a collection of 35,000 printed books, 1500 manuscripts,

== Awards and honours ==
Abdur Rahman was appointed honorary visiting professor at Hamdard University in 1997 and have further been awarded the honorary degree of Doctor of Letters at a graduation ceremony in 2013.

- Ayurvedic and Tibbi Academy Award, Government of UP, Lucknow, 1968.
- Urdu Academy Award, Government of UP, Lucknow, 1974.
- Urdu Academy Award, Government of UP, Lucknow, 1978.
- Urdu Academy Award, Government of UP, Lucknow, 1993.
- Certificate of honours for outstanding contribution to Persian Language, (President of India Award on Independence day, 15 August 1995).
- Short-term Consultant, World Health Organization to the South East Asia Region for development of Unani Medicine in Bangladesh, 1996.
- Shifaul Mulk Hakim Habibur Rahman Memorial Foundation Shield, Dhaka, Bangladesh, 1996.
- Visiting Professor, Hamdard University, Karachi, Pakistan, 1997.
- lmtiaz-e Mir Award, All India Mir Academy, Lucknow, 1997.
- Pakistan Tibbi Pharmaceutical Manufacture's Council, Pakistan, 1997.
- Conferment of title: Reflective thinker and Researcher, ldara Sada-e-Qasmi, Karachi, Pakistan, 1997.
- Urdu Academy Award, Government of UP, Lucknow, 1998.
- Hakim Said Memorial Lecture, Hamdard Foundation, Hamdard University, Karachi, 2004
- Institute of Alternative Medicine, Karachi, Pakistan, 2004
- Padma Shri by Government of India, 2006.
- Ibn Sina Award, All India Unani Tibbi Congress, 2009
- Maulana Azad National Award, Milli Educational Foundation & All India Urdu Educational Committee, 2009
- Felicitated by Azam Tibbia College, Hyderabad, Sindh, Pakistan, 2004; Punjab Tibbia College, Jhang, Pakistan, 1997; Ajmal Tibbia College, Rawalpindi, Pakistan, 1997; AR Memorial Tibbia College, Lahore, Pakistan, 1997; Anjuman Himayat Islam Tibbia College, Lahore 1997, 2004 and 2008
- Hakim Ahmed Ashraf Memorial Global Award – Awarded in 2009, by Hakim Ahmed Ashraf Memorial Society (Regd.), Hyderabad.
- D.Litt. (honoris causa) Awarded by Hamdard University, Karachi, Pakistan, 2013.
- Yash Bharti Award, Government of Uttar Pradesh, 2015
- Hakim Ahmed Ashraf Memorial lifetime achievement award,by Hakim Ahmed Ashraf Memorial society (Govt.Regd.)in 2016, Hyderabad Telangana.
- Nawab Siddiq Hasan Khan Award, Madhya Pradesh Urdu Academy, Government of Madhya Pradesh, 2018
- First Sheikh Zayed International Award for TCAM 2020 in the category of Unani Medicine

== See also ==
- Sources of Galen' works
- Writings of Qusta ibn Luqa
- Works on Ibn Sina
- Works on Rufus of Ephesus
- Ain al-Hayat by Muhammad ibn Yusuf al-Harawi
- Hakim Syed Zillur Rahman Library
- Hakim Ajmal Khan
- Hakim Habibur Rahman Foundation
- Dawakhana Shifaul Amraz
- Hakim Abdul Aziz
- List of Indian writers
- Syed Ziaur Rahman, son
- Hakim Syed Karam Husain, grandfather
