= Ibn Sina Academy of Medieval Medicine and Sciences =

Indian trust

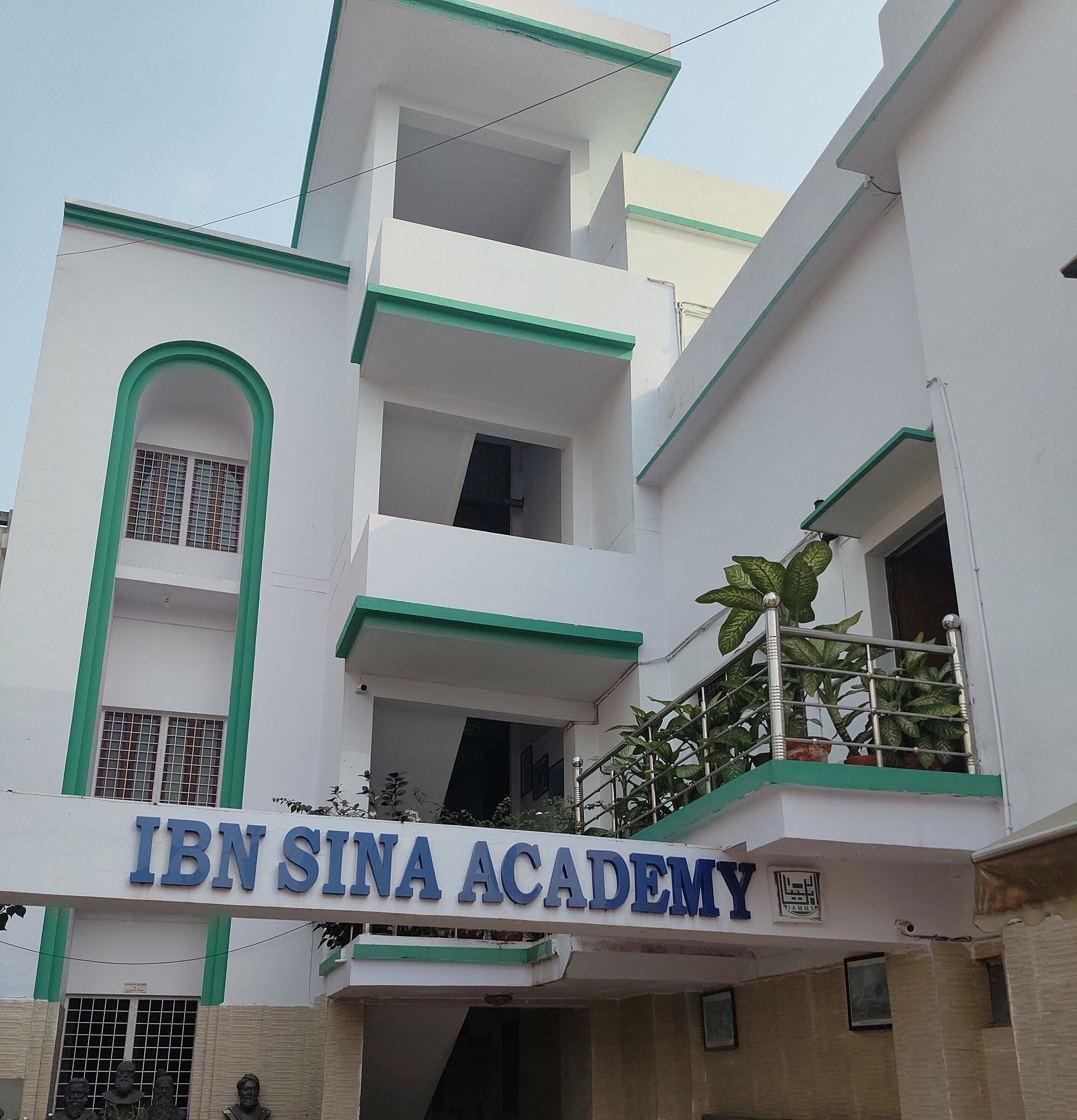
- Formation: 2000
- Founder: Hakim Syed Zillur Rahman
- Type: Non-profit
- Purpose: History of Medical Research
- Headquarters: Tijara House, Aligarh, India
- Region served: India and overseas
- Website: www.ibnsinaacademy.org

Ibn Sina Academy of Medieval Medicine and Sciences (IAMMS) (Urdu: ابن سینا اکاڈمی آف میڈیول میڈیسین اینڈ سائنسیز) is a trust registered under the Indian Trusts Act, 1882. Mohammad Hamid Ansari, former vice-chancellor of Aligarh Muslim University, Aligarh, formally inaugurated it on 21 April 2001. Department of AYUSH, Ministry of Health and Family Welfare, Government of India gave accreditation to the academy in 2004 and promoted it as 'centre of excellence' in 2008. Membership of the academy is open to anyone who has an interest in the academy's activities particularly on history of medicine and history of science. Being a charitable organization, donations to the Academy are also exempted from Income Tax under section 80G of the Income Tax Act 1961.

The founder president is Hakim Syed Zillur Rahman.

Ibn Sina Academy is a part of signatories related to various health issues in the world.

== History ==
Mosaic of Iranian tiles calligraphically inscribed ‘Ibn Sina Academy ...’ (now destroyed during renovation; once installed at the main entrance)

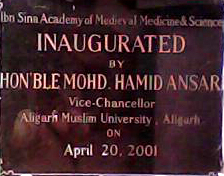
Foundation stone at the entrance gate of academy

Ibn Sina Academy of Medieval Medicine and Sciences is an extension of Majlis Ibn Sina, which was formed in 1965 under the aegis of Tibbi Academy. Majlis Ibn Sina was a sort of monthly discussion group. For instance, the first meeting of that Majlis was held to discuss typhoid.

Tibbi Academy was itself formed in 1963 at Bhopal. In a note on page 4, of the first book of Tibbi Academy, on Modern Times and Unani Medicine the author Hakim Syed Zillur Rahman announced the establishment of Tibbi Academy with its clear objective: "to publicise the theoretical principles and practical ideas of Unani medicine, to publish the text of standard works of Unani medicine and also their translations… further, a learned and research oriented monthly journal".

From 1965 to 1970, a monthly journal with the title Al-Hikmat (in Urdu) from Delhi was published under the auspices of Tibbi Academy under the editorship of Syed Zillur Rahman Nadvi. The editor stated in the introduction of the first issue (May 1965, page 2) that the journal is being issued.

Further, besides the above-mentioned objectives, the editor listed a couple of additional objectives, e.g., "the search of manuscripts of the Unani medicine, their edition and publication, … to excite the feeling of the pressing need of Unani medicine literature, and to publish a standard book every year". He lamented that despite the publication of 30-40 Tibbi magazines in India, no learned journal of Unani medicine is being published. He stressed that Al-Hikmat would be a purely scholarly journal not confined to Unani medicine: It would include some articles on basic sciences, that is, zoology, botany, chemistry, physics, astronomy and philosophy.

In 1970, Hakim Syed Zillur Rahman renamed the Tibbi Academy as Shifaul Mulk Memorial Committee after his teacher, Shifaul Mulk Hakim Abdul Latif (29 April 1900 – 14 November 1970), former professor and principal of Ajmal Khan Tibbiya College, Aligarh Muslim University. The purpose of this memorial committee was the same as Tibbi Academy formed in 1963, except the widened scope of publications.

All these past establishments — Tibbi Academy (1963), Majlis Ibn Sina (1965) and Shifaul Mulk Memorial Committee (1970) — merged and came under one trustee organisation, i.e., Ibn Sina Academy of Medieval Medicine and Sciences in 2000. It was formally inaugurated on 21 April 2001.

== Facilities ==
=== Hakim Zillur Rahman Library ===
The library houses one of the largest collections of 35,000 printed books, 1500 manuscripts, some uncommon books, microfilms, compact discs and a large number of periodicals. Books in many languages like Arabic, Persian, Urdu, Sanskrit and English on subjects like History of Medicine and Sciences, Unani, Medieval medicine, Ilmul Advia (Pharmacology), Urdu Literature with reference to Ghalib, Iqbal, Aligarh and Sir Syed Ahmad Khan, besides thousands of bound volumes of magazines are extant in this library.

The library is listed in the Directory of History of Medicine Collections, United States Department of Health and Human Services, National Library of Medicine, NIH.

=== Karam Hussain Museum on History of Medicine and Sciences ===
Karam Husain Museum on History of Medicine and Sciences is an academic unit with collections and exhibitions. The main theme is the history of health and disease from a cultural perspective, with a focus on the material and iconographic culture of medieval medicine and sciences. The museum has categorically the illustrations and busts of physicians belonging to Mesopotamia, Babylonian, Egyptians, Greeks, Arab and Indian civilizations. In addition, medical manuscripts, catalogues, medical philately, medical souvenirs, memoirs of physicians including Nobel laureates, etc., are preserved and exhibited.

The museum is listed in the 'World's 10 weirdest medical museums', as per CNN Travel.

=== Fazlur Rahman Museum on Orientalism, Art and Culture ===
This museum is located on the 2nd Floor and has 4 main galleries. The Crockery Gallery has a large collection of oriental and British India utensils, plates, bowls, tea-set belonged to many prominent personalities like Hakim Ajmal Khan, Nawab Yusef Ali Khan, Kaikhusrau Jahan, Begum of Bhopal, Sultan Shah Jahan, Begum of Bhopal, etc. The Textile Gallery consists of attires, garments, calico of gold and silver studded stones and many other oriental clothes. The Picture Gallery has pictures, drawings, watercolors, photographic print and paintings especially of people belonged to Aligarh and Aligarh Muslim University. Miscellaneous Gallery has many objects of coins, postage stamps, gemstones, engravings including vintage cameras, clocks, busts, pens, memoirs and relics of some prominent personalities. In the same gallery, there are separate family collections that belong to Prof. Syed Mahmood Husain, Roohi Mabud Hasan, Hakim Syed Fazlur Rahman, etc. In addition, there is a separate "Skins and Taxidermy Collection" displayed on the ground floor.

=== Publication division under Shifaul Mulk Memorial Committee ===
- Periodicals

1. Newsletter of Ibn Sina Academy (NISA), a quarterly newsletter since 2001 (68 issues published). 2. International Journal of Medical Research Professionals (IJMRP). 3. International Archives of BioMedical and Clinical Research (IABCR).

- Books

The academy has published a number of books on the history of medicine and sciences including pharmacology and literature.

Before the existence of Ibn Sina Academy, publications were done under the aegis of Tibbi Academy, formed in 1963. The first book of the Tibbi Academy was Daur Jadeed aur Tibb (Modern Times and Unani Medicine). From 1965 to 1970, a monthly Urdu journal, Al-Hikmat, was published under the auspices of Tibbi Academy. Under the Shifaul Mulk Memorial Committee, many publications came into existence in the area of the history of medicine. The Memorial Committee and Tibbi Academy are now a part of the Publication Division of Ibn Sina Academy.

=== AIDS Cell ===
AIDS Cell of IAMMS was established in the year 2002 with Dr Imran Sabri as the founder In charge of this institute. The Main AIM of the AIDS Cell is to spread awareness about AIDS in common population and newly graduated doctors. AIDS Cell of the academy is dedicated to improving lives, knowledge, and understanding worldwide through diversified research, education, and services in HIV/AIDS screening and prevention, care and treatment, reproductive health and infectious diseases. AIDS Cell is a partner member of Global Health Council (USA) and the AIDS-Care-Watch Campaign (Thailand). It has a separate library of documents relevant to HIV/AIDS project management, research, and reproductive health issues apart from CD-ROMs, poster and books in several languages. AIDS Cell of IAMMS claims responsibility of holding Symposium on Medico-Social implication of the emerging epidemic of HIV/AIDS on India, Free Health check-up and Drug Distribution camp.

=== Ibn Sina Shifa Khana ===
For clinical studies of indigenous drugs, IAMMS is engaged in research and development in its clinical set-up, Ibn Sina Shifakhana, at Okhla Vihar, New Delhi.

=== Centre for Safety and Rational Use of Indian Systems of Medicine ===
The academy took a novel task of improving the use of Indian originated drugs and their adverse reaction monitoring under the establishment of Centre for Safety & Rational Use of Indian Systems of Medicine (CSRUISM) in 2005. CSRUISM receives many adverse drug reactions of herbs, which were never reported earlier. These reactions for their causal relationships are assessed according to Naranjo algorithm and WHO causality categories. The Centre has organised many CMEs on Pharmacovigilance in association with Society of Pharmacovigilance, India

=== Ghalib Study Centre ===
This centre was set up to study Urdu poetry particularly of Mirza Ghalib. The centre has a large collection on 'Ghalibiat' (things related to poet Ghalib). It has several books and periodicals especially ‘Ghalib Numbers’ issued particularly as a part of his birth centenary observed all over the world in 1969. In addition, there are hundreds of other poets’ collection, memoirs and writings. The Centre is famous for organising Mushaira and till now has published two books on Mirza Ghalib.

== Annual events ==
The academy hosts Ibn Sina Memorial Lecture.

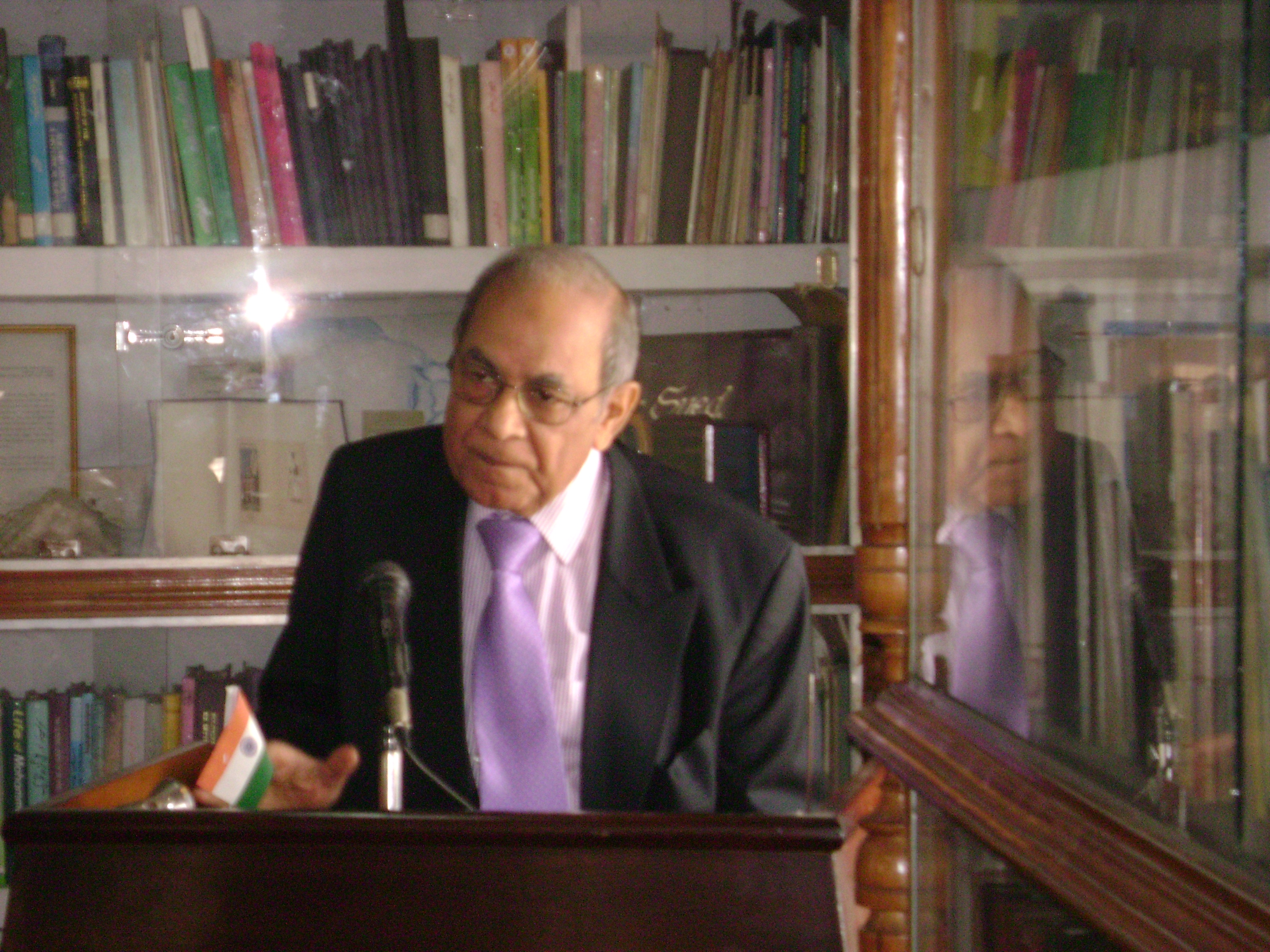
Syed Shahid Mehdi delivering 3rd Ibn Sina Memorial Lecture

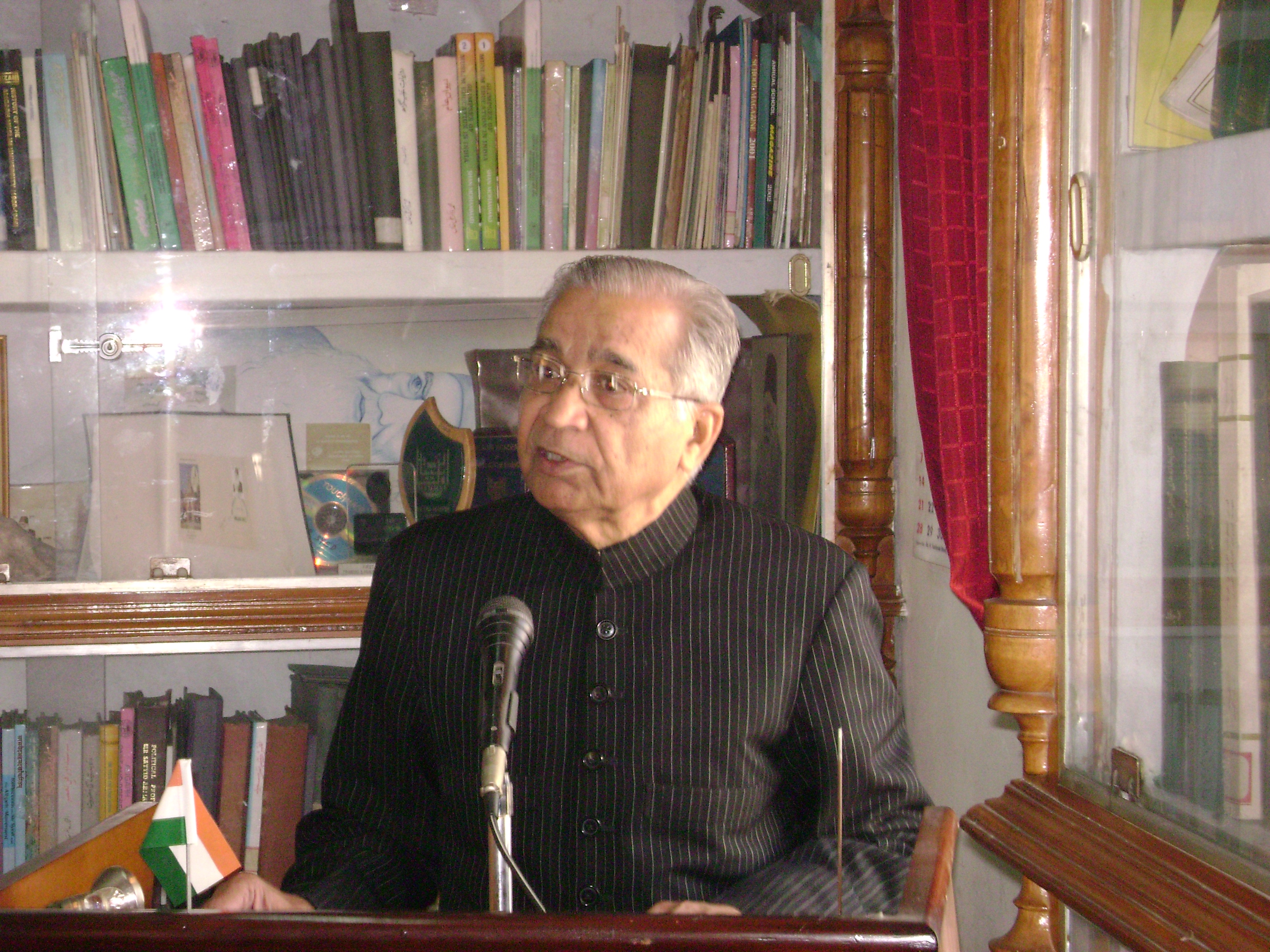
Hakim Syed Zillur Rahman introducing Dr. S. Shahid Mehdi

2nd Prof. M. Nasim Ansari Memorial Lecture Delivered by Dr. M. Habib Raza

== See also ==
- Canon of Medicine
- Galen's influence on Islamic medicine
- Imad al-Din Mahmud ibn Mas'ud Shirazi
- Hakim Syed Karam Husain
- Dawakhana Shifaul Amraz
