= Sultan Jahan, Begum of Bhopal =

Nawab Begum of Bhopal (1858–1930)

Sultan Jahan Begum
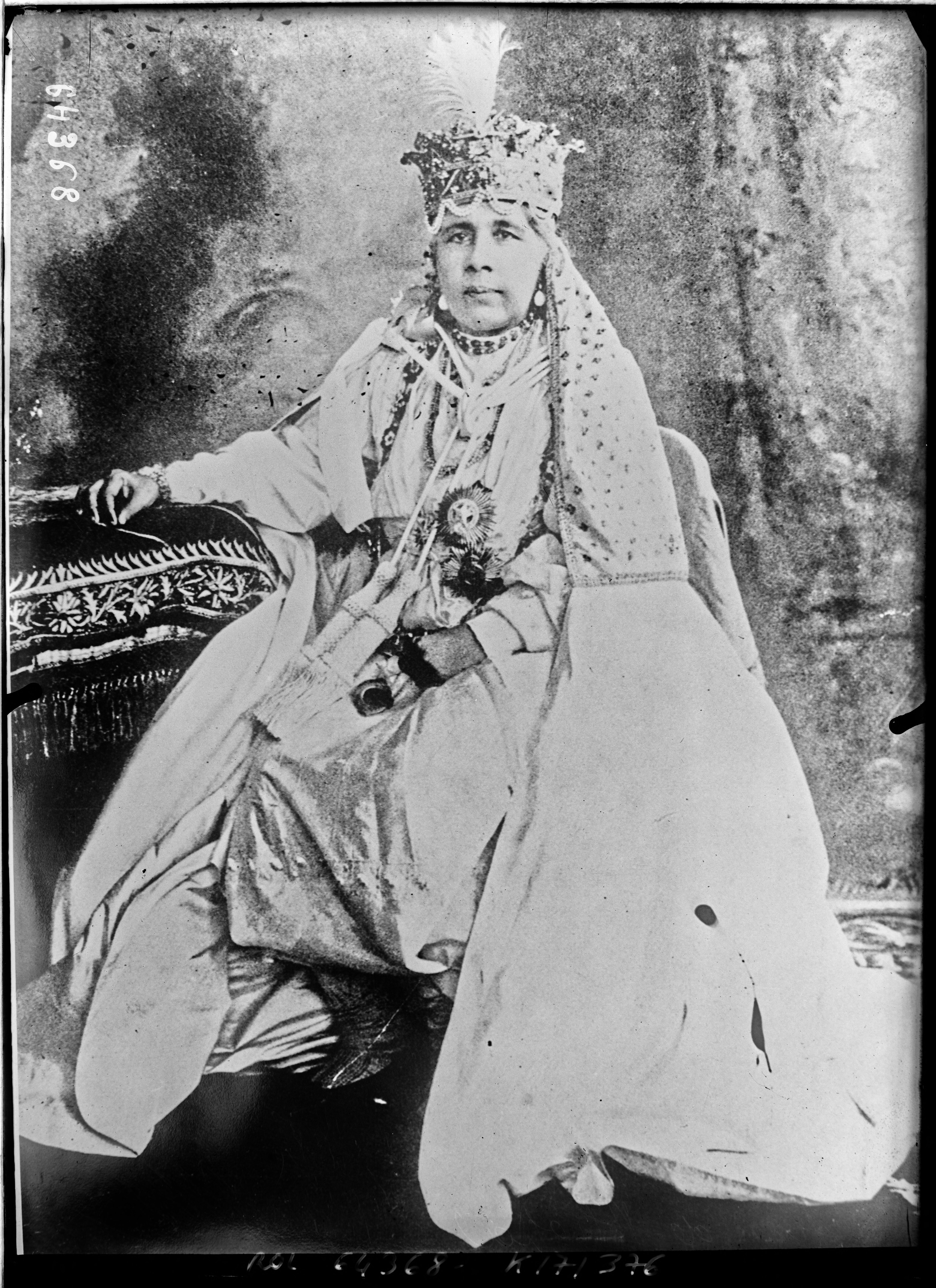
- Sultan Jahan in 1921

Nawab Begum of Bhopal
- Reign: 16 June 1901 – 20 April 1926
- Predecessor: Sultan Shah Jahan Begum
- Successor: Hamidullah Khan
- Born: 9 July 1858; City of Bhopal, Kingdom of Bhopal, Empire of India
- Died: 12 May 1930 (aged 71)
- Spouse: Ahmad Ali Khan Bahadur
- Issue: Princess Bilqis Jahan; Prince Nasru'llah Khan; Prince Ubaidu'llah Khan; Princess Asif Jahan; Hamidullah Khan I of Bhopal
- Father: Baqi Muhammad Khan Bahadur
- Mother: Shah Jahan I of Bhopal
- Military career
- Allegiance: Bhopal State
- Service years: 1901 - 1926

Sultan Jahan I GCSI GCIE CI GBE GCStJ (9 July 1858 – 12 May 1930) was the ruling Begum of Bhopal (the ruler of the Islamic Kingdom of Bhopal in central India) between 1901 and 1926.

== Biography ==
=== Early life ===
Sarkar Amman known better as Sultan Jahan, was born at Bhopal, the elder and only surviving child of Nawab Begum Sultan Shah Jahan and her husband Baqi Muhammad Khan Bahadur (1823–1867). In 1868, she was proclaimed heiress apparent to the Bhopal musnaid following the death of her grandmother, Sikander Begum and her mother's succession to the throne. In 1901, Sultan Jahan succeeded her mother at her death, becoming Nawab Begum of Dar-ul-Iqbal-i-Bhopal.

=== Nawab Begum ===
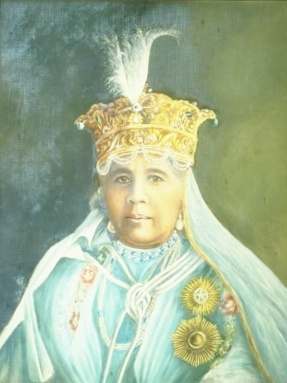
Portrait of Sultan Jahan by Norah Grant, 1911

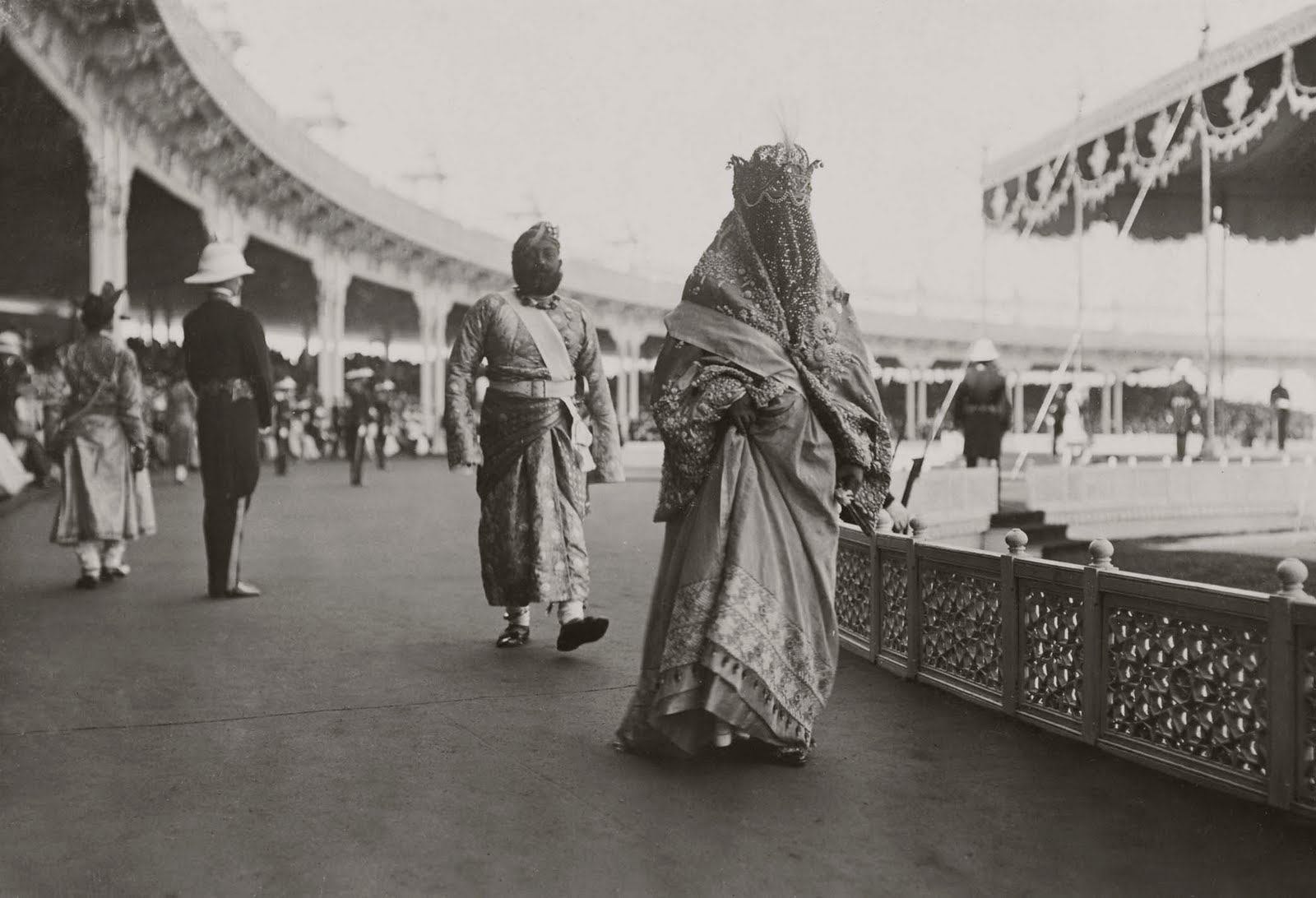
Jahan with her second son at the Delhi Durbar of 1911

A great reformer in the tradition of her mother and grandmother, she was a member of Bharat Stree Mahamandal (The Great Circle of Indian Women) which promoted girls education. Sultan Jahan founded several important educational institutions in Bhopal, establishing free and compulsory primary education in 1918.

During her reign, she had a particular focus on public instruction, especially female education. She built many technical institutes and schools and increased the number of qualified teachers. From 1920 until her death, she was the founding Chancellor of Aligarh Muslim University. As of 2020, she is the only women to have served as Chancellor of Aligarh Muslim University. She was also the first Woman Chancellor of any Indian University and was appointed in 1920 and served in that position until 14 May 1930.

Not just a reformer in the field of education, the Nawab Begum reformed taxation, the army, police, the judiciary and the jails, expanded agriculture, and constructed extensive irrigation and public works in the state. Also, she established an Executive and Legislative State Council in 1922 and began open elections for the municipalities.

In 1914, she was the President of the All-India Muslim Ladies' Association. She was also a patron of the National Council of Women in India. Sultan Jahan's primary legacy, though, was in the field of public health, as she pioneered widespread inoculation and vaccination programs and improved the water supply and standards of hygiene and sanitation. A prolific author, she wrote several books on education, health and other topics, including Hidayat uz-Zaujan, Sabil ul-Jinan, Tandurusti (Health), Bachchon-ki-Parwarish, Hidayat Timardari, Maishat-o-Moashirat. Owing to her numerous activities, she was the recipient of numerous honours and awards.

In 1912, she published the Gauhar-i-Iqbal, which detailed the first seven years of her reign and the socio-political conditions of Bhopal at that time. An English translation, An Account of My Life, was written by C.H. Payne, Sultan Jahan's education advisor. A follow-up book, Akhtar-i-Iqbal, was published in 1922, with the final part published in 1927. In 1918, she wrote the Iffat-ul-Muslimaat, where she compares the notions of purdah and hijab with similar concepts in Europe, Asia, and Egypt.

In 1926, after a reign of 25 years, Sultan Jahan abdicated the throne in favour of her youngest child and only surviving son, Hamidullah Khan. She died four years later, aged 71.

== In popular culture ==
Begamon Ka Bhopal (2017), is a documentary film directed by Rachita Gorowala and produced by the Government of India's Films Division. It explores her life along with the other Begums of Bhopal.

== Family ==
On 1 February 1874, Sultan Jahan married HH Ali Jah, Ihtisham ul-Mulk, Nasir ud-Daula, Nawab Ahmad Ali Khan Bahadur, Sultan Dulha Sahib, Nawab Consort of Bhopal, (1854–1902), 9th cousin, once removed, and a member of the senior male-line branch of the dynasty. The couple had three sons and two daughters:

1. Sahibzadi Bilqis Jahan Muzaffar Begum Sahiba (25 October 1875 – 23 December 1887)
2. Colonel Ali Jah, Nawab Hafiz Sir Muhammad Nasru'llah Khan Sahib Bahadur, Wali Ahad Bahadur, KCSI (3 December 1876 – 3 September 1924). Heir Apparent of Bhopal, granted a personal salute of 9-guns in 1901; commissioned a major in 1912, promoted to colonel in 1918. Named Chief Conservator of Forests in 1924, he was married twice and had two sons and a daughter
3. Major-General Al-Haj Mohsin ul-Mulk, Nawab Hafiz Muhammad Ubaidu'llah Khan Sahib Bahadur, CSI (30 November 1878 – 24 March 1924). Brigadier and C-in-C of the Bhopal State Forces and Imperial Service Troops, 1905; promoted to major-general in 1918. Commissioned a captain in the Indian Army in 1909; promoted to major in 1911 and to lieutenant-colonel in 1921; married and had four sons and a daughter
4. Sahibzadi Asif Jahan Begum Sahiba (5 August 1880 – 22 July 1894)
5. HH Sikander Saulat, Iftikhar ul-Mulk, Al-Haj Nawab Hafiz Muhammad Hamidullah Khan Bahadur (9 September 1894 – 4 February 1960). Successor and Nawab of Dar ul-Iqbal-i-Bhopal

== Titles ==
- 1858–1868: Nawabzadi Sultan Kaikhusrau Jahan Begum Sahiba
- 1868–1877: Nawabzadi Sultan Kaikhusrau Jahan Begum Sahiba, WaliEhad Bahadur
- 1877–1901: Nawabzadi Sultan Kaikhusrau Jahan Begum Sahiba, WaliEhad Bahadur
- 1901–1904: Her Highness Sikander Saulat, Iftikhar ul-Mulk, Nawab Sultan Kaikhusrau Jahan Begum Sahiba, Nawab Begum of Dar ul-Iqbal-i-Bhopal
- 1904–1910: Her Highness Sikander Saulat, Iftikhar ul-Mulk, Nawab Dame Sultan Kaikhusrau Jahan Begum Sahiba, Nawab Begum of Dar ul-Iqbal-i-Bhopal, GCIE
- 1910–1911: Her Highness Sikander Saulat, Iftikhar ul-Mulk, Nawab Dame Sultan Kaikhusrau Jahan Begum Sahiba, Nawab Begum of Dar ul-Iqbal-i-Bhopal, GCSI, GCIE
- 1911–1916: Her Highness Sikander Saulat, Iftikhar ul-Mulk, Nawab Dame Sultan Kaikhusrau Jahan Begum Sahiba, Nawab Begum of Dar ul-Iqbal-i-Bhopal, GCSI, GCIE, CI
- 1916–1917: Her Highness Sikander Saulat, Iftikhar ul-Mulk, Nawab Dame Sultan Kaikhusrau Jahan Begum Sahiba, Nawab Begum of Dar ul-Iqbal-i-Bhopal, GCSI, GCIE, CI, GCStJ
- 1917–1930: Her Highness Sikander Saulat, Iftikhar ul-Mulk, Nawab Dame Sultan Kaikhusrau Jahan Begum Sahiba, Nawab Begum of Dar ul-Iqbal-i-Bhopal, GCSI, GCIE, CI, GBE, GCStJ

== Honours ==
- Empress of India Medal silver – 1877
- Delhi Durbar gold medal – 1903
- Knight Grand Commander of the Order of the Indian Empire (GCIE) – 1904
- Knight Grand Commander of the Order of the Star of India (GCSI) – 1910
- Companion of the Order of the Crown of India (CI) – 1911
- Order of Nobility (Nishan-i-Majidi) of the Ottoman Empire – 1911
- Knight Grand Cross of the Venerable Order of Saint John (GCStJ) – 1916
- Knight Grand Cross of the Order of the British Empire (GBE) – 1917
