= EudraCT =

European clinical trials registry

EudraCT (European Union Drug Regulating Authorities Clinical Trials) is the European clinical trials database of all clinical trials of investigational medicinal products with at least one site in the European Union commencing 1 May 2004 or later. The EudraCT database has been established in accordance with Directive 2001/20/EC. The EudraCT Number is unique and is needed on other documents relating to the trials (e.g. SUSAR reports). No new EudraCT numbers are issued since February 2023. They have been replaced by EU CT numbers.

== Public Side ==
The public side of EudraCT is for organisations to register any of their clinical trials as defined by Directive 2001/20/EC. The process of applying and registering a clinical trial should be completed before submitting an application to any of the Member State/s in which they anticipate running the trial. The public side of EudraCT does not save any of the trial detail entered by the user, and instead provides a saved data file in the form of an XML which the user must store on their own local hard drive.

=== Applying for an EudraCT Number ===
Application for a EudraCT number is made via the EudraCT website. To generate the EudraCT number some basic information about the requestor's organisation and the trial is required:

- Requestor's organisation name, town/city and country.
- Sponsor's protocol number.
- Requestor name.
- E-mail to which the EudraCT number will be sent.
- Security code.
- Whether the clinical trial is contained in a Paediatric Investigation Plan (PIP).
- Whether the clinical trial will be conducted in a third country (outside of the EU/EEA).
- The Member States where it is anticipated that the trial will be run.

Once the requestor submits the form, the EudraCT Number will be assigned and an e-mail called "EudraCT Receipt" sent. The EudraCT number has the format YYYY-NNNNNN-CC, where:

- YYYY is the year in which the number is issued.
- NNNNNN is a six digit sequential number.
- CC is a check digit.

The Clinical Trial Application (CTA) form is also created via the EudraCT system.

== Version details ==
The EudraCT database is currently on Version 9.

=== Current Versions ===
Version 9 of EudraCT was released in November 2013.

New features for Version 9 include:

Protocol-related information

Sponsors can:

- Create, save XML/PDF files of clinical trial applications locally.
- Load locally saved clinical trial applications to complete, validate, compare, or to prepare a package for submission to a National Competent Authority.

PIP addressees can:

- Create, save XML/PDF files of third country files locally.
- Create and post third country files to the EudraCT database.
- Load locally saved third country files to complete, validate or post to the EudraCT database. To post third country files you will need to be registered as a PIP addressee.

Result-related information

- To use result related functionality you will need to be registered as a results user, and log in.

Results users can:

- Create, update, validate and post result data sets, and load summary attachments to the EudraCT database.
- Save locally XML/PDF files of result data sets.
- Upload XML files.

== Member States ==
Country	Organisation	Website
Austria	Bundesamt für Sicherheit im Gesundheitswesen (BASG)	http://www.basg.at/
Belgium	Federaal Agentschap voor Geneesmiddelen en Gezondheidsproducten (AFMPS)	http://www.fagg-afmps.be/
Bulgaria	Bulgarian Drug Agency (BDA)	http://www.bda.bg/
Croatia	Agencija za lijekove i medicinske proizvode	http://www.almp.hr/
Cyprus	Ministry of Health - Pharmaceutical Services	http://www.moh.gov.cy/
Czech Republic	Státní ústav pro kontrolu léčiv (SÚKL)	http://www.sukl.cz/
Denmark	Danish Medicines Agency (DKMA)	http://laegemiddelstyrelsen.dk/
Estonia	State Agency of Medicines (SAM)	http://www.ravimiamet.ee/
Finland	Fimea	http://www.fimea.fi/
France	Agence Nationale de Sécurité du Médicament (ANSM)	http://ansm.sante.fr/
Germany	Bundesinstitut für Arzneimittel und Medizinprodukte (BfArM)	http://www.bfarm.de/
Germany	Paul-Ehrlich-Institut (PEI)	http://www.pei.de/
Greece	National Organisation for Medicines (EOF)	http://www.eof.gr/
Hungary	National Institute of Pharmacy and Nutrition (OGYÉI)	https://www.ogyei.gov.hu/
Iceland	Lyfjastofnun (IMCA)	https://web.archive.org/web/20111003224256/http://www.imca.is/
Ireland	Health Products Regulatory Authority (HPRA)	http://www.hpra.ie/
Italy	Agenzia Italiana del Farmaco (AIFA)	http://www.agenziafarmaco.gov.it/
Latvia	Zalu Valsts Agentura (ZVA)	http://www.zva.gov.lv/
Liechtenstein	Amt für Gesundheit (AG)	https://web.archive.org/web/20111024152641/http://www.ag.llv.li/
Lithuania	Valstybine Vaistu Kontroles Tarnyba (VVKT)	http://www.vvkt.lt/
Luxembourg	Division de la Pharmacie et des Medicaments	http://www.etat.lu/MS
Malta	Medicines Authority	http://medicinesauthority.gov.mt/
Netherlands	Centrale Commissie Mensgebonden Onderzoek (CCMO)	http://www.ccmo.nl/
Norway	Statens Legemiddelverk (NOMA)	http://www.noma.no/
Poland	Urząd Rejestracji Produktów Leczniczych (URPL)	http://www.urpl.gov.pl/
Portugal	Autoridade National do Medicamento e Produtos de Saude I.P. (Infarmed)	http://www.infarmed.pt/
Romania	Agentia Nationala a Medicamentului si Dispozitivelor Medicale (ANMDM)	https://www.anm.ro/
Slovakia	Slovakia Medicines Agency	http://www.sukl.sk/
Slovenia	Javna Agencija Republike Slovenije za Zdravila in Medicinske Prioimocke (JAZMP)	http://www.jazmp.si/
Spain	Agencia Española de Medicamentos y Productos Sanitarios (AEMPS)	http://www.aemps.gob.es/
Sweden	Lakemedelsverket	http://www.lakemedelsverket.se/
UK	Medicines and Healthcare Products Regulatory Agency (MHRA)	http://www.mhra.gov.uk/

== See also ==
- European Medicines Agency
- EUDRANET
- EudraGMP
- EudraPharm
- EudraVigilance
