= European Forum for Good Clinical Practice =

The European Forum for Good Clinical Practices (EFGCP) is a European think tank which works on the ethical, regulatory, and scientific framework of clinical research in Europe. The EFGCP is committed to the development of the standards for the protection of human subjects and data quality in clinical trials, both in Europe and abroad.

== See also ==
- European Medicines Agency (EMEA, EU)
- European and Developing Countries Clinical Trials Partnership (EDCTP)
- EUDRANET
- EudraVigilance
- Good Clinical Practice (GCP)
- Harmonization in clinical trials
- International Conference on Harmonisation of Technical Requirements for Registration of Pharmaceuticals for Human Use (ICH)
- Inverse benefit law
- Quality assurance
- Standing operating procedure
