= Krishan Chandra Singhal =

Indian pharmacologist (1941–2025)

- Born: 16 June 1941; Aligarh, United Provinces, British India (now Uttar Pradesh, India)
- Died: 20 April 2025 (aged 83)
- Citizenship: India
- Education: Aligarh Muslim University, King George Medical College, Sardar Patel Medical College, Bikaner
- Known for: Pharmacology & Pharmacovigilance
- Spouse: Usha Singhal

Krishan Chandra Singhal (16 June 1941 – 20 April 2025) was an Indian pharmacologist who served as the founder vice chancellor of NIMS University in Jaipur, India.

== Early life and education ==
Singhal was born at Aligarh on 16 June 1941. He completed high school and then earned his BSc from Aligarh Muslim University. He once secured second position in a competition organised under "Physical Culture Test' in 1957–58 session. He did MBBS (1959 batch) and MD (1968) from King George Medical College, Lucknow; PhD (1976) from Sardar Patel Medical College, Bikaner and DSc (2001) from Aligarh Muslim University, Aligarh.

== Career ==
Singhal joined Department of Pharmacology, Jawaharlal Nehru Medical College of Aligarh Muslim University as Assistant Research Officer under a project of Indian Council of Medical Research on 29 January 1968. He then worked as Demonstrator (15 May 1968), appointed Lecturer (1969), Reader (30 March 1979) and Professor (3 May 1988). He became the 'Chairman', Department of Pharmacology, Jawaharlal Nehru Medical College from 8 August 1990 to 7 August 1996 and then from 8 August 1999 to 7 August 2002.

== Scientific contributions ==
Singhal made extensive and highly significant contributions in the field of pharmacology. He established new methods for screening antifilarial agents using Setaria cervi as test organism. He was one of the foremost pioneers in the field of Indian Pharmacovigilance and organised many scientific meets in the field of Pharmacovigilance. He founded the Society of Pharmacovigilance, India (SoPI) in 1999.

== Personal life and death ==
Singhal belonged to a family of learned physicians and scholars. This family is very well known in Aligarh as a "Doctor Family". His father Dr. Ganga Prasad Gupta was a leading practitioner in Aligarh. The lifelong companion, Professor Usha Singhal is a noted name in the field of Physiology. All his children and their spouses (sons-in-law and daughter-in-law) are also physicians and doctors. Apart from them, Dr. Singhal's brother and sister-in-law are also celebrated practitioners in Aligarh.

Singhal died on 20 April 2025, at the age of 83.

== Bibliography ==
- Manual for Practical exercises in Pharmacy
- Manual for Practical exercises in Experimental Pharmacology
- Textbook of Pharmacology, JP Brothers, Delhi, India

== Awards and 'Orations' delivered ==
- BC Sharma Memorial Research Award of Indian Medical Association (1975)
- SS Parmar Foundation Award of Indian Academy of Neuroscience (1984)
- Major General SL Bhatia Oration Award of Association of Physiologists and Pharmacologists of India (1995)
- Colonel RN Chopra Oration Award of Indian Pharmacological Society (1995)
- Platinum Jubilee Oration Award of Indian Science Congress Association (1996)
- G Achari Oration Award of Indian Pharmacological Society (2001)
- John Autian Oration Award of Society of Pharmacovigilance, India (2002)
- Distinguished Visiting Professor, University of Tennessee, (2005)

== See also ==
- NIMS University, Jaipur
- PN Saxena, teacher
- Syed Ziaur Rahman, student
