= International Union of Basic and Clinical Pharmacology =

Non-profit organization concerned with pharmacology and medicinal development

- Abbreviation: IUPHAR
- Formation: 1959; 67 years ago
- Type: INGO
- Region served: Worldwide
- Official language: English
- Parent organization: International Council for Science
- Website: iuphar.org

The International Union of Basic and Clinical Pharmacology (IUPHAR) is a voluntary, non-profit association representing the interests of scientists in pharmacology-related fields to facilitate Better Medicines through Global Education and Research around the world.

== History ==
Established in 1959 as a section of the International Union of Physiological Sciences, IUPHAR became an independent organization in 1966 and is a member of the International Council for Science (ICSU). The first World Congress of Pharmacology was held in Stockholm, Sweden in 1961 and subsequently held every three years. After 1990 the World Congresses were moved to a four-year interval. These meetings present the latest pharmacological research, technology, and methodology, and provide a forum for international collaboration and exchange of ideas. A General Assembly, consisting of delegates from all the member societies, is convened during the congresses so member societies have an opportunity to elect the Executive Committee and vote on matters concerning the governance and activities of the union.

== Members ==
IUPHAR members are regional, national and special-interest societies around the world. The various sections and committees are composed of individuals from academia, pharmaceutical companies, and government organizations. IUPHAR resources are available to all members of the pharmacology-related societies that adhere to IUPHAR.

== Composition ==
IUPHAR is divided in sectional topics. The Division of Clinical Pharmacology, including 3 subcommittees of Developing Countries, Geriatrics, and Pharmacoepidemiology and Pharmacovigilance, focuses on the needs and research tools for clinicians. The Committee on Receptor Nomenclature and Drug Classification (NC-IUPHAR) provides a uniform guideline for naming and classifying results from the Human Genome Project, naming proteins derived from new sequences as functional receptors and ion channels. Sections specializing in various areas of pharmacology have been established, including Drug Metabolism and Drug Transport, Education, Gastrointestinal Pharmacology, Immunopharmacology, Pharmacology of Natural products, Neuropsychopharmacology, Pediatrics Clinical Pharmacology and Pharmacogenetics and Pharmacogenomics. Volunteers participate in the various sections and division according to their interests and training.

== Activities ==
A primary purpose of IUPHAR is providing global free access to a major, on-line repository of characterization data for receptors, ion channels, enzyme target classes and drugs through the Committee on Receptor Nomenclature and Drug Classification (NC-IUPHAR), established in 1987. The Guide to Pharmacology established in 2012 superseded the earlier IUPHAR-DB and the Guide to Receptors and Channels (published in the British Journal of Pharmacology). This is a joint endeavor with the British Pharmacological Society, and has been supported by the Wellcome Trust. It includes all the G protein-coupled receptors, voltage-gated ion channels, 7TM receptors, nuclear receptors, ligand-gated ion channels and Kinases which are known to be in the human genome. Where relevant, data on the rat and mouse homologues are presented to assist researchers and clinicians in developing and/or enhancing therapeutics for eventual medication in humans.

NC-IUPHAR also promulgates standards of name nomenclature for research in pharmacology and the related disciplines.

In general, IUPHAR offers individual pharmacologists free curriculum expertise, career development and job listings (the non-profit PharmacoCareers.org), research resources, and collaboration opportunities. IUPHAR offers its member societies venues for participating in worldwide initiatives, publicizing member meetings and activities, nominating individuals for Young Investigator awards, and naming delegates to the quadrennial General Assemblies. A biannual newsletter entitled Pharmacology International is published.

As a non-government organization in official relations with the World Health Organization (WHO), IUPHAR representatives help shape international policy on essential medicines, appropriate dose therapeutics for children, and clinical pharmacology core competencies among its many WHO-related activities.

The Division of Clinical Pharmacology compiled and released the Research in Humans Compendium, a free resource to provide the scientific community interested in human research with information on the design of research protocols to assess the effectiveness of a drug in a series of pathological conditions.

IUPHAR is involved in the development of pharmacology in developing countries. In conjunction with ICSU the Pharmacology for Africa (PharfA) initiative was undertaken in 2006 to promote and organize pharmacology on the African continent. The South African Society of Basic and Clinical Pharmacology is building a database and network of institutions and pharmacologists to create an infrastructure for training and funding pharmacologists. The long-term goal is for the African continent to attain the necessary pharmacological knowledge and resources to address disease-related issues affecting the population. As part of this mission, with the support of ICSU and the American Society for Pharmacology and Experimental Therapeutics, the IUPHAR Education Section organized a series of workshops, mostly in Africa, to train young investigators on ethical laboratory practices, including the three Rs of ethical use of animals.

IUPHAR Pharmacology Education Project is a website developed by IUPHAR, with support from the American Society for Pharmacology and Experimental Therapeutics (ASPET), as a learning resource to support education and training in the pharmacological sciences. The materials are intended for use by students of pharmacology, clinical pharmacologists, and others interested in the pharmacological sciences. The stated aim is to produce a simple, attractive, easily searchable resource that will support students and teachers of the biomedical sciences, medicine, nursing and pharmacy. It is also intended as an introduction to some of the new data in the IUPHAR/BPS Guide to PHARMACOLOGY, particularly for those less familiar with such material.

== Future directions ==
The early years of the 21st century will be focused on integrating basic and clinical research to implement translational medicine techniques more quickly. The 9th World Conference on Clinical Pharmacology and Therapeutics in Québec City, Canada was the last IUPHAR meeting to present clinical pharmacology separately. The World Congress of Basic and Clinical Pharmacology in Copenhagen, Denmark on July 17–23, 2010 was the first integrated meeting. The merging of these different approaches to the same discipline is to accelerate the introduction of improved therapeutics for humans.

Educational components will be emphasized for both existing pharmacology programs as well as increasing and enhancing pharmacology training in developing countries. This topic was a central theme of the 17th World Congress of Basic and Clinical Pharmacology (WCP2014) held July 13–18, 2014 in Cape Town, South Africa. The 18th World Congress of Basic and Clinical Pharmacology (WCP2018) being held in Kyoto, Japan on July 1–6, 2018 will focus on drug development and therapeutics using new methodologies such as genome sequencing, stem cell biology, nanotechnology and systems biology.

== See also ==
- Drug design
- Medicinal chemistry
- Pre-clinical development
- Federation of European Pharmacological Societies
- European Association for Clinical Pharmacology and Therapeutics
- Safety Pharmacology Society
