= Safety pharmacology =

Safety pharmacology is a branch of pharmacology specialising in detecting and investigating potential undesirable pharmacodynamic effects of new chemical entities (NCEs) on physiological functions in relation to exposure in the therapeutic range and above.

Primary organ systems (so-called core battery systems) are:

- Central Nervous System
- Cardiovascular System
- Respiratory System

Secondary organ systems of interest are:

- Gastrointestinal System
- Renal System

Safety pharmacology studies are required to be completed prior to human exposure (i.e., Phase I clinical trials), and regulatory guidance is provided in ICH S7A and other documents.

== Key aims of safety pharmacology ==
The aims of nonclinical safety pharmacology evaluations are three-fold:

- To protect Phase I clinical trial volunteers from acute adverse effects of drugs
- To protect patients (including patients participating in Phase II and III clinical trials)
- To minimize risks of failure during drug development and post-marketing phases due to undesirable pharmacodynamic effects

== Key issues ==
The following key issues have to be considered within safety pharmacology:

- The detection of adverse effects liability (i.e. hazard identification)
- Investigation of the mechanism of effect (risk assessment)
- Calculating a projected safety margin
- Implications for clinical safety monitoring
- Mitigation strategies

== Background ==
The first appearance of the term ‘safety pharmacology’ in the published literature dates back to 1980. The term was certainly in common usage in the 1980s within the pharmaceutical industry to describe nonclinical pharmacological evaluation of unintended effects of candidate drugs for regulatory submissions. Back then, it was part of a wider ‘general pharmacology’ assessment, which addressed actions of a drug candidate beyond the therapeutically intended effects. The only detailed guidelines indicating the requirements from drug regulatory authorities for general pharmacology studies were from the Ministry of Health, Labour, and Welfare. Nowadays, the term ‘general pharmacology’ is no longer used, and the ICH S7A guidelines distinguish between primary pharmacodynamics (“studies on the mode of action and/or effects of a substance in relation to its desired therapeutic target”), secondary pharmacodynamics (“studies on the mode of action and/or effects of a substance not related to its desired therapeutic target”) and safety pharmacology (“studies that investigate the potential undesirable pharmacodynamic effects of a substance on physiological functions in relation to exposure in the therapeutic range and above.”). A major stimulus to the discipline of safety pharmacology was the release in 1996 of a draft ‘Points to Consider’ document on QT prolongation by the European Medicines Agency's Committee for Proprietary Medicinal Products (CPMP), issued in final form the following year. This initiative had been prompted by growing concern of sudden death caused by drug-induced torsade de pointes, a potentially lethal cardiac tachyarrhythmia. Later, in 2005, this concern was addressed by issue of the ICH S7B guidelines.

== Preclinical safety pharmacology ==
Preclinical safety pharmacology integrates in silico, in vitro, and in vivo approaches. In vitro safety pharmacology studies are focused on early hazard identification and subsequent compound profiling in order to guide preclinical in vivo safety and toxicity studies. Early compound profiling can flag for receptor-, enzyme-, transporter-, and ion channel-related liabilities of NCEs (e.g., inhibition of the human ether-a-go-go related gene protein (hERG)). Classically, in vivo investigations comprise the use of young adult conscious animals.

== Study design ==
Safety pharmacology studies have to be designed for defining the dose-response relationship of the adverse effect observed. Justification should be provided for the selection of the particular animal model or test system. The time course (e.g., onset and duration of response) of the adverse effect is investigated through selected time points for the measurements based on pharmacodynamic and pharmacokinetic considerations. Generally, the doses eliciting the adverse effect have to be compared to the doses eliciting the primary pharmacodynamic effect in the test species or the proposed therapeutic effect in humans.

== Regulatory guidance documents (current versions) ==
The primary reference document for safety pharmacology is ICH S7A, followed by many key regulatory documents which either focus on or mention safety pharmacology:

- ICH S7A: Safety pharmacology studies for human pharmaceuticals. .
- ICH S7B: Nonclinical evaluation of the potential for delayed ventricular repolarization (QT interval prolongation) by human pharmaceuticals. .
- ICH S6(R1): Preclinical safety evaluation of biotechnology-derived pharmaceuticals. .
- ICH S9: Nonclinical evaluation for anticancer pharmaceuticals. .
- ICH M3(R2): Guidance on nonclinical safety studies for the conduct of human clinical trials and marketing authorisation for pharmaceuticals. .
- ICH E14: Clinical evaluation of QT/QTc interval and proarrhythmic potential for non-antiarrhythmic drugs. .
- EMEA/CHMP/SWP/94227/2004. Adopted by CHMP. Guideline on the Non-Clinical Investigation of the Dependence Potential of Medicinal Products. .
- FDA U.S. Department of Health and Human Services Food and Drug Administration - Center for Drug Evaluation and Research (CDER). Guidance for Industry. Assessment of abuse potential of drugs. Final Guidance. .
- FDA U.S. Department of Health and Human Services Food and Drug Administration - Center for Drug Evaluation and Research (CDER). Guidance for Industry. Exploratory IND studies. .

== See also ==
- SPS: There is a global scientific society fostering best practice within the discipline of safety pharmacology. This Safety Pharmacology Society (SPS) promotes knowledge, development, application, and training in safety pharmacology.
- CiPA: Comprehensive in vitro Proarrhythmia Assay (2013): In the coming years, the FDA plans to update the current regulatory documents for preclinical and clinical safety evaluation of proarrhythmic risk in human (i.e. ICH-S7B and ICH-E14). The Comprehensive in vitro Proarrhythmia Assay (CiPA) is a novel safety pharmacology paradigm intending to provide a more accurate assessment of cardiac safety testing for potential proarrhythmic events in human. This initiative is driven by a steering team including partners from US FDA, HESI, CSRC, SPS, EMA, Health Canada, Japan NIHS, and PMDA. The CiPA includes in vitro assays coupled to in silico reconstructions of cellular cardiac electrophysiological activity with verification of relevance through comparison of drug effects in human stem cell-derived cardiomyocytes. If these evaluation efforts succeed, CiPA will become a Safety Pharmacology screening tool for drug research and development purposes. The CiPA Steering Committee and the ICH-S7B and ICH-E14 Working Groups will position the CiPA paradigm within the upcoming revisions of the a forementioned regulatory documents.
