= Self-medication =

Unsupervised use of drugs and other substances

Self-medication, sometimes called do-it-yourself (DIY) medicine, is a human behavior in which an individual uses a substance or any exogenous influence to self-administer treatment for physical or psychological conditions, for example headaches or fatigue.

The substances most widely used in self-medication are over-the-counter drugs and dietary supplements, which are used to treat common health issues at home. These do not require a doctor's prescription to obtain and, in some countries, are available in supermarkets and convenience stores.

The field of psychology surrounding the use of psychoactive drugs is often specifically in relation to the use of recreational drugs, alcohol, comfort food, and other forms of behavior to alleviate symptoms of mental distress, stress and anxiety, including mental illnesses or psychological trauma. Such treatment may cause serious detriment to physical and mental health if motivated by addictive mechanisms. In postsecondary (university and college) students, self-medication with "study drugs" such as Adderall, Ritalin, and Concerta has been widely reported and discussed in literature.

Products are marketed by manufacturers as useful for self-medication, sometimes on the basis of questionable evidence. Claims that nicotine has medicinal value have been used to market cigarettes as self-administered medicines. These claims have been criticized as inaccurate by independent researchers. Unverified and unregulated third-party health claims are used to market dietary supplements.

Self-medication is often seen as gaining personal independence from established medicine, and it can be seen as a human right, implicit in, or closely related to the right to refuse professional medical treatment. Self-medication can cause unintentional self-harm. Self-medication with antibiotics has been identified as one of the primary reasons for the evolution of antimicrobial resistance.

Sometimes self-medication or DIY medicine occurs because patients disagree with a doctor's interpretation of their condition, to access experimental therapies that are not available to the public, or because of legal bans on healthcare, as in the case of some transgender people or women seeking self-induced abortion. Other reasons for relying on DIY medical care is to avoid health care prices in the United States and anarchist beliefs.

== Definition ==
Generally speaking, self-medication is defined as "the use of drugs to treat self-diagnosed disorders or symptoms, or the intermittent or continued use of a prescribed drug for chronic or recurrent disease or symptoms".

Self-medication can be defined as the use of drugs to treat an illness or symptom when the user is not a medically qualified professional. The term is also used to include the use of drugs outside their license or off-label.

== Psychology and psychiatry ==
=== Self-medication hypothesis ===
As different drugs have different effects, they may be used for different reasons. According to the self-medication hypothesis (SMH), the individuals' choice of a particular drug is not accidental or coincidental, but instead, a result of the individuals' psychological condition, as the drug of choice provides relief to the user specific to his or her condition. Specifically, addiction is hypothesized to function as a compensatory means to modulate effects and treat distressful psychological states, whereby individuals choose the drug that will most appropriately manage their specific type of psychiatric distress and help them achieve emotional stability.

The self-medication hypothesis (SMH) originated in papers by Edward Khantzian, Mack and Schatzberg, David F. Duncan, and a response to Khantzian by Duncan. The SMH initially focused on heroin use, but a follow-up paper added cocaine. The SMH was later expanded to include alcohol, and finally all drugs of addiction.

According to Khantzian's view of addiction, drug users compensate for deficient ego function by using a drug as an "ego solvent", which acts on parts of the self that are cut off from consciousness by defense mechanisms. According to Khantzian, drug dependent individuals generally experience more psychiatric distress than non-drug dependent individuals, and the development of drug dependence involves the gradual incorporation of the drug effects and the need to sustain these effects into the defensive structure-building activity of the ego itself. The addict's choice of drug is a result of the interaction between the psychopharmacologic properties of the drug and the affective states from which the addict was seeking relief. The drug's effects substitute for defective or non-existent ego mechanisms of defense. The addict's drug of choice, therefore, is not random.

While Khantzian takes a psychodynamic approach to self-medication, Duncan's model focuses on behavioral factors. Duncan described the nature of positive reinforcement (e.g., the "high feeling", approval from peers), negative reinforcement (e.g. reduction of negative affect) and avoidance of withdrawal symptoms, all of which are seen in those who develop problematic drug use, but are not all found in all recreational drug users. While earlier behavioral formulations of drug dependence using operant conditioning maintained that positive and negative reinforcement were necessary for drug dependence, Duncan maintained that drug dependence was not maintained by positive reinforcement, but rather by negative reinforcement. Duncan applied a public health model to drug dependence, where the agent (the drug of choice) infects the host (the drug user) through a vector (e.g., peers), while the environment supports the disease process, through stressors and lack of support.

Khantzian revisited the SMH, suggesting there is more evidence that psychiatric symptoms, rather than personality styles, lie at the heart of drug use disorders. Khantzian specified that the two crucial aspects of the SMH were that (1) drugs of abuse produce a relief from psychological suffering and (2) the individual's preference for a particular drug is based on its psychopharmacological properties. The individual's drug of choice is determined through experimentation, whereby the interaction of the main effects of the drug, the individual's inner psychological turmoil, and underlying personality traits identify the drug that produces the desired effects.

Meanwhile, Duncan's work focuses on the difference between recreational and problematic drug use. Data obtained in the Epidemiologic Catchment Area Study demonstrated that only 20% of drug users ever experience an episode of drug abuse (Anthony & Helzer, 1991), while data obtained from the National Comorbidity Study demonstrated that only 15% of alcohol users and 15% of illicit drug users ever become dependent. A crucial determinant of whether a drug user develops drug abuse is the presence or absence of negative reinforcement, which is experienced by problematic users, but not by recreational users. According to Duncan, drug dependence is an avoidance behavior, where an individual finds a drug that produces a temporary escape from a problem, and taking the drug is reinforced as an operant behavior.

=== Specific mechanisms ===
Some people who have a mental illness attempt to correct their illnesses by using certain drugs. Depression is often self-medicated by the use of alcohol, tobacco, cannabis, or other mind-altering drugs. While this may provide immediate relief of some symptoms such as anxiety, it may evoke and/or exacerbate some symptoms of several kinds of mental illnesses that are already latently present, and may lead to addiction or physical dependency, among other side effects of long-term use of the drug. This does not differ significantly from the potential effects of drugs provided by physicians, which are equally capable of producing dependency and/or addiction and also have side effects arising from long-term use.

People with post-traumatic stress disorder have been known to self-medicate, as well as many individuals without this diagnosis who have experienced psychological trauma.

Due to the different effects of the different classes of drugs, the SMH postulates that the appeal of a specific class of drugs differs from person to person. In fact, some drugs may be aversive for individuals for whom the effects could worsen affective deficits.

==== CNS depressants ====
Alcohol and sedative/hypnotic drugs, such as barbiturates and benzodiazepines, are central nervous system (CNS) depressants that lower inhibitions via anxiolysis. Depressants produce feelings of relaxation and sedation, while relieving feelings of depression and anxiety. Though they are generally ineffective antidepressants, as most are short-acting, the rapid onset of alcohol and sedative/hypnotics softens rigid defenses and, in low to moderate doses, provides relief from depressive affect and anxiety. As alcohol also lowers inhibitions, alcohol is also hypothesized to be used by those who normally constrain emotions by attenuating intense emotions in high or obliterating doses, which allows them to express feelings of affection, aggression and closeness. Most patients that have been hospitalized for substance use or alcohol dependence reported using drugs in response to depressive symptoms; self-medication makes diagnosing a psychiatric disorder very difficult in substance abusers. This type of misuse is more likely in men than in women.

===== Alcohol =====
People with social anxiety disorder commonly use alcohol to overcome their highly set inhibitions.

==== Psychostimulants ====
Psychostimulants, such as cocaine, amphetamines, methylphenidate, caffeine, and nicotine, produce improvements in physical and mental functioning, including increased energy and alertness. Stimulants tend to be most widely used by people with attention deficit hyperactivity disorder (ADHD), which can either be diagnosed or undiagnosed. Because a significant portion of people with ADHD have not been diagnosed they are more prone to using stimulants like caffeine, nicotine or pseudoephedrine to mitigate their symptoms. Unawareness concerning the effects of illicit substances such as cocaine, methamphetamine or mephedrone can result in self-medication with these drugs by individuals affected with ADHD symptoms. This self medication can effectively prevent them from getting diagnosed with ADHD and receiving treatment with stimulants like methylphenidate and amphetamines.

Stimulants also can be beneficial for individuals who experience depression, to reduce anhedonia and increase self-esteem, however in some cases depression may occur as a comorbid condition originating from the prolonged presence of negative symptoms of undiagnosed ADHD, which can impair executive functions, resulting in lack of motivation, focus and contentment with one's life, so stimulants may be useful for treating treatment-resistant depression, especially in individuals thought to have ADHD. The SMH also hypothesizes that hyperactive and hypomanic individuals use stimulants to maintain their restlessness and heighten euphoria. Additionally, stimulants are useful to individuals with social anxiety by helping individuals break through their inhibitions. Some reviews suggest that students use psychostimulants to self medicate for underlying conditions, such as ADHD, depression or anxiety.

==== Opiates ====
Opiates, such as heroin and morphine, function as an analgesic by binding to opioid receptors in the brain and gastrointestinal tract. This binding reduces the perception of and reaction to pain, while also increasing pain tolerance. Opiates are hypothesized to be used as self-medication for aggression and rage. Opiates are effective anxiolytics, mood stabilizers, and anti-depressants, however, people tend to self-medicate anxiety and depression with depressants and stimulants respectively, though this is by no means an absolute analysis.

Modern research into novel antidepressants targeting opioid receptors suggests that endogenous opioid dysregulation may play a role in medical conditions including anxiety disorders, clinical depression, and borderline personality disorder. BPD is typically characterized by sensitivity to rejection, isolation, and perceived failure, all of which are forms of psychological pain. As research suggests that psychological pain and physiological pain both share the same underlying mechanism, it is likely that under the self-medication hypothesis some or most recreational opioid users are attempting to alleviate psychological pain with opioids in the same way opioids are used to treat physiological pain.

==== Cannabis ====
Cannabis is paradoxical in that it may produce either stimulating, sedating, or a timely combination of both effects; as well as mildly psychedelic and both anxiolytic or anxiogenic properties being possible, depending on the individual and circumstances of use. Depressant properties are more obvious in occasional users, and stimulating properties are more common in chronic users. Khantzian noted that research had not sufficiently addressed a theoretical mechanism for cannabis, and therefore did not include it in the SMH.

=== Effectiveness ===
Self-medicating excessively for prolonged periods of time with benzodiazepines or alcohol often makes the symptoms of anxiety or depression worse. This is believed to occur as a result of the changes in brain chemistry from long-term use. Of those who seek help from mental health services for conditions including anxiety disorders such as panic disorder or social phobia, approximately half have alcohol or benzodiazepine dependence issues.

Sometimes anxiety precedes alcohol or benzodiazepine dependence but the alcohol or benzodiazepine dependence acts to keep the anxiety disorders going, often progressively making them worse. However, some people addicted to alcohol or benzodiazepines, when it is explained to them that they have a choice between ongoing poor mental health or quitting and recovering from their symptoms, decide on quitting alcohol or benzodiazepines or both. It has been noted that every individual has an individual sensitivity level to alcohol or sedative hypnotic drugs, and what one person can tolerate without ill health, may cause another to experience very ill health, and even moderate drinking can cause rebound anxiety syndrome and sleep disorders. A person experiencing the toxic effects of alcohol will not benefit from other therapies or medications, as these do not address the root cause of the symptoms.

Nicotine addiction seems to worsen mental health problems. Nicotine withdrawal depresses mood, increases anxiety and stress, and disrupts sleep. Although nicotine products temporarily relieve their nicotine withdrawal symptoms, an addiction causes stress and mood to be worse on average, due to mild withdrawal symptoms between hits. Nicotine addicts need the nicotine to temporarily feel normal. Nicotine industry marketing has claimed that nicotine is both less harmful and therapeutic for people with mental illness, and is a form of self-medication. This claim has been criticised by independent researchers.

Self medicating is a very common precursor to full addictions and the habitual use of any addictive drug has been demonstrated to greatly increase the risk of addiction to additional substances due to long-term neuronal changes. Addiction to any/every drug of abuse tested so far has been correlated with an enduring reduction in the expression of GLT1 (EAAT2) in the nucleus accumbens and is implicated in the drug-seeking behavior expressed nearly universally across all documented addiction syndromes. This long-term dysregulation of glutamate transmission is associated with an increase in vulnerability to both relapse-events after re-exposure to drug-use triggers as well as an overall increase in the likelihood of developing addiction to other reinforcing drugs. Drugs which help to re-stabilize the glutamate system such as N-acetylcysteine have been proposed for the treatment of addiction to cocaine, nicotine, and alcohol.

== Infectious diseases ==
In 89% of countries, antibiotics can be prescribed only by a doctor and supplied only by a pharmacy. Self-medication with antibiotics is defined as "the taking of medicines on one's own initiative or on another person's suggestion, who is not a certified medical professional". It has been identified as one of the primary reasons for the evolution of antimicrobial resistance.

Self-medication with antibiotics is an unsuitable way of using them but a common practice in developing countries. Many people resort to that out of necessity when access to a physician is unavailable because of lockdowns and GP surgery closures, or when the patients have a limited amount of time or money to see a prescribing doctor. While being cited as an important alternative to a formal healthcare system where it may be lacking, self-medication can pose a risk to both the patient and community as a whole. The reasons behind self-medication are unique to each region and can relate to health system, societal, economic, health factors, gender, and age. Risks include allergies, lack of cure, and even death.

Besides developing countries, self-medication with antibiotics is also a problem for higher-income countries. In the European Union the average prevalence was 7% in 2016 with the highest rates in southern countries. There are high rates of self-medication with antibiotics in Russia (83%), Central America (19%) and Latin America (14-26%) too.

Two significant issues with self-medication are the lack of knowledge of the public on, firstly, the dangerous effects of certain antimicrobials (for example, ciprofloxacin, which can cause tendonitis, tendon rupture and aortic dissection) and, secondly, broad microbial resistance and when to seek medical care if the infection is not clearing.

Also inappropriate use of over-the-counter ibuprofen or other nonsteroidal anti-inflammatory drugs during winter influenza outbreaks can lead to death, e.g. due to haemorrhagic duodenitis induced by ibuprofen, or the consequences of exceeding the recommended doses of paracetamol by combining doses of the generic product with proprietary flu-remedies and Tylex (paracetamol and codeine).

In a questionnaire designed to evaluate self-medication rates amongst the population of Khartoum, Sudan, 48.1% of respondents reported self-medicating with antibiotics within the past 30 days, whereas 43.4% reported self-medicating with antimalarials, and 17.5% reported self-medicating with both. Overall, the total prevalence of reported self-medication with one or both classes of anti-infective agents within the past month was 73.9%. Furthermore, according to the associated study, data indicated that self-medication "varies significantly with a number of socio-economic characteristics" and the "main reason that was indicated for the self-medication was financial constraints".

Similarly, in a survey of university students in southern China, 47.8% of respondents reported self-medicating with antibiotics.

== Other uses ==
One area of DIY medicine is self-administered pharmaceutical drugs that are obtained without a prescription, as in the case of DIY transgender hormone therapy which is common among transgender people. Prescription-only lifestyle drugs such as those to treat erectile dysfunction, male pattern baldness, and obesity are often purchased online by people who have no diagnosis or prescription. In 2017, the United Kingdom legalized the sale of sildenafil (Viagra) over the counter in part to cut down on the number of men buying it online from unlicensed pharmacies.

Self-managed abortion with medication is safe and effective, but is illegal in some jurisdictions. Before the current medication had been developed and in places where abortion is illegal, people may resort to unsafe methods of self-managed abortion.

Another area is the creation of medical devices, such as PPE for protection against COVID-19 and epinephrine injectors. Some people with insulin-dependent diabetes have created their own automated insulin delivery systems. One review found that "the quality of glucose control achieved with DIY AID systems is impressively good". With DIY brain stimulation, individuals with depression create their own devices to access an experimental treatment. Other people self-administer fecal transplant as a treatment for various diseases.

== Physicians and medical students ==
In a survey of West Bengal, India undergraduate medical school students, 57% reported self-medicating. The type of drugs most frequently used for self-medication were antibiotics (31%), analgesics (23%), antipyretics (18%), antiulcerics (9%), cough suppressants (8%), multivitamins (6%), and anthelmintics (4%).

Another study indicated that 53% of physicians in Karnataka, India reported self-administration of antibiotics.

== Children ==
A study of Luo children in western Kenya found that 19% reported engaging in self-treatment with either herbal or pharmaceutical medicine. Proportionally, boys were much more likely to self-medicate using conventional medicine than herbal medicine as compared with girls, a phenomenon which was theorized to be influenced by their relative earning potential.

== Regulation ==
Self-medication is highly regulated in much of the world and many classes of drugs are available for administration only upon prescription by licensed medical personnel. Safety, social order, commercialization, and religion have historically been among the prevailing factors that lead to such prohibition.

People trying to buy pharmaceutical drugs online without a prescription may be the victim of fraud, phishing, or receive counterfeit medication. Selling prescription drugs to people without a valid prescription is illegal in many jurisdictions and can be considered an example of transnational organized crime. In a 2021 article, Jack E. Fincham argues that unlicensed sales of prescription drugs online are a significant public health threat. It is also possible to obtain controlled substances such as amphetamine, benzodiazepines, and Z-drugs online without a prescription.

== See also ==
- Alcoholism
- Biodiversity and drugs
- Cognitive liberty
- Coping
- Dual diagnosis
- Emotional eating
- Psychedelic microdosing
- Self-surgery
- Self-diagnosis
- Zoopharmacognosy
