= Syed Ziaur Rahman =

Indian pharmacologist (born 1972)

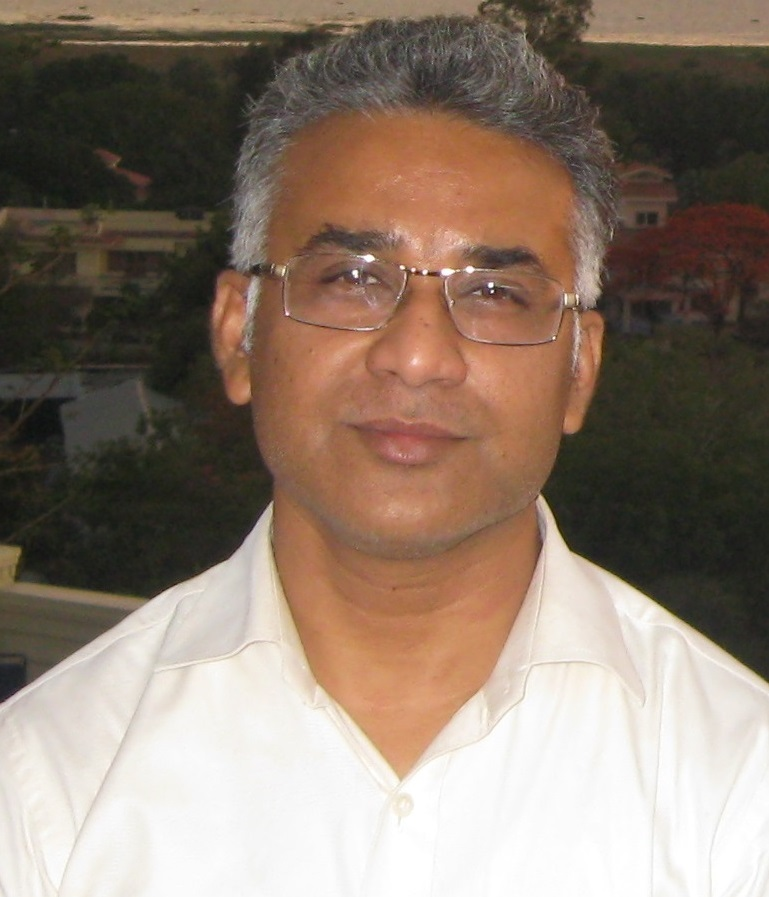
- Born: 10 September 1972 (age 54); Aligarh, Uttar Pradesh, India
- Education: Aligarh Muslim University; University of Western Sydney
- Awards: Servier Young Investigator Award of IUPHAR, International Union of Basic and Clinical Pharmacology
- Website: www.amu.ac.in/faculty/pharmacology/syed-ziaur-rahman

Syed Ziaur Rahman is an Indian pharmacologist. He is a permanent member of 'Board of Trustees' and Chair of the Advisory Council (Section 3), International Association of Medical Colleges (IAOMC). He also served as Chairman, Department of Pharmacology, Jawaharlal Nehru Medical College, Aligarh, Elected Secretary of IAOMC and Society of Pharmacovigilance, India (SoPI).

== Family background and education ==
Syed Ziaur Rahman's father Hakim Syed Zillur Rahman, grandfather Hakim Syed Fazlur Rahman and great grandfather Hakim Syed Karam Husain were all physicians of Unani medicine.

He earned his matriculation in 1987 from Minto Circle, graduation (MBBS) in 1995 and postgraduation (MD) in 2000 from Jawaharlal Nehru Medical College, a part of Aligarh Muslim University, India. His PhD thesis was a part of the project on health, medications and lifestyle factors in relation to self-rated memory from UWS School of Medicine, University of Western Sydney, Australia.

== Contribution in medical science ==
Rahman contributed to the area of Alternatives to animal testing in the field of Pharmacology. He believed in the philosophy of '3Rs" of Russell and Burch" on humane experimental pharmacology. He delivered a series of lectures in 2004 at "Alternatives, Animal Welfare and the Curriculum – A training Seminar and Workshop" in different cities of India. He addressed in the meetings of International Network for Humane Education (InterNICHE) and International Centre for Alternatives in Research and Education (I-CARE). On the recommendation of Medical Council of India (MCI), and after getting survey related to the attitude of undergraduate medical students towards Alternatives to animal testing and Animal experiments, he initiated and established a separate lab on "Alternatives to Animal Experimentation" in the Department of Pharmacology at Jawaharlal Nehru Medical College. This was the first attempt in any medical college of India to have an exclusive lab where experimental work on animals was demonstrated by Computer aided education. In addition, he edited "A guide to alternatives to animal experiment in pharmacology", which was included in the curriculum of second professional MBBS course. He even translated few papers into Urdu in the field of Alternatives to animal testing.

Rahman also works in the field of Traditional medicine with special reference to Unani medicine. While working on morphine de-addiction properties of medicinal plants, he proposed a modified method for moderately and severely induced morphine dependent rats. He specifically screened Delphinium denudatum for its protective activity in morphine induced physical dependence.

His other field of works is Pharmacovigilance and Pharmacoepidemiology. In the field of Pharmacovigilance, he gave the concept of Pharmacoenvironmentology and differentiated the term Ecopharmacology from Pharmacoenvironmentology. However, some scientists also suggest the term, 'EcoPharmacovigilance' and 'PharmEcovigilance' in place of Pharmacoenvironmentology. He started as editor-in-chief, the official journal of the Society of Pharmacovigilance, India (SoPI) in 2003 – "Journal of Pharmacovigilance & Drug Safety (ISSN 0972-8899)". He is the Coordinator of the Regional Training Centre (RTC), Materiovigilance Programme of India (MvPI), and Pharmacovigilance Programme of India (PvPI), Indian Pharmacopoeia Commission, Govt. of India, at JNMC, AMU, Aligarh.

== Medico-social services ==
Rahman is a Trustee and co-founder of Ibn Sina Academy of Medieval Medicine and Sciences. He bequeathed his ancestral property worth of crores of rupees to this Academy. In the Academy, he arranged many medical camps on the occasion of World AIDS Day, World Health Day and World Tuberculosis Day.

Rahman is a fellow and member of many professional academic bodies such as 'Fellow of Faculty of Pharmaceutical Medicine' (FFPM), 'Fellow of International Medical Sciences Academy' (FIMSA), 'Fellow of National Academy of Medical Sciences (FAMS), 'Fellow of Indian Pharmacological Society' (FIPS), 'Elected Member of National Academy of Medical Sciences, India' (MAMS), 'Fellow of IMA Academy of Medical Specialties (FIAMS), 'Fellow of Indian Academy of Biomedical Sciences' (FIABS), Life member of Indian Science Congress Association, Indian Medical Association, Safety Pharmacology Society, Australian and New Zealand Society of the History of Medicine, Australasian Society of Clinical and Experimental Pharmacologists and Toxicologists, International Society for Neurochemistry, International Brain Research Organization, IndiaCLEN (Regional network of INCLEN), Indian Science News Association (Science and Culture), Association of Physiologists and Pharmacologists of India, Indian Pharmacological Society and Academics of Indian origin, Australia.

== Selected awards ==
- International Alumni Leadership Award, Western Sydney University, Australia, 2018
- Mewat Ratan Award 2022 (Literary and Social Contribution)- Global Welfare Foundation, Haryana, India, 2.1.2023
- Pharma Ratan Award 2017 - Excellence in Healthcare, RDM, India, 26.11.2017
- Most Promising Senior Pharmacologists Award 2026, Medical Pharmacologists Society, Bangalore
- International Postgraduate Research Scholarship, Western Sydney University, Australia, 2009-2012
- Dr. S. B. Pandey Oration, International Pharmacology Conference (IPC) & 54th Annual Conference of the Indian Pharmacological Society (IPSCON-2024), 29-30 November 2024 All India Institute of Medical Sciences, New Delhi
- Prof. M. Nasim Ansari Oration, Ibn Sina Academy of Medieval Medicine and Sciences, 14th World Health Day Celebration 2022
- ISN Fellowship, 20th Biennial Meeting of the ISN-European Society for Neurochemistry (ESN), Austria, 2005.
- ISN Fellowship, First Special Neurochemistry Conference, International Society for Neurochemistry (ISN), France, 2004
- WHO Fellowship, Second International Conference on Improving Use of Medicines (ICIUM 2004), Thailand, 2004
- WHO Fellowship, 2nd Asian Course on Problem-Based Pharmacotherapy Teaching, Universiti Kebangsaan Malaysia, Malaysia, 2003.
- APSN Fellowship, 6th Biennial Meeting of the Asia Pacific Society for Neurochemistry, 2004, Hong Kong.
- SPS Junior Scientist Award, Safety Pharmacology Society, USA, 2005 & 2006.
- The African Institute of Biomedical Science and Technology (AiBST) Scholarship, Kenya, 2003
- John Autian Travel Award, Annual Conference of Indian Pharmacological Society, India, 1998 and 2002.

== Selected publications ==
- Syed Ziaur Rahman (2020). Pharmacology of Avicennian Cardiac Drugs (first ed.). Ibn Sina Academy of Medieval Medicine and Sciences. ISBN 9789380610436.
- Syed Ziaur Rahman; M. Tariq Salman (2019). A Guide to the Alternatives to Animal Experimentation (fourth ed.). Ibn Sina Academy of Medieval Medicine and Sciences. ISBN 9788190607087.
- Syed Ziaur Rahman (2016). Self-rated memory of individuals' associated with demographic profiles, lifestyle parameters, health status and medication use. Ibn Sina Academy of Medieval Medicine and Sciences. ISBN 978-93-80610-24-5.
- Rahman, Syed Ziaur (2008). An Introduction to Environmental Pharmacology. Ibn Sina Academy of Medieval Medicine and Sciences. ISBN 9788190607049.
- Rahman, Syed Ziaur (2000). History of Non Resident Students' Centre, AMU, Aligarh. Ibn Sina Academy of Medieval Medicine and Sciences.
- Rahman, Syed Ziaur (1998). The Glowing Legend of Sir Syed – A Centennial Tribute. Aligarh, India: Aligarh Muslim University.
- Rahman, Syed Ziaur (1997). Aligarh in My Days. Aligarh, India: NRSC, Aligarh Muslim University.

== See also ==
- Environmental Impact of Pharmaceutical Drugs
- Environmental pharmacology
- Pharmacovigilance
- Alternatives to animal testing
- Lifestyle drug
