= Society of Pharmacovigilance, India =

The Society of Pharmacovigilance, India (SoPI), is an Indian national non-profit scientific organisation, which aims at organizing training programmes and providing expertise in pharmacovigilance and enhance all aspects of the safe and proper use of medicines

The International Society of Pharmacovigilance (ISoP) granted status of 'associated society' to Society of Pharmacovigilance India (SoPI). It is the second professional society in the world after ISoP.

The founder of SoPI is KC Singhal.

== Annual Events ==
- 14th Annual Conference of SoPI (SoPICON 2014), Aligarh, India
- 19th Annual Conference of SoPI (SoPICON 2022), Online/Hybrid

== Official Publication ==
- Journal of Pharmacovigilance and Drug Safety (ISSN: 0972-8899)

== Office Bearers ==
- Prof. KC Singhal (Patron)
- Dr. Sandeep Agarwal (President)
- Prof. Syed Ziaur Rahman (General Secretary)

== See also ==
- Uppsala Monitoring Centre (WHO)
- Council for International Organizations of Medical Sciences
- EudraVigilance
