= PN Saxena =

Indian pharmacologist

Prem Narain Saxena (15 October 1925 – 29 November 1999) was the Founder Professor and Chairman of the Department of Pharmacology, Jawaharlal Nehru Medical College, India. He made contributions to the fields of traditional medicine and neuropharmacology. His demonstration of the wound-healing property of Curcuma longa was a major contributor to India's successful challenge of the US patent on the wound-healing property of Haldi. He was involved in discovery and pre-clinical development of the non-barbiturate hypnotic Methaqualone. His basic studies have helped in understanding the role of various neurotransmitters in thermoregulation. He also standardized the use of Setaria cervi for discovery of new anti-filarial agents.

== Biography ==
Prem Narain Saxena was born on 15 October 1925, in the village of Bithri-chainpur, Bareilly. He was the first child of his parents, Raghunandan Prasad and Saraswati Devi, and had three sisters. He married Rajeshwari Saxena.

== Education ==
He was awarded his PhD from the Patna University in 1963 and his DSc from the Aligarh Muslim University, Aligarh, in 1978.

== Career ==
He joined the Department of Pharmacology of Jawaharlal Nehru Medical College, Aligarh Muslim University, Aligarh, on 14 April 1964 as Professor and Founder Chairman Department of Pharmacology. He served a period as Head Department of Pharmacology till 30 September 1985 and in view of his outstanding merits, he was re-employed by the University for the two years to 30 September 1987. Soon after retirement, he was selected as emeritus scientist of the ICMR, New Delhi, for a period from 1 September 1987, which he served till 14 September 1990. On 31 January 1991, the University appointed him as professor emeritus.

In the university, he had also acted as Dean, Faculty of Medicine, In-charge, Animal House and on few occasions as acting Principal Ajmal Khan Tibbiya College and acting Vice Chancellor of the University. As a Professor Emeritus, he continued his active research in the Department of Pharmacology till late December 1994.

== Contribution, awards and achievements ==
He was awarded the Fellowship of Rockefeller Foundation Fellow in USA during 1960–61; Commonwealth Medical Fellowship and then Wellcome Research Fellowship in England during the 1970s. In London at the National Institute for Medical Research, he worked on mechanism of action of Pyrogen and in the field of thermoregulation, with Wilhelm Feldberg (1900–1993), a German-British-Jewish pharmacologist and biologist. Wilhelm Feldberg assisted many research workers who came to England as a part of their Commonwealth Medical Fellowship and Wellcome Research Fellowship. Under these Fellowships, Saxena and Feldberg published many papers during the 1970s.

In total, Saxena has approximately 145 published research papers. He wrote Hospital Formulary in 1969 and a book-cum-manual for practical pharmacy and experimental pharmacology laboratory.

He had been founding member of many academic bodies such Indian Pharmacological Society, Association of Physiologists and Pharmacologists of India, Indian Medical Association, Indian Academy of Neurosciences and Indian Association for the Advancement of Medical Education in India. Indian National Science Academy (INSA) elected him Fellow (FNA) in 1987.

== See also ==
- KC Singhal, student
- Syed Ziaur Rahman, student

== Sources ==
This article incorporates text from a free content work. Licensed under Creative Commons Attribution (license statement/permission). Text taken from Late Professor P N Saxena: A teacher of excellence, Rahman, SZ; Khan, RA (Nov 2010), J Pharmacol Pharmacother.
