= Wilhelm Feldberg =

German-British physiologist and biologist

Wilhelm Feldberg CBE FRS
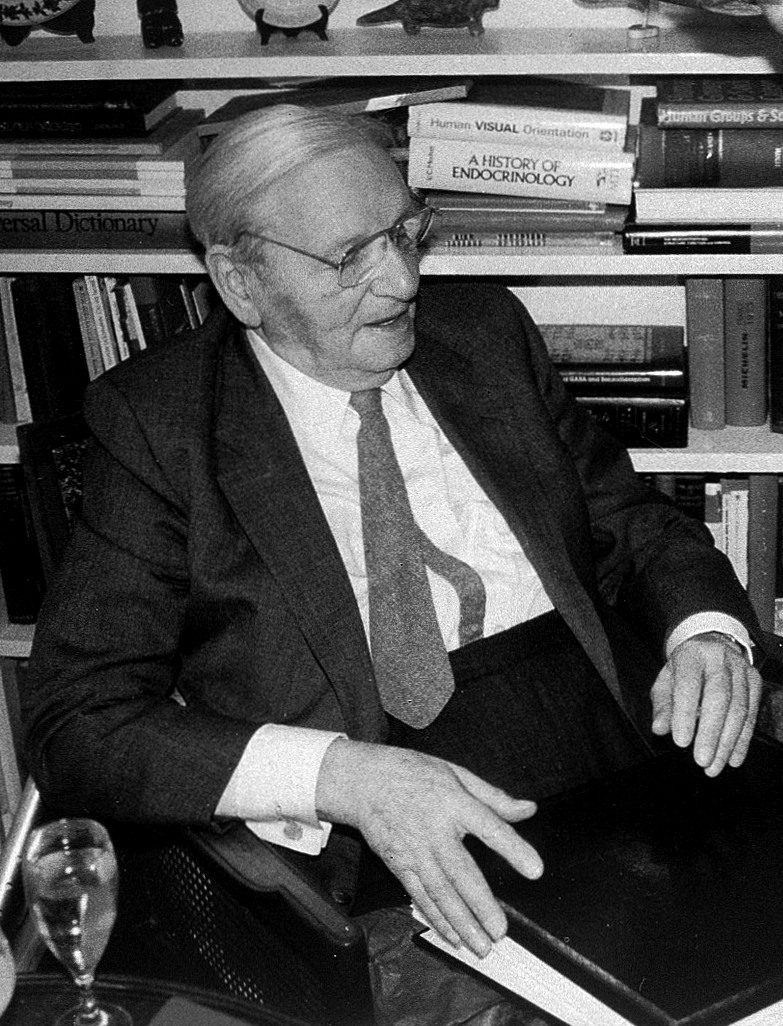
- Born: 19 November 1900; Hamburg, Germany
- Died: 23 October 1993 (aged 92); London, UK
- Scientific career
- Fields: physiology biology
- Institutions: Physiological Institute; National Institute for Medical Research; Cambridge University

Wilhelm Siegmund Feldberg CBE FRS (19 November 1900 – 23 October 1993) was a German-British physiologist and biologist.

== Biography ==
Feldberg was born in Hamburg to a wealthy middle class Jewish family. He studied medicine at Heidelberg, Munich and Berlin, graduating in 1925. He was the brother of the painter Lore Feldberg-Eber [de]. In the same year he moved with his new wife to England and studied first under John Newport Langley at Cambridge and then Henry Dale at Hampstead. In 1927 he returned to the Physiological Institute in Berlin but he was dismissed in 1933 during the Nazi purge of Jewish scientists. With the aid of Archibald Hill's Academic Assistance Council, Feldberg was relocated to Britain's National Institute for Medical Research in 1934–36. Here, he worked with Henry Hallett Dale, providing a significant impetus for Dale's Nobel Prize winning research into chemical neurotransmission. Feldberg was subsequently offered a place in Australia, at the behest of Charles Kellaway, director of the Walter and Eliza Hall Institute of Medical Research. He spent two years (1936–38) in Melbourne, joining Kellaway's snake venom research programme. This work developed into a study of tissue responses to direct and indirect insult, focusing particularly on the liberation of histamine and other endogenous mediators. A finding of lasting pharmacological interest from these studies was the identification and partial isolation of the slow-reacting substance of anaphylaxis. Although Feldberg had earned a fellowship supported by the Australian National Health and Medical Research Council, in 1938 he was offered a readership in physiology at Cambridge University. He returned to England to take up this post, remaining there throughout World War II until 1949. Feldberg's subsequent appointments include: Head of Physiology and Pharmacology Division, National Institute for Medical Research, London, 1949–65 (Honorary Head of Division, 1965–66); Head, Laboratory of Neuropharmacology, National Institute for Medical Research, 1966–74. He was elected a Fellow of the Royal Society in 1947 and made a Commander of the Order of the British Empire in 1963.

Wilhelm Feldberg assisted many research workers who came to England as a part of their Commonwealth Medical Fellowship and Wellcome Research Fellowship. Under this Fellowships, Professor PN Saxena and Prof. KP Gupta of the Department of Pharmacology, Jawaharlal Nehru Medical College, Aligarh Muslim University, during the 1970s got many papers published together with Wilhelm Feldberg while their vocation at National Institute for Medical Research, Mill Hill.

== Controversy ==
Feldberg's career was ended in 1990 when two animal rights activists gained access to his lab on the pretence of writing a biography and filming an educational video. Their claims were printed in The Independent. An investigation by the Medical Research Council found that some breaches of regulations had occurred. While these may not have been Feldberg's fault, he was deemed responsible and his Home Office Project Licence was revoked. One of the animal rights activists involved, Melody MacDonald, detailed her claims in her 1994 book Caught in the Act: The Feldberg Investigation (ISBN 1-897766-05-X).

Feldberg became infamous, as MacDonald puts it, for his severe cruelty during animal research experiments. In the year of 1990, an investigation by the animal welfare group Advocates for Animals revealed experiments in which rabbits were regularly burned and operated on without adequate anaesthesia, or even at all, and sometimes even without being covered by a licence.

These revelations came when Feldberg was 89 years old. These experiments took place at the National Institute for Medical Research laboratories, Mill Hill, in London, which relate to the functions and decisions of the Home Department. These experiments took place between 1989 and 1990.

Along with Feldberg's technician Mr. Stean, the Medical Research Council Inquiry found that he caused both unnecessary suffering to animals.

MacDonald reports that Feldberg experimented by pouring various chemicals into the brains of cats while alive and fully conscious. However, as MacDonald and the inquiry found, it was his experiments on rabbits that brought about his downfall and subsequent sacking in 1990. This was just four months after he was awarded the Wellcome Gold Medal in Pharmacology by the British Pharmacological Society.

On 26 May 1994 the book Caught in the Act: The Feldberg Investigation by Melody MacDonald exposed his alleged malpractice to the world.
