= Qualified person (European Union) =

Under European Union (EU) law, the qualified person (QP) is responsible for certifying that each batch of a medicinal product meets all required provisions when released from a manufacturing facility within the EU, or imported into the EU. Such provisions include that the batch was manufactured under appropriate standards, and that it passed all required testing.

The regulations specify that no batch of medicinal product can be released for sale or supply prior to certification by a QP that the batch is in accordance with the relevant requirements.(EudraLex, Volume 4, Chapter 1) The QP is typically a licensed pharmacist, biologist or chemist (or a person with another permitted academic qualification) who has several years' experience working in pharmaceutical manufacturing operations, and has passed examinations attesting to his or her knowledge. The requirement for QP oversight has been extended to material for use in clinical trials since the introduction of EU Directive 2001/20/EC.

In countries that are part of the Pharmaceutical Inspection Convention and Pharmaceutical Inspection Co-operation Scheme (PIC/S), the same role may be termed responsible person (RP) or authorized person (AP).

== See also ==
- European Medicines Agency
- EUDRANET
