= International Society of Pharmacovigilance =

The International Society of Pharmacovigilance (ISoP), previously the European Society of Pharmacovigilance (ESoP), is an international non-profit scientific organisation, which aims to foster pharmacovigilance both scientifically and educationally, and enhance all aspects of the safe and proper use of medicines, in all countries. Its official journal is Drug Safety.

== See also ==
- Uppsala Monitoring Centre (UMC)
- Council for International Organizations of Medical Sciences
- EudraVigilance
- Society of Pharmacovigilance, India
