= Edward Khantzian =

American addiction psychiatrist

Edward Khantzian was a professor of psychiatry at Harvard Medical School. Beginning in the 1970s, he developed a progressively more coherent and empirically-grounded self-medication hypothesis of drug abuse, which states that individuals use drugs in an attempt to self-medicate states of distress and suffering.

Dr. Khantzian was a first generation Armenian-American born in Haverhill Massachusetts. His parents were born in Turkey, his father immigrated to the United States in 1912. Khantzian's mother survived the Armenian genocide that started in 1915, moving to the U.S. in the late 1920s. Edward Khantzian was born in 1935 and grew up in Haverhill, a shoe town, where both parents worked in the then flourishing shoe industry.

Educated in local school systems, he began his university studies in the Evening Divisions of Merrimack College and Boston University, graduating from the latter in 1958. After working as a technical writer for Raytheon for one year, he commenced his medical training at Albany Medical College in 1959, and graduated in 1963. He completed an internship at Rhode Island Hospital in Providence, Rhode Island. Subsequently, he commenced his training in psychiatry at the Massachusetts Mental Health Mental Center, a Harvard Medical School-affiliated facility. He joined the staff and Harvard teaching faculty at Cambridge Hospital, where he worked for most of his career. He completed psychoanalytic training at the Boston Psychoanalytic Society and Institute in 1973.

Starting early in his career he became involved in multiple clinical and investigative studies of addiction, with an emphasis on pursuing a psychodynamic understanding of the psychological vulnerabilities that predispose to addictive disorders. Considered a pioneer in addiction studies, he gained recognition for his development of the self-medication hypothesis. He also developed modified psychodynamic individual and group treatments for alcohol and other drug dependent individuals, as well as exploring ingredients that seem to make 12-step programs effective.

Khantzian was a founding member and past president of the American Academy of Addiction Psychiatry. In 2016, the Massachusetts Psychiatric Society awarded Khantzian with their Lifetime Achievement Award.

Khantzian died at age 85 on March 21, 2021.
