= Trans European Services for Telematics between Administrations =

The Trans European Services for Telematics between Administrations (TESTA) system is the private IP-based network of the European Union. TESTA is a telecommunications interconnection platform for secure information exchange between the European and member state administrations. It is currently handled within the ISA² European programme.

TESTA is not a single network, but a network of networks, composed of the EuroDomain backbone and Local Domain networks. The EuroDomain is a European backbone network for administrative data exchanges acting as a network communication platform between local administrations.

== History ==
The TESTA network has been upgraded several times, with added features through the years:

- 1st generation (TESTA): 1996–2000
- 2nd generation (TESTA-II): 2000–2006
- 3rd generation (sTESTA): 2006–2013
- 4th generation (TESTA-NG): since 2013

== See also ==
- European Network and Information Security Agency
- EUDRANET
