= Drug =

Substance having effect(s) on the body of an individual

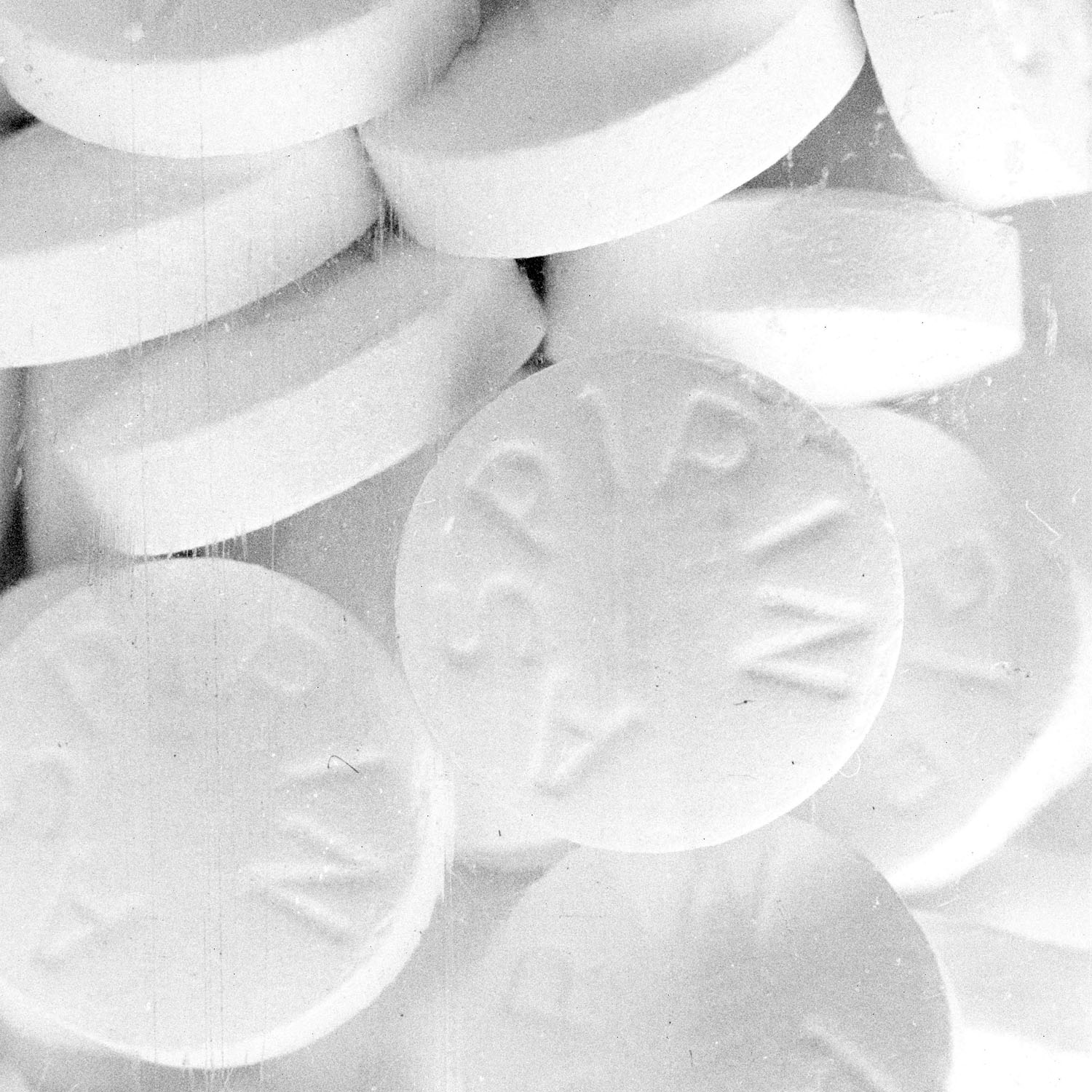
Uncoated aspirin tablets, consisting of about 90% acetylsalicylic acid, along with a minor amount of inert fillers and binders. Aspirin is a pharmaceutical drug often used to treat pain, fever, and inflammation.

A drug is any chemical substance other than a nutrient or an essential dietary ingredient, which, when administered to a living organism, produces a biological effect. Consumption of drugs can be via inhalation, injection, smoking, ingestion, absorption via a patch on the skin, suppository, or dissolution under the tongue.

A pharmaceutical drug, also called a medication or medicine, is a chemical substance used to treat, cure, prevent, or diagnose a disease or to promote well-being. Traditionally drugs were obtained through extraction from medicinal plants, but more recently also by organic synthesis. Pharmaceutical drugs may be used for a limited duration, or on a regular basis for chronic disorders.

== Classification ==
Pharmaceutical drugs are often classified into drug classes—groups of related drugs that have similar chemical structures, the same mechanism of action (binding to the same biological target), a related mode of action, and that are used to treat the same disease. The Anatomical Therapeutic Chemical Classification System (ATC), the most widely used drug classification system, assigns drugs a unique ATC code, which is an alphanumeric code that assigns it to specific drug classes within the ATC system. Another major classification system is the Biopharmaceutics Classification System. This classifies drugs according to their solubility and permeability or absorption properties.

Psychoactive drugs are substances that affect the function of the central nervous system, altering perception, mood or consciousness. These drugs are divided into different groups such as: stimulants, depressants, antidepressants, anxiolytics, antipsychotics, and hallucinogens. These psychoactive drugs have been proven useful in treating a wide range of medical conditions including mental disorders around the world. The most widely used drugs in the world include caffeine, nicotine and alcohol, which are also considered recreational drugs, since they are used for pleasure rather than medicinal purposes. All drugs can have potential side effects. Abuse of several psychoactive drugs can cause addiction or physical dependence. Excessive use of stimulants can promote stimulant psychosis. Many recreational drugs are illicit; international treaties such as the Single Convention on Narcotic Drugs exist for the purpose of their prohibition.

== Etymology ==
In English, the noun "drug" is thought to originate from Old French "drogue", possibly deriving from "droge (vate)" from Middle Dutch meaning "dry (barrels)", referring to medicinal plants preserved as dry matter in barrels.

In the 1990s however, Spanish lexicographer Federico Corriente Córdoba documented the possible origin of the word in {ḥṭr} an early romanized form of the Al-Andalus language from the northwestern part of the Iberian peninsula. The term could approximately be transcribed as حطروكة or hatruka.

The term "drug" has become a skunked term with negative connotation, being used as a synonym for illegal substances like cocaine or heroin or for drugs used recreationally. In other contexts the terms "drug" and "medicine" are used interchangeably.

== Efficacy ==
Drug action is highly specific and their effects may only be detected in certain individuals. For instance, the 10 highest-grossing drugs in the US may help only 4-25% of people. Often, the activity of a drug depends on the genotype of a patient. For example, Erbitux (cetuximab) increases the survival rate of colorectal cancer patients if they carry a particular mutation in the EGFR gene. Some drugs are specifically approved for certain genotypes. Vemurafenib is such a case which is used for melanoma patients who carry a mutation in the BRAF gene. The number of people who benefit from a drug determines if drug trials are worth carrying out, given that phase III trials may cost between $100 million and $700 million per drug. This is the motivation behind personalized medicine, that is, to develop drugs that are adapted to individual patients.

== Medication ==
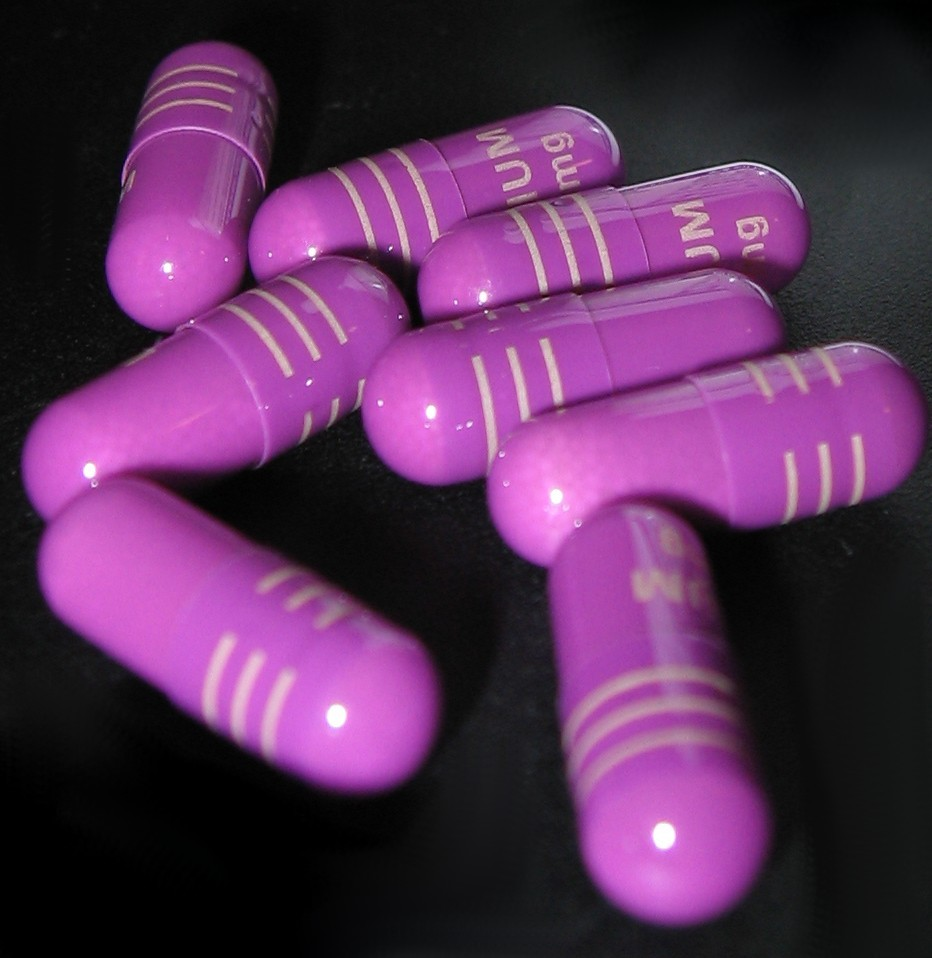
Nexium (Esomeprazole) is a proton-pump inhibitor. It is used to reduce the production of stomach acid.

A medication or medicine is a drug taken to cure or ameliorate any symptoms of an illness or medical condition. The use may also be as preventive medicine that has future benefits but does not treat any existing or pre-existing diseases or symptoms. Dispensing of medication is often regulated by governments into three categories—over-the-counter medications, which are available in pharmacies and supermarkets without special restrictions; behind-the-counter medicines, which are dispensed by a pharmacist without needing a doctor's prescription, and prescription only medicines, which must be prescribed by a licensed medical professional, usually a physician.

In the United Kingdom, behind-the-counter medicines are called pharmacy medicines which can only be sold in registered pharmacies, by or under the supervision of a pharmacist. These medications are designated by the letter P on the label. The range of medicines available without a prescription varies from country to country. Medications are typically produced by pharmaceutical companies and are often patented to give the developer exclusive rights to produce them. Those that are not patented (or with expired patents) are called generic drugs since they can be produced by other companies without restrictions or licenses from the patent holder.

== Spiritual and religious use ==
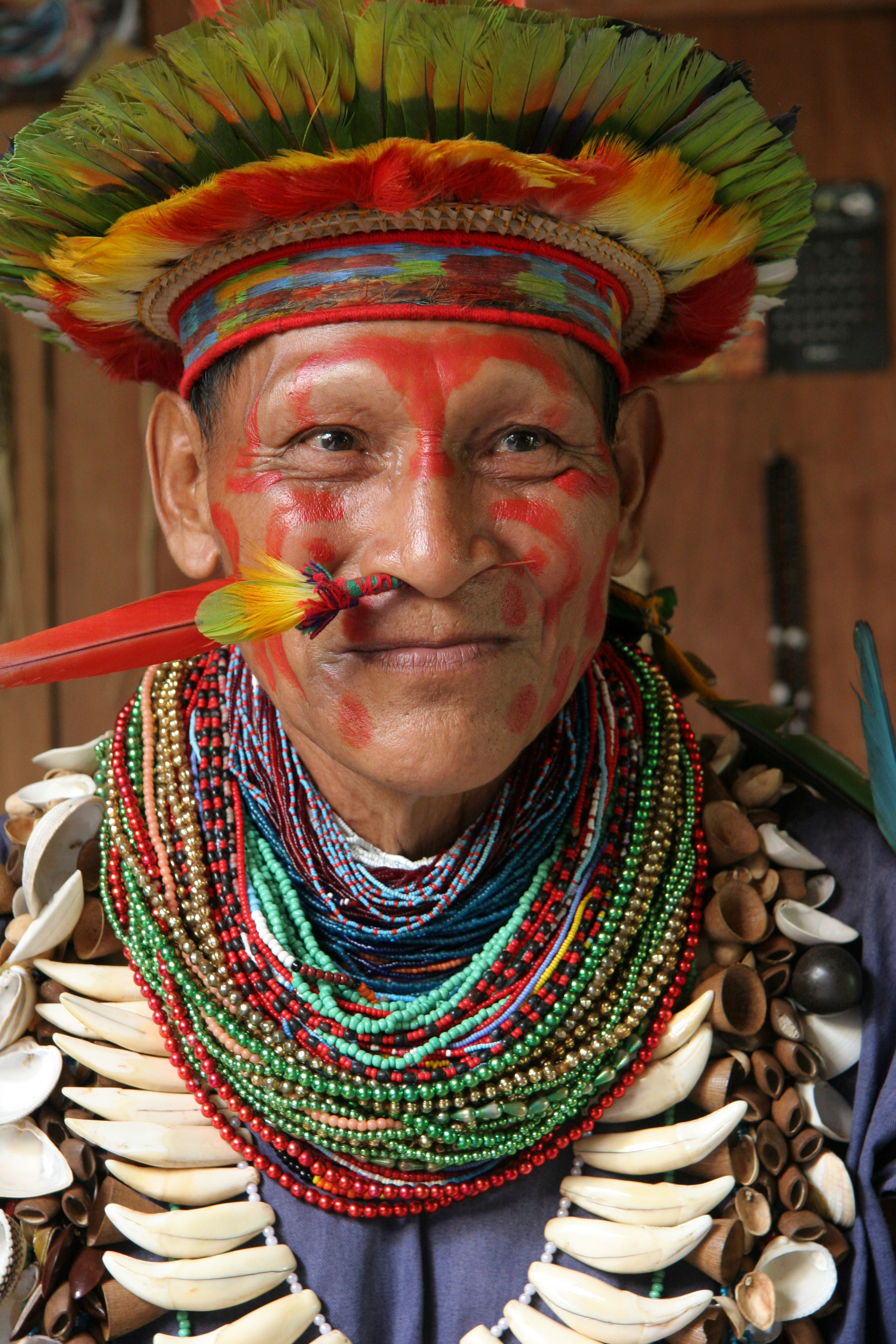
An Amazonian shaman from Ecuador

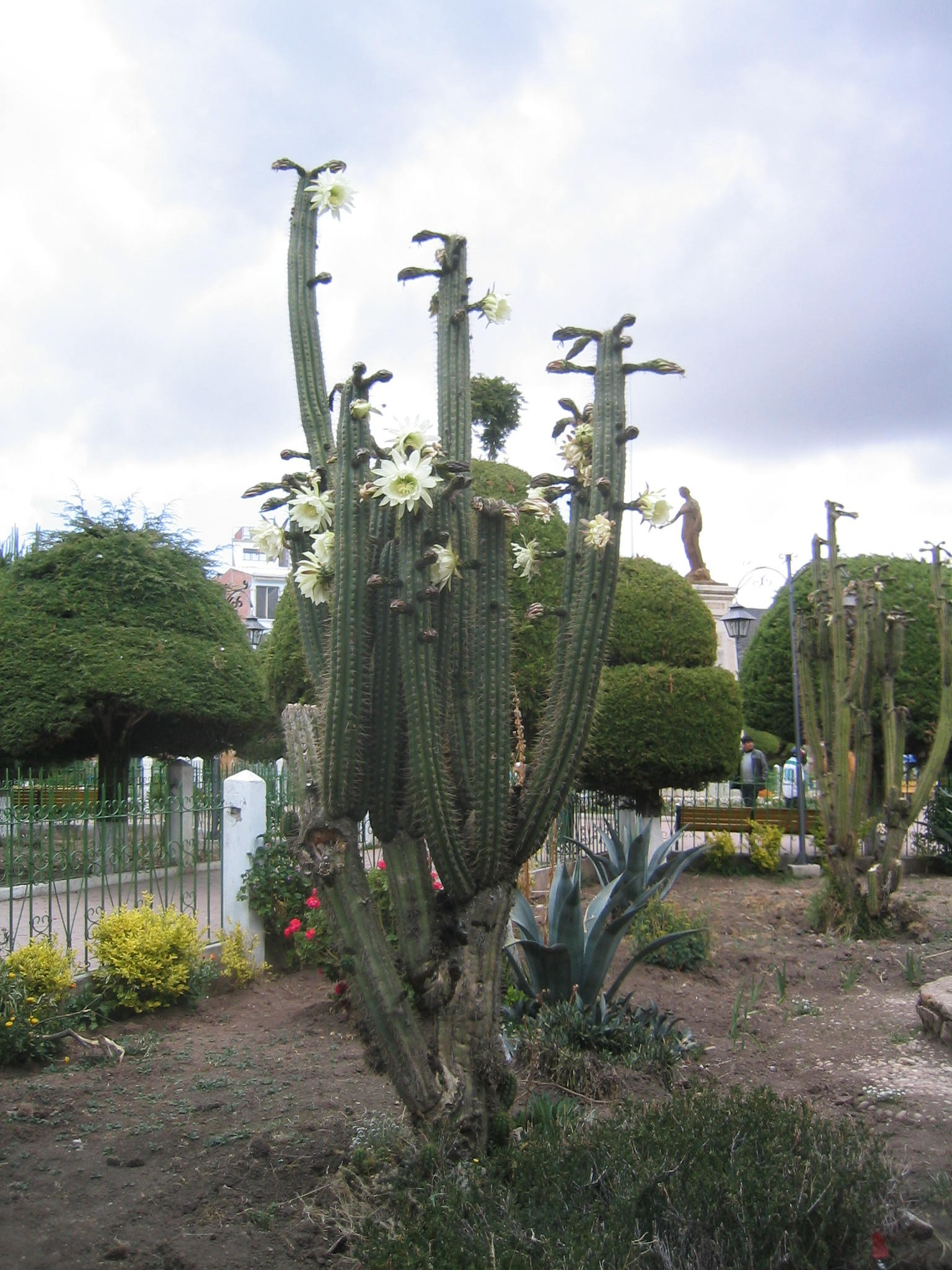
San Pedro, a psychoactive cactus

Some religions, particularly ethnic religions, are based completely on the use of certain drugs, known as entheogens, which are mostly hallucinogens—psychedelics, dissociatives, or deliriants. Some entheogens include kava which can act as a stimulant, a sedative, a euphoriant and an anesthetic. The roots of the kava plant are used to produce a drink consumed throughout the cultures of the Pacific Ocean.

Some shamans from different cultures use entheogens, defined as "generating the divine within," to achieve religious ecstasy. Amazonian shamans use ayahuasca (yagé), a hallucinogenic brew, for this purpose. Mazatec shamans have a long and continuous tradition of religious use of Salvia divinorum, a psychoactive plant. Its use is to facilitate visionary states of consciousness during spiritual healing sessions.

Silene undulata is regarded by the Xhosa people as a sacred plant and used as an entheogen. Its roots are traditionally used to induce vivid (and according to the Xhosa, prophetic) lucid dreams during the initiation process of shamans, classifying it as a naturally occurring oneirogen similar to the more well-known dream herb Calea ternifolia.

Peyote, a small spineless cactus, has been a major source of psychedelic mescaline and has probably been used by Native Americans for at least five thousand years. Most mescaline is now obtained from a few species of columnar cacti in particular from San Pedro and not from the vulnerable peyote.

The entheogenic use of cannabis has also been widely practised for centuries. Rastafari use marijuana (ganja) as a sacrament in their religious ceremonies.

Psychedelic mushrooms (psilocybin mushrooms), commonly called magic mushrooms or shrooms have also long been used as entheogens.

== Nootropics, designer and synthetic drugs ==
Nootropics, also commonly referred to as "smart drugs", are drugs that are claimed to improve human cognitive abilities. Nootropics are used to improve memory, concentration, thought, mood, and learning. An increasingly used nootropic among students, also known as a study drug, is methylphenidate branded commonly as Ritalin and used for the treatment of attention deficit hyperactivity disorder (ADHD) and narcolepsy. At high doses methylphenidate can become highly addictive. Serious addiction can lead to psychosis, anxiety and heart problems, and the use of this drug is related to a rise in suicides, and overdoses. Evidence of use outside of student settings is limited but suggests that it is commonplace. Intravenous use of methylphenidate can lead to emphysematous damage to the lungs, known as Ritalin lung.

Other drugs known as designer drugs are produced. An early example of what today would be labelled a 'designer drug' was LSD, which was synthesised from ergot. Other examples include analogs of performance-enhancing drugs such as designer steroids taken to improve physical capabilities; these are sometimes used (legally or not) for this purpose, often by professional athletes. Other designer drugs mimic the effects of psychoactive drugs. Since the late 1990s many of these synthesised drugs have been created. In Japan and the United Kingdom this has spurred the addition of many designer drugs into a newer class of controlled substances known as a temporary class drug.

Synthetic cannabinoids have been produced for a longer period of time and are used in the designer drug synthetic cannabis.

== Recreational drug use ==
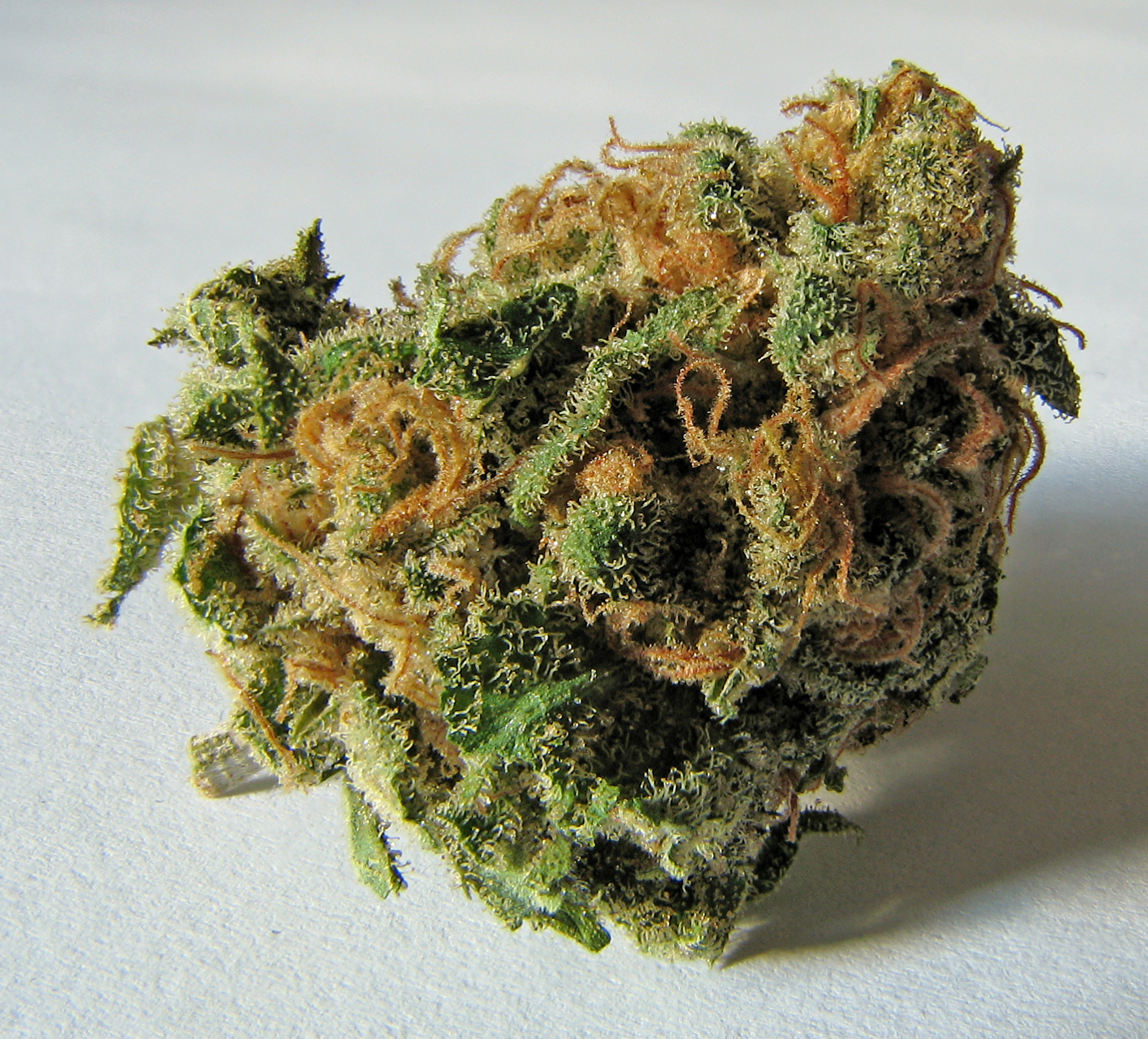
Cannabis is a commonly used recreational drug.

Recreational drug use is the use of a drug (legal, controlled, or illegal) with the primary intention of altering the state of consciousness through alteration of the central nervous system in order to create positive emotions and feelings. The hallucinogen LSD is a psychoactive drug commonly used as a recreational drug.

Ketamine is a drug used for anesthesia, and is also used as a recreational drug, both in powder and liquid form, for its hallucinogenic and dissociative effects.

Some national laws prohibit the use of different recreational drugs; medicinal drugs that have the potential for recreational use are often heavily regulated. However, there are many recreational drugs that are legal in many jurisdictions and widely culturally accepted. Cannabis is the most commonly consumed controlled recreational drug in the world.

There may be an age restriction on the consumption and purchase of legal recreational drugs. Some recreational drugs that are legal and accepted in many places include alcohol, tobacco, betel nut, and caffeine products, and in some areas of the world the legal use of drugs such as khat is common.

== Administration of drugs ==
All drugs have a route of administration, and many can be administered by more than one.

- Inhaled (breathed into the lungs) as an aerosol, inhaler, vape or dry powder (this includes smoking or vaping a substance).
- Injection as a solution, suspension or emulsion either: intramuscular, intravenous, intraperitoneal, intraosseous.
- Insufflation, as a nasal spray or snorting into the nose.
- Orally, as a liquid or solid, that is absorbed through the intestines.
- Rectally as a suppository, that is absorbed by the rectum or colon.
- Sublingually, diffusing into the blood through tissues under the tongue.
- Topically, usually as a cream or ointment. A drug administered in this manner may be given to act locally or systemically.
- Vaginally as a pessary, primarily to treat vaginal infections.

A bolus is the administration of a medication, drug or other compound that is given to raise its concentration in blood rapidly to an effective level, regardless of the route of administration.

== Control of drugs ==
Numerous governmental offices in many countries deal with the control and supervision of drug manufacture and use, and the implementation of various drug laws. The Single Convention on Narcotic Drugs is an international treaty brought about in 1961 to prohibit the use of narcotics save for those used in medical research and treatment. In 1971, a second treaty the Convention on Psychotropic Substances had to be introduced to deal with newer recreational psychoactive and psychedelic drugs.

The legal status of Salvia divinorum varies in many countries and even in states within the United States. Where it is legislated against, the degree of prohibition also varies.

The Food and Drug Administration (FDA) in the United States is a federal agency responsible for protecting and promoting public health through the regulation and supervision of food safety, tobacco products, dietary supplements, prescription and over-the-counter medications, vaccines, biopharmaceuticals, blood transfusions, medical devices, electromagnetic radiation emitting devices, cosmetics, animal foods and veterinary drugs.

In India, the Narcotics Control Bureau (NCB), an Indian federal law enforcement and intelligence agency under the Ministry of Home Affairs, is tasked with combating drug trafficking and international use of illegal substances under the provisions of Narcotic Drugs and Psychotropic Substances Act.

== See also ==
- Club drug
- Controlled Substances Act
- Drug checking
- Drug development
- Drug policy
- Inverse benefit law
- Lifestyle drug
- Medical cannabis
- Nonsteroidal anti-inflammatory drug
- Pharmacognosy
- Placebo
- Prodrug
- Specialty drugs (United States)
- United Nations Office on Drugs and Crime

=== Lists of drugs ===
- List of drugs
- List of pharmaceutical companies
- List of psychoactive plants
- List of Schedule I drugs (US)
