= Drug Safety =

- Discipline: Pharmacology, pharmacovigilance
- Language: English
- Edited by: Nitin Joshi

Publication details
- Former names: Medical Toxicology, Medical Toxicology and Adverse Drug Experience
- History: 1986-present
- Publisher: Adis International Springer Nature
- Frequency: Monthly
- Impact factor: 5.9 (2025)

Standard abbreviations
- ISO 4: Drug Saf.

Indexing
- CODEN: DRSAEA
- ISSN: 0114-5916 (print); 1179-1942 (web)
- OCLC no.: 21000223

Links
- Journal homepage; Online archive

Drug Safety is a peer-reviewed medical journal covering pharmacoepidemiology and pharmacovigilance. It was established in 1986 as Medical Toxicology, and was renamed Medical Toxicology and Adverse Drug Experience in 1987. It obtained its current name in 1990. It is published by Springer Nature under the Adis Reprint, and is the official journal of the International Society of Pharmacovigilance. Nitin Joshi BPharm, PGDiPharm, MRSNZ, FISoP is the editor-in-chief. He took over as the Editor-in-Chief of the journal in 2012. According to the Journal Citation Reports, the journal has a 2024 impact factor of 3.8.
