= EudraGMP =

EudraGMP is the database of the European Community of manufacturing authorisations and of certificates of good manufacturing practice. The EudraGMP system was launched in April 2007, for use by European Medicines Regulators. Access for the general public, via Internet, is available since 2009 using the URL : http://eudragmp.ema.europa.eu.

EudraGMP is part of the EU telematics strategy, which has been conceived in order to meet the strategic objectives of the European Commission, the European Medicines Agency and the Member State competent authorities.

EudraGMP is part of a larger database known as EudraGMDP, which contains information on:

- “Manufacturing and import authorisations
- Good manufacturing Practice (GMP) certificates
- Statements of non-compliance with GMP
- GMP inspection planning in third countries”

The public database allows the general public access to information regarding manufacturing inspections completed by regulatory authorities from all European Economic Area (EEA) countries. Prior to the enactment of the EudraGMP database, information only came from a limited number of European countries. The European regulatory authorities update the database continuously and expect it to grow extensively over the next few years as more “GMP certificates are imported each year.”

The database serves as a quick reference for checking the good manufacturing practice (GMP) of a potential contract manufacturer. One can search by the “company name, location, or certificate number and find details on the types of products or activities that the company conducts and the date of the most recent GMP inspection.”

== See also ==
- European Medicines Agency
- EUDRANET
- EudraCT
- EudraPharm
- EudraVigilance
- GxP
