= International Association of Medical Colleges =

- Founded: 2005
- Founder: Bernie Ferguson, JD
- Purpose: Medical Education
- Location: United States
- Region served: International
- Key people: James Appleyard (president)
- Website: International Association of Medical Colleges website

International Association of Medical Colleges (IAOMC) is a professional association, basically meant for peer evaluation of the medical education and maintaining uniform standards and recognition of physicians qualifications provided by individual medical schools anywhere in the world.

== Brief Notability ==
- The United Nations Department of Economic and Social Affairs (ECOSOC) granted the IAOMC Special Consultive status as a NGO. It is a non-stock, democratic and not for profit association.
- IAOMC is a dues paying partner member of the International Association of Medical Regulatory Authorities (IAMRA) and is listed under the United States of America.
- IAOMC is a recognised body by Union of International Association (A Research Institute and Documentation Centre, founded in 1907 and based in Brussels).

== Aims and objectives ==
- Its goal is to serve society and those with an interest in the evaluation of the quality of undergraduate medical education and to enhance further the medical education and medical practice. The standards and process of the IAOMC is transparent and the evaluation results are available to the public to inspire confidence in integrity of the process and findings.
- IAOMC with its regulatory panel verifies and reviews the integrity of medical colleges' regulation.

== Administrative Bodies ==
=== Advisory Council ===
"The council serves as an open international forum to provide a medium for ideas, assemble data, scholarly study, and obtain the consensus of experts. The Chair of each section serve as a member of the Board of Directors. The three sections are;

Section 1. Experienced, expert, medical administrators or educators.

Section 2. Senior government regulators/Administrators or Medical Board members.

Section 3. Distinguished Representatives of Countries, Regions, or Organizations"

=== Site Visitor Panel ===
After an applicant school provides complete documentation and the Evaluator reports the school is prepared for site visitors, staff will establish dates agreeable to the school and site visitors. A Site Visitor Panel Member is one who has indicated a willingness to serve as a site visitor or evaluator. The Panel provides a sufficient number of pre-qualified, impartial individuals to allow availability for selected dates. To publicly insure expertise and impartiality the site visitor's qualifications are published. The site visitor panelist will be divided into one or more of three categories, basic science, clinical scientist and administrator.

The Site visitor panel is independent; its members bi-annually elect the panel's Chair and Secretary from among its members. The current Panel Chair will have a voting, permanent seat on the board of trustees. The Panel has its own by laws.

=== Regulator Panel ===
An independent Regulator/administrator observer panel accompany the site visitors to provide governments, and its citizen's assurance the accreditation process has been properly done. Panel members express their individual opinion and not acting on behalf of their government - unless authorized to do so. Panel member's qualifications and experiences are published for public assurance.

The Regulator/administrator panel is an independent; its members bi-annually elect the panel's Chair, Secretary and treasurer from among its members. The current Panel Chair have a non-voting, permanent seat on the board of trustees. The Panel has its own by laws.

=== Ethics Committee ===
The Ethics Committee is composed of both practicing physicians and prominent scientifically trained academic teachers of medical ethics.

== World's first and only International Medical School Accreditor ==
Some countries have endorsed IAOMC to accredit medical schools in their country. The executive committee of Medical Council of India (MCI) appointed one of the members as official representative of India in the IAOMC Board of Trustees. Although, the Federal government of the United States does not accredit medical schools, but it recognizes private accrediting organizations, such as the LCME, for the purpose of granting Student loans in the United States. However, State governments of the United States recognize accreditors for licensure purposes.

The Federal government of the United States recognizes Board of Regents of the University of the State of New York as an accreditor. The New York State Regents has chartered IAOMC as an international medical school accrediting organization. New York Constitution has created what is in effect a fourth branch of government, consigning education to the New York State Board of Regents.

IAOMC has not only adopted international standards, but has also established parameters of distance/computer-based learning, and has assembled an international panel of site visitors.

Although, IAOMC has not accredited any single medical school, but nowhere in the world is there such a dedication to openness and transparency in accreditation that IAOMC provides. The information that IAOMC provides on the web site's international data bank is unequivocal.

== Special consultant to the UN on medical education and practice ==
Official delegate badge for Syed Ziaur Rahman

IAOMC is appointed as special consultant to the United Nations on medical education and practice.

The UN held a 63rd Annual DPI/NGO Conference on Advance Global Health: Achieve the MDGs in Melbourne, Australia during August 30, 2010 – September 1, 2010. The goal was to plan a roadmap for worldwide development to improve health particularly in relation to MDGs. Being a voting participant, IAOMC was represented in the Conference by Syed Ziaur Rahman.
