= Adverse event =

Any event, symptom, or disease occurring during a medical treatment

In pharmaceuticals, an adverse event (AE) is any unexpected or harmful medical occurrence that happens to a patient during medical treatment or a clinical trial. Unlike direct side effects, an adverse event does not necessarily mean the medication directly caused the problem. These events can include any unfavorable symptoms, signs, or medical conditions that appear during medical treatment, regardless of whether they are definitively linked to the specific medication being studied.

AEs in patients participating in clinical trials must be reported to the study sponsor and if required could be reported to the local ethics committee. Adverse events categorized as "serious" (results in death, illness requiring hospitalization, events deemed life-threatening, results in persistent or significant incapacity, a congenital anomaly or medically important condition) must be reported to the regulatory authorities immediately, whereas non-serious adverse events are merely documented in the annual summary sent to the regulatory authority.

The sponsor collects AE reports from the local researchers, and notifies all participating sites of the AEs at the other sites, as well as both the local investigators' and the sponsors' judgment of the seriousness of the AEs. This process allows the sponsor and all the local investigators access to a set of data that might suggest potential problems with the study treatment while the study is still ongoing.

== Types of adverse events ==
All clinical trials have the potential to produce AEs. AEs are classified as serious or non-serious; expected or unexpected; and study-related, possibly study-related, or not study-related.

In the normal treatment of a person, an adverse event can be declared when a medication being taken or a medical device used is suspected of causing injury.

In Australia, adverse event refers generically to medical errors of all kinds, surgical, medical or nursing related. The most recent available official study (1995) indicated 18,000 deaths per year are a result of hospital care. The Medical Error Action Group is lobbying for legislation to improve the reporting of AEs and through quality control, minimize the needless deaths.

== Reporting of adverse events ==
Researchers participating in a clinical trial must report all adverse events to the drug regulatory authority of the respective country where the drug or device is to be registered [e.g. Food and Drug Administration (FDA) if it is US]. Serious AEs must be reported immediately; minor AEs are 'bundled' by the sponsor and submitted later.

The type of method used to elicit AEs reported by individuals for evidence on likely adverse drug reactions (ADRs) influences the extent and nature of data. A 2018 review conducted found that some participants in clinical drug trials were asked simple open questions (i.e. 'how are you feeling?'), while in other trials, participants were given lengthy questionnaires about physical symptoms (i.e. 'do you experience muscle soreness or headaches?'. A 2022 review on adverse events in Human challenge trials found that reporting improved over time, but remains non-standardized in ways that make comparisons difficult.

As there is a lack of consensus on how AEs should be assessed, there is a concern that the kinds of questions and the phrasing of questions may lead to measurement error and impede comparisons between studies and pooled analysis. However, Allen et al. concluded that the impact of the AE detected by different methods is unclear.

== Grades of AE ==
Clinical trial results often report the number of grade 3 and grade 4 adverse events. Grades are defined:

- Grade 1 Mild AE
- Grade 2 Moderate AE
- Grade 3 Severe AE
- Grade 4 Life-threatening or disabling AE
- Grade 5 Death related to AE

== Databases of adverse events ==
=== Medical devices ===
The FDA provides a database for reporting of adverse medical device events called the Manufacturer and User Facility Device Experience Database (MAUDE). The data consist of voluntary reports since June 1993, user facility reports since 1991, distributor reports since 1993, and manufacturer reports since August 1996, and is open for public view. Two private companies also provide access to analyzed adverse event information: Clarimed provides adverse event information for medical devices and AdverseEvents provides adverse event data for drugs.

MAUDE is incomplete. KFF Health News of the Kaiser Family Foundation reported discovering a secret set of least 1.1 million adverse events hidden in a database not known to professionals familiar MAUDE. Some device AEs reported to FDA can only be found in MDR Data Files of the Device Experience Network (DEN) or in Alternative Summary Report (ASR) data received by the FDA.

== See also ==
- Clinical trial
- Complication (medicine)
- Good clinical practice (GCP)
- Data monitoring committees
- Serious adverse event
- Adverse effect
- Adverse drug reaction
- Adverse vaccine event
- Adverse outcome pathway
- Antibody-dependent enhancement
- Pharmacovigilance
- EudraVigilance (European Union AE reporting and evaluating network)
- Clinical Trials Directive (Directive 2001/20/EC by European Union)
- Vaccine-associated enhanced respiratory disease
- Adverse Event Reporting System
- Yellow Card Scheme
