= EudraPharm =

EudraPharm (European Union Drug Regulating Authorities Pharmaceutical Database) was the database of medicinal products authorised in the European Union, and included the information contained in the Summary of Product Characteristics, the patient or user package leaflet and the information shown on the labelling. The EudraPharm database was accessible to the general public and the information thus made available was worded in an appropriate and comprehensible manner. It was decommissioned in 2019.

The EudraPharm database of authorised medicinal products was foreseen in the EU Regulation 726/2004.

EudraPharm contained only details of products that were licensed using the Centralised procedure. Therefore, for human medicines, it was only a new interface for information that was available via the EPARs section at the EMEA.

== See also ==
- European Medicines Agency
- EUDRANET
- EudraCT
- EudraGMP
- EudraVigilance
