= STS School =

Syedna Tahir Saifuddin
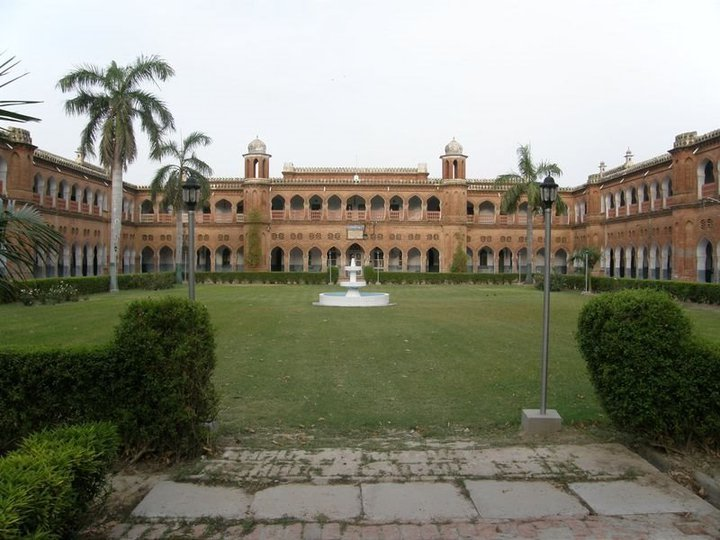
- Secondary Section Building, Minto Circle
- AMU Road, Aligarh; India

Information
- Other name: STS School
- Former names: Muhammadan Anglo-Oriental Collegiate School; Minto Circle
- Type: Government
- Motto: Enter to learn, Depart to serve
- Established: 1875; 151 years ago
- Founder: Syed Ahmad Khan
- Principal: Faisal Nafis
- Grades: K–12
- Campus type: Residential and Non-Residential
- Affiliation: AMU
- Website: amu.ac.in/schools/s-t-s-school/home-page

Syedna Tahir Saifuddin School, better known by its initials STS School, and by its former name Minto Circle, is a K–12 semi-residential high school under Aligarh Muslim University at Aligarh, Uttar Pradesh, India. Established by Sir Syed Ahmad Khan as Muhammadan Anglo-Oriental Collegiate School in 1875, it later evolved as Aligarh Muslim University and is one of the five senior secondary schools run by the university.

The school aims primarily at the education of the Muslim community. Admission, however, is open to children of all communities without distinction of caste and creed. The school has an all-India and all-denominational membership. There is provision for nearly three hundred students to reside in the hostels within the campus. The total strength of the school is around two thousand students.

Henry George Impey Siddons was the first head master of this school.

The current principal is Mr. Faisal Nafis.

== History ==
Minto Circle was founded in 1875 by the educationist and social reformer Sir Syed Ahmad Khan. The foundation stone was laid by an associate of Sir Syed, Maulvi Sami Ullah Khan, Secretary of the College Fund Committee, on 24 May 1875. Its original name was the "Muhammadan Anglo Oriental Collegiate School". The school grew into Muhammadan Anglo-Oriental College in 1877 which in 1920 became the Aligarh Muslim University by an act of the Central Legislature. The school bore the name, Muslim University High School, but became popular as Minto Circle after the then Viceroy of India, Gilbert Elliot-Murray-Kynynmound, 4th Earl of Minto (1845–1914), who funded the construction for its new buildings. In 1966, the school was named after the then Chancellor Syedna Taher Saifuddin, and henceforth known as STS School.

== Schooling ==
In the beginning the school was in two sections with the primary section at Zahoor Ward (presently the Arabic Department) and the building of Old Guest House. After passing class IV, the students were promoted to its senior section in Minto Circle.

The school has a library, playing ground for outdoor games, facilities for playing volleyball, basketball, a common room, and Computer Laboratory.

== Notable alumni ==
- Ayub Khan – President of Pakistan
- Ahmad Ali – poet, critic, novelist
- Mansoor Ali Khan Pataudi – Nawab of Pataudi
- Javed Akhtar – Bollywood script writer and lyricist
- Kulbhushan Kharbanda – film actor
- Lala Amarnath – Independent India's first Test captain
- Nawab Liaquat Ali Khan – former Prime Minister of Pakistan
- Mohammad Hamid Ansari – former vice-Chancellor of Aligarh Muslim University and former vice-president of India
- Naseeruddin Shah – Bollywood actor
- Akhlaqur Rahman Kidwai – Padma Vibhushan Awardee, MP Rajya Sabha, Former governor of the states of Bihar, West Bengal, and Haryana.
- Irfan Habib – Indian Historian
- Augustine George Masih - Judge of The Supreme court of India
- Raja Rao – Indian English novelist
- Talat Mahmood – Bollywood playback singer and actor
- Saeed Jaffrey – Bollywood actor
- Syed Ziaur Rahman – medical pharmacologist
- Zafar Iqbal – former Indian hockey captain
- Murad (actor) – Bollywood actor
