= Serious adverse event =

Negative medical occurrence during a human drug trial

In drug development, serious adverse event (SAE) is defined as any untoward medical occurrence during a human drug trial that at any dose

1. Results in death
2. Is life-threatening
3. Results in hospitalization or prolongs existing hospitalization
4. Results in persistent or significant disability or incapacity
5. May have caused a congenital anomaly or birth defect
6. Requires intervention to prevent permanent impairment or damage

Here, "life-threatening" means that the patient was at risk of death at the time of the event; it does not apply to an event that hypothetically might have caused death if it were more severe. Adverse events are more broadly defined by international regulation as "Any untoward medical occurrence in a patient or clinical investigation subject administered a pharmaceutical product and which does not necessarily have to have a causal relationship with this treatment".

== Research ==
Investigators in human clinical trials are obligated to report these events in clinical study reports. Research suggests that these events are often inadequately reported in publicly available reports. Because of the lack of these data and uncertainty about methods for synthesising them, individuals conducting systematic reviews and meta-analyses of therapeutic interventions often unknowingly overemphasise health benefit. To balance the overemphasis on benefit, scholars have called for more complete reporting of harm from clinical trials.

== Related terms ==
Serious adverse reactions are serious adverse events judged to be related to drug therapy. A SUSAR (suspected unexpected serious adverse reaction) should be reported to a drug regulatory authority under an investigational license by using the CIOMS form (or in some countries an equivalent form). "Unexpected" means that for an authorised (approved) medicinal product that the event is not described in the product's labeling, or in the case of an investigational (yet to be approved or disapproved) product that the event is not listed in the Investigator's Brochure. That is, the AE is unexpected for the drug or device.

An adverse effect is an adverse event which is believed to be caused by a health intervention.

== See also ==
- Adverse event, including mild/minor
- Clinical trial
- Good clinical practice (GCP)
- Data Monitoring Committees
- Pharmacovigilance
- EudraVigilance (European Union)
- Directive 2001/20/EC (European Union)
- TGN1412, a drug that had SAEs in a clinical trial
- BIA 10-2474, a drug that had SAEs, including a fatality, in a clinical trial
