= European Medicines Agency =

Agency of the European Union

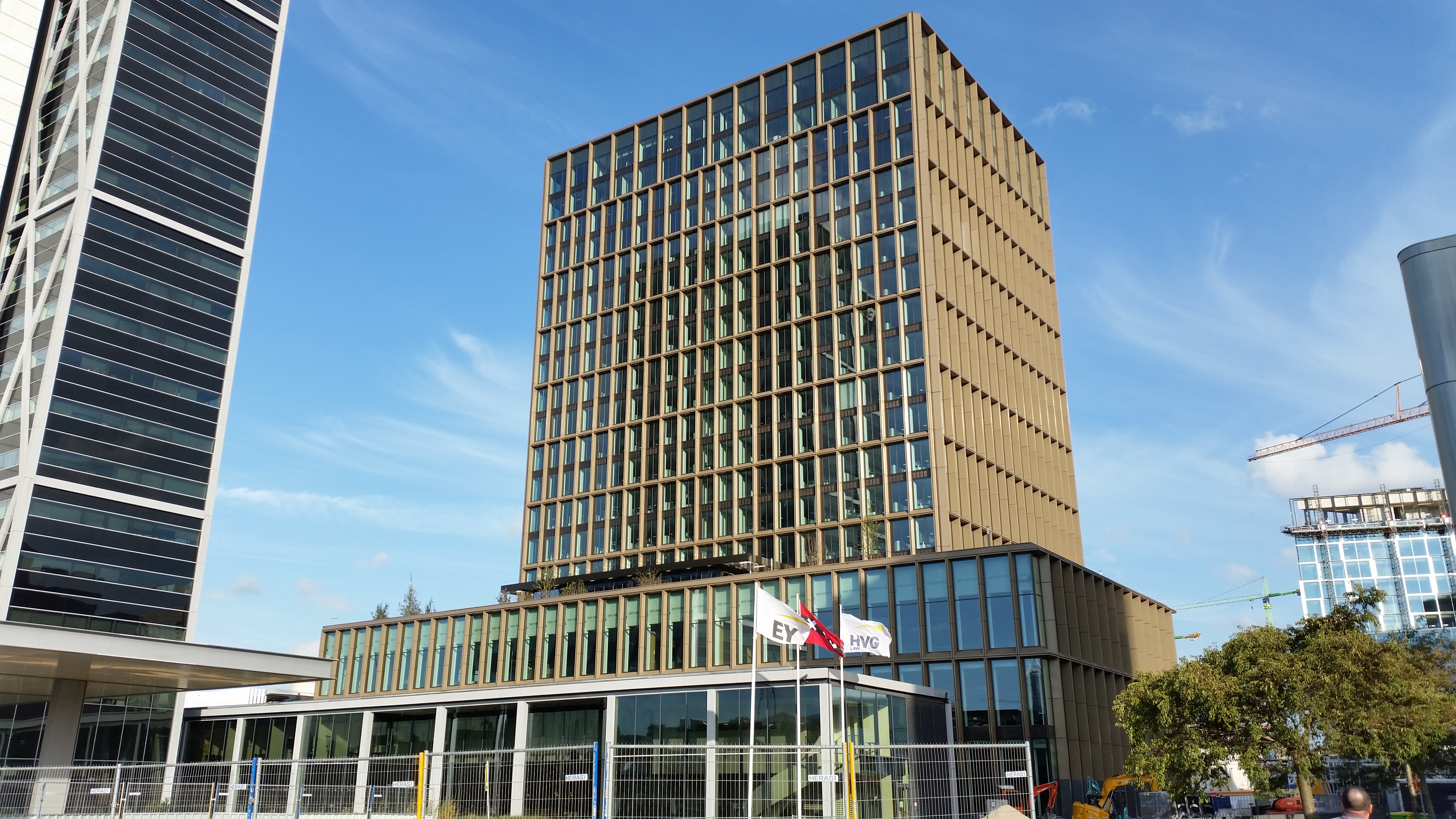
- EMA headquarters in Amsterdam

Agency overview
- Formed: 1 January 1995; 31 years ago
- Jurisdiction: European Union
- Headquarters: Amsterdam, Netherlands
- Motto: Science. Medicines. Health.
- Employees: 897
- Annual budget: €478.4 million (2024)
- Agency executives: Emer Cooke, Executive Director; Christa Wirthumer-Hoche, Chairperson
- Key document: Regulation (EC) No. 726/2004
- Website: ema.europa.eu

Map
- European Medicines Agency (European Union)

The European Medicines Agency (EMA) is an agency of the European Union (EU) in charge of the evaluation and supervision of pharmaceutical products. Prior to 2004, it was known as the European Agency for the Evaluation of Medicinal Products (EAEMP) or European Medicines Evaluation Agency (EMEA).

The EMA was set up in 1995, with funding from the European Union and the pharmaceutical industry, as well as indirect subsidy from member states, its stated intention to harmonise (but not replace) the work of existing national medicine regulatory bodies. The hope was that this plan would not only reduce the €350 million annual cost drug companies incurred by having to win separate approvals from each member state but also that it would eliminate the protectionist tendencies of sovereign states unwilling to approve new drugs that might compete with those already produced by domestic drug companies.

The EMA was founded after more than seven years of negotiations among EU governments and replaced the Committee for Proprietary Medicinal Products and the Committee for Veterinary Medicinal Products, though both of these were reborn as the core scientific advisory committees. The agency was located in London prior to the United Kingdom's vote for withdrawal from the European Union, relocating to Amsterdam in March 2019.

== Operations ==
The European Medicines Agency (EMA) operates as a decentralised scientific agency (as opposed to a regulatory authority) of the European Union (EU) and its main responsibility is the protection and promotion of public and animal health, through the evaluation and supervision of medicines for human and veterinary use. More specifically, it coordinates the evaluation and monitoring of centrally authorised products and national referrals, develops technical guidance and provides scientific advice to sponsors. Its scope of operations is medicinal products for human and veterinary use including biologics and advanced therapies, and herbal medicinal products. The agency is composed of the Secretariat (ca. 600 staff), a management board, seven scientific committees (human, veterinary and herbal medicinal products, orphan drugs, paediatrics, advanced therapies and pharmacovigilance risk assessment) and a number of scientific working parties.

The Secretariat is organised into five units: Directorate, Human Medicines Development and Evaluation, Patient Health Protection, Veterinary Medicines and Product Data Management, Information and Communications Technology and Administration. The management board provides administrative oversight to the Agency: including approval of budgets and plans, and selection of executive director. The Board includes one representative of each of the 27 Member States, two representatives of the European Commission, two representatives of the European Parliament, two representatives of patients' organisations, one representative of doctors' organisations and one representative of veterinarians' organisations. The Agency decentralises its scientific assessment of medicines by working through a network of about 4500 experts throughout the EU. The EMA draws on resources of over 40 National Competent Authorities (NCAs) of EU Member states.

The EMA additionally engages with international agencies and non-governmental organizations on areas of mutual interest, such as its participation on the Coalition for Epidemic Preparedness Innovations' Joint Coordination Group. It is also a benefactor of Health Level Seven International, a member of the International Council for Harmonisation of Technical Requirements for Pharmaceuticals for Human Use and the International Pharmaceutical Regulators Programme (IPRP), and a partner of the Society for Immunotherapy of Cancer and Vaccine Confidence Project.

=== Committees ===
==== Medicinal products for human use ====
A single evaluation is carried out through the Committee for Medicinal Products for Human Use (CHMP). If the Committee concludes that the quality, safety and efficacy of the medicinal product is sufficiently proven, it adopts a positive opinion. This is sent to the European Commission to be transformed into a marketing authorisation valid for the whole of the EU. A special type of approval is the paediatric-use marketing authorisation (PUMA), which can be granted for medical products intended exclusively for paediatric use.

The CHMP is obliged by the regulation to reach decisions within 210 days, though the clock is stopped if it is necessary to ask the applicant for clarification or further supporting data.

The review process of the European Medicines Agency regarding medical issues has been criticized for its lack of transparency. In a rebuttal of an EMS review that included her work, Louise Brinth, a Danish physician, noted that "experts" reviewing data remain unnamed and seem to be bound to secrecy. Minutes are not released and diverging opinions are not reported suggesting that all the "experts" are of the same opinion. In her view the process is unscientific and undemocratic.

==== Medicinal products for veterinary use ====
The Committee for Medicinal Products for Veterinary Use (CVMP) operates in analogy to the CHMP as described above.

==== Orphan medicinal products ====
The Committee on Orphan Medicinal Products (COMP) administers the granting of orphan drug status since 2000. Companies intending to develop medicinal products for the diagnosis, prevention or treatment of life-threatening or very serious conditions that affect not more than five in 10,000 persons in the European Union can apply for 'orphan medicinal product designation'. The COMP evaluates the application and makes a recommendation for the designation which is then granted by the European Commission.

==== Herbal medicinal products ====
The Committee on Herbal Medicinal Products (HMPC) assists the harmonisation of procedures and provisions concerning herbal medicinal products laid down in EU Member States, and further integrating herbal medicinal products in the European regulatory framework since 2004.

==== Paediatrics ====
The Paediatric Committee (PDCO) deals with the implementation of the paediatric legislation in Europe Regulation (EC) No 1901/2006 since 2007. Under this legislation, all applications for marketing authorisation of new medicinal products, or variations to existing authorisations, have to either include data from paediatric studies previously agreed with the PDCO, or obtain a PDCO waiver or a deferral of these studies.

==== Advanced therapies ====
The Committee for Advanced Therapies (CAT) was established in accordance with Regulation (EC) No 1394/2007 on advanced-therapy medicinal products (ATMPs) such as gene therapy, somatic cell therapy and tissue engineered products. It assesses the quality, safety and efficacy of ATMPs, and follows scientific developments in the field.

==== Pharmacovigilance risk assessment ====
A seventh committee, the Pharmacovigilance Risk Assessment Committee (PRAC) has come into function in 2012 with the implementation of the new EU pharmacovigilance legislation (Directive 2010/84/EU).

=== Other activities ===
The Agency carries out a number of activities, including:

- Pharmacovigilance: The Agency constantly monitors the safety of medicines through a pharmacovigilance network and EudraVigilance, so that it can take appropriate actions if adverse drug reaction reports suggest that the benefit-risk balance of a medicine has changed since it was authorised.
- Referrals: The Agency coordinates arbitration procedures relating to medicinal products that are approved or under consideration by Member States in non-centralized authorisation procedures.
- Scientific Advice: Companies wishing to receive scientific advice from the CHMP or CVMP on the appropriate tests and studies to carry out in the development of a medicinal products can request it prior to or during the development program.
- Telematics projects: The Agency is responsible for implementing a central set of pan-European systems and databases such as EudraVigilance, EudraCT and EudraPharm.

=== Centralised marketing authorisations ===
The centralised procedure allows companies to submit a single application to the agency to obtain from the European Commission a centralised (or "community") marketing authorisation (MA) valid in all European Union member states and in Iceland, Liechtenstein and Norway. The centralised procedure is compulsory for all medicines derived from biotechnology and other high-tech processes, as well as for human medicines for the treatment of HIV/AIDS, cancer, diabetes, neurodegenerative diseases, auto-immune and other immune dysfunctions, and viral diseases, and for veterinary medicines for use for growth or yield enhancers. It is also compulsory for advanced-therapy medicines such as gene-therapy, somatic cell-therapy or tissue-engineered medicines and for orphan medicines (for rare diseases). The centralised procedure is also open to products that bring a significant therapeutic, scientific or technical innovation, or is in any other respect in the interest of patient or animal health. As a result, the majority of genuinely novel medicines are authorised through the EMA.

For products eligible for or requiring centralised approval, a company submits an application for a marketing authorisation to the EMA.

== History ==
=== 1995–2004: Inception ===
The EMA was set up in 1995, with funding from the European Union and the pharmaceutical industry, as well as indirect subsidy from member states, its stated intention to harmonise (but not replace) the work of existing national medicine regulatory bodies. The hope was that this plan would not only reduce the €350 million annual cost drug companies incurred by having to win separate approvals from each member state but also that it would eliminate the protectionist tendencies of sovereign states unwilling to approve new drugs that might compete with those already produced by domestic drug companies.

The EMA was founded after more than seven years of negotiations among EU governments and replaced the Committee for Proprietary Medicinal Products and the Committee for Veterinary Medicinal Products, though both of these were reborn as the core scientific advisory committees. The agency was located in London prior to the United Kingdom's vote for withdrawal from the European Union, relocating to Amsterdam in March 2019.

=== 2004: Renaming ===
Prior to 2004, it was known as the European Agency for the Evaluation of Medicinal Products or European Medicines Evaluation Agency (EMEA).

The EMA contributed to the Global Vaccine Action Plan developed by the Decade of Vaccines Collaboration, endorsed by the 194 Member States of the World Health Assembly in May 2012, and published on the World Health Organization's website in February 2013.

=== 2019: Relocation ===
As a result of the 2016 decision of the United Kingdom to leave the European Union ("Brexit"), the EMA had to find a new location within the EU for its headquarters. The decision was made by European Commission, as laid out in EU law. EU ministers met to vote on their preferred successor. The EU's Health Commissioner Vytenis Andriukaitis said that the preferred choice would be a location where an "easy set up and guarantee of smooth operations" would be available. All the remaining EU member states except for the Baltic States and Luxembourg submitted proposals to host the agency.

It had also been speculated that the Strasbourg-based seat of the European Parliament could be moved to Brussels, if EMA headquarters were moved to Strasbourg in exchange. Others speculated on the merits of Amsterdam, well before the final decision was made.

The relocation decision was made on 20 November 2017, at a EU General Affairs Council meeting, after three voting rounds and finally drawing of lots. After the first round of voting, Milan (25 votes), Amsterdam (20 votes) and Copenhagen (20 votes) were the only contenders left. After the second voting round, two cities were left: Milan (twelve votes) and Amsterdam (nine votes). These two cities tied in the subsequent vote (thirteen votes each), after which a drawing of lots identified Amsterdam as the host city of EMA.

EMA staff left its London premises in March 2019 to relocate to a temporary building in Amsterdam, and by January 2020 the relocation to the permanent building in Amsterdam's Zuidas district was finalised. The EMA sought, unsuccessfully, to argue that their lease on the London premises could be terminated on the legal ground of "frustration", because of the legal obligation of the EU to locate the agency within EU territory. The High Court ruled that the doctrine of frustration did not apply in the circumstances and the EMA was left in possession of a lease with much of its initial 25-year term still to run.

=== 2020: COVID-19 ===
The EMA played a significant role in the response to the COVID-19 pandemic in the European Union, seeking to expedite the development and approval of COVID-19 vaccines and treatments.

It participated in the Accelerating COVID-19 Therapeutic Interventions and Vaccines (ACTIV) public–private partnership hosted by the Foundation for the National Institutes of Health, collaborating with international government agencies and corporations to coordinate a research strategy for prioritizing and speeding up development of COVID-19 vaccines and pharmaceutical products.

While in the process of evaluating the Pfizer–BioNTech COVID-19 vaccine in December 2020, the EMA suffered a cyberattack, resulting in the leak of classified regulatory documents to journalists, academics and the public via the dark web. The documents revealed internal concerns about low production quality in the mRNA vaccine candidate, and regulators' efforts to have Pfizer and BioNTech rectify these deficiencies. The EMA ultimately authorized the vaccine on 21 December 2020, satisfied that the product quality was "sufficiently consistent and acceptable".

== Comparison with other medical regulatory agencies ==
As of 2016, the EMA was roughly parallel to the drug part of the U.S. Food and Drug Administration (FDA), but without centralisation. The timetable for product approval via the EMA's centralised procedure of 210 days compares well with the average of 500 days taken by the FDA in 2008 to evaluate a product.

== See also ==
- Ethics Committee
- EudraCT
- EudraGMP
- EudraLex
- EUDRANET
- EudraPharm
- EudraVigilance
- European and Developing Countries Clinical Trials Partnership
- European Centre for Disease Prevention and Control (ECDC)
- European Clinical Research Infrastructures Network
- European Federation of Pharmaceutical Industries and Associations
- European Forum for Good Clinical Practice (EFGCP)
- ICH
- Inverse benefit law
- Medicines and Healthcare products Regulatory Agency (MHRA, UK)
- Qualified person
- Regulation of therapeutic goods
- Supplementary protection certificate (SPC)
