= Fimea =

Finnish government agency

Finnish Medicines Agency
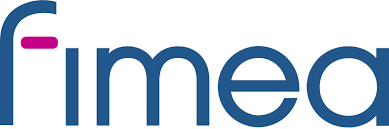
- Logo of the agency
- Abbreviation: Fimea
- Formation: 2009
- Headquarters: Hallituskatu 12-14, Kuopio, Finland
- Leader: Eija Pelkonen
- Budget: 4,8 milj. € (2023)
- Staff: 330 (2023)

The Finnish Medicines Agency (Fimea; Swedish: Säkerhets- och utvecklingscentret för läkemedelsområdet) is a central agency under the Ministry of Social Affairs and Health that regulates medicines, medical devices, blood and tissue products, biobanks, and develops the pharmaceutical industry. Fimea was established in 2009, succeeding the National Agency for Medicines. Its predecessor, the National Agency for Medicines, had been operational since 1994.

== Responsibilities ==
Fimea's tasks and objectives are based on national and EU legislation, government programs, the strategy of the Ministry of Social Affairs and Health, and performance and resource management. The agency's task areas include pharmaceutical licensing and supervision tasks, research and development, and the production and dissemination of pharmaceutical information to improve the effectiveness of pharmaceutical care and treatment. Fimea is part of the European medicines regulatory network and is oriented towards international cooperation. Fimea acts as the licensing and supervisory authority for human or veterinary medicines, blood and tissue products, and pharmaceutical operators. Fimea also monitors the compliance of medical devices and pharmaceutical operators in Finland. Fimea is also responsible for coordinating national pharmaceutical development, research tasks, and evaluating pharmaceutical treatments. Fimea collects and evaluates clinical information on pharmaceutical treatments and develops treatment practices through education and information dissemination.

Fimea's operations are funded by revenue from fee-based activities and state appropriations.

== Operations ==
Eija Pelkonen serves as Fimea's Director-General. Fimea's organizational structure was reformed in 2022 and consists of three functional areas: Marketing Authorizations, Supervision and Availability, and Safety and Effectiveness. In addition, the functional areas are supported by Shared Services, Communication Services, and Information and Development Services. Fimea's main office is located in Kuopio. Fimea also has offices in Helsinki, Turku, Tampere, and Oulu.
