= EUDRANET =

EUDRANET, the European Telecommunication Network in Pharmaceuticals (European Union Drug Regulating Authorities Network), is an IT platform to facilitate the exchange of information between regulatory partners and industry during submission and evaluation of applications. The aim of EUDRANET is to provide appropriate secure services for inter-Administration data interchange and for exchanges between Administrations and industry. EUDRANET is based on the TESTA backbone infrastructure provided by the IDA Programme.

The processes which EUDRANET supports include:

- The submission and evaluation of marketing authorisation applications by pharmaceutical companies;
- The pharmacovigilance of products on the market to ensure the maintenance of high standards of quality as well as adhering to European national and regional regulations;
- The dissemination of relevant information to industry, scientific experts and regulators.

== See also ==
- eHealth
- EudraCT
- EudraGMP
- EudraPharm
- EudraVigilance
- European Medicines Agency
- Qualified Person
