= EudraVigilance =

EudraVigilance (European Union Drug Regulating Authorities Pharmacovigilance) is the European data processing network and management system for reporting and evaluation of suspected adverse reactions to medicines or devices which have received marketing authorisation or are actively being studied in clinical trials in the European Economic Area (EEA). The European Medicines Agency (EMA) operates the system on behalf of the European Union (EU) medicines regulatory network.

The European EudraVigilance system deals with the:

- Electronic exchange of Individual Case Safety Reports (ICSR, based on the ICH E2B specifications):
  - EudraVigilance Clinical Trial Module (EVCTM) for reporting Suspected Unexpected Serious Adverse Reactions (SUSARs).
  - EudraVigilance Post-Authorisation Module (EVPM) for post-authorisation ICSRs.
- Early detection of possible safety signals from marketed drugs for human use.
- Continuous monitoring and evaluation of potential safety issues in relation to reported adverse reactions.
- Decision-making process, based on a broader knowledge of the adverse reaction profile of drugs.

EMA publishes data from EudraVigilance in the European database for suspected adverse drug reaction reports.

The EudraVigilance access policy governs the level of access different stakeholder groups have to adverse drug reactions reports.

== See also ==
- Clinical trial
- Drug development
- EudraCT
- EudraGMP
- EudraLex
- EUDRANET
- EudraPharm
- European Medicines Agency
- International Society of Pharmacovigilance
- Medication
- Pharmacovigilance
- Serious adverse event
- Uppsala Monitoring Centre
- Yellow Card Scheme
