= Safety Pharmacology Society =

- Formation: 2000
- Headquarters: Reston, Virginia
- Official language: English
- Current president: Marie-Luce Rosseels
- Website: Official website

The Safety Pharmacology Society (SPS) is an organization that focuses on safety pharmacology.

== History ==
The Safety Pharmacology Society was incorporated in 2000, at the time when the International Conference on Harmonisation of Technical Requirements for Registration of Pharmaceuticals for Human Use was issuing ICH S7A, a regulatory guidance covering safety pharmacology, and drafting ICH S7B, which is more specific to potential effects of new drugs on cardiac repolarization.

The Safety Pharmacology Society organizes an annual meeting in the fall, comprising invited speakers and posters. This meeting has alternated between North America and Europe.
