= Lifestyle drug =

Medication which treats non–life-threatening and non-painful conditions

Lifestyle drug is an imprecise term commonly applied to medications which treat non–life-threatening and non-painful conditions such as baldness, wrinkles, erectile dysfunction, or acne, which the speaker perceives as either not medical problems at all or as minor medical conditions relative to others. It is sometimes intended as a pejorative, bearing the implication that the scarce medical research resources allocated to develop such drugs were spent frivolously when they could have been better spent researching cures for more serious medical conditions. Proponents, however, point out that improving the patient's subjective quality of life has always been a primary concern of medicine, and argue that these drugs are doing just that. It finds broad use in both media and scholarly journals.

== Concept and impact on society ==
There is direct impact of lifestyle drugs on society, particularly in the developing world. Implications associated with labeling of indications and products sales of these lifestyle drugs may be varied. Drugs can, over time, switch from 'lifestyle' to 'mainstream' use.

== Bioethics and medical policy debate ==
Though no precise widely accepted definition or criteria are associated with the term, there is much debate within the fields of pharmacology and bioethics around the propriety of developing such drugs, particularly after the commercial debut of Viagra.

The German government's health insurance scheme has denied insurance coverage for some Lifestyle-Medikament ("lifestyle drugs") which they deem spurious.

Critics of pharmaceutical firms claim that pharmaceutical firms actively medicalize; that is, they invent novel disorders and diseases which were not recognized as such before their "cures" could be profitably marketed, in effect pathologizing what were widely regarded as normal conditions of human existence. The consequences are said to include generally greater worries about health, misallocation of limited medical research resources to comparatively minor conditions while many serious diseases remain uncured, and needless health care expenditure. This medicalization of some element of human condition has significance, in principle, as a matter for political discourse or dialogue in civil society concerning values or morals.

Social critics also question the propriety of devoting huge research budgets towards creating these drugs when far more dangerous diseases like cancer and AIDS remain uncured. It is sometimes claimed that lifestyle drugs amount to little more than medically sanctioned recreational drug use.

== Examples of lifestyle drugs ==
- Modafinil (when used off-label or for shift-work); Modafinil is indicated for the treatment shift-work sleep disorder, sometimes dubbed a lifestyle condition. In this aspect, modafinil is already recognized as a lifestyle drug by the FDA. Modafinil's off-label use for increasing productivity is another example of its use as a lifestyle drug. Modafinil has been used to support lifestyles requiring long and irregular working hours (such as in shift-work), frequent memory recall throughout the day (amongst students and academics), and unfatigued decision making capabilities (such as amongst U.S. air force pilots, where modafinil is an approved "go pill"). Compared to other productivity drugs, users of modafinil for this purpose more often report possessing prescriptions for modafinil.
- Finasteride (when used to treat balding); The use of DHT blocking medications like finasteride for the treatment of balding without the intent to treat dangerous pathologies can be considered lifestyle-enhancing use of the medication.
- Minoxidil; The use of minoxidil and other topical vasodilating medications for the treatment of balding without the intent to treat dangerous pathologies can be considered lifestyle-enhancing use of the medication.
