= List of European Union directives =

This list of European Union Directives is ordered by theme to follow EU law. For a date based list, see the Category:European Union directives by number.

From 1 January 1992 to 31 December 2014, numbers assigned by the General Secretariat of the Council followed adoption, for instance: Directive 2010/75/EU. Since 2015, acts have been numbered following the pattern (domain) YYYY/N, for instance "Regulation (EU) 2016/1627" with

- domain being "EU" for the European Union, "Euratom" for the European Atomic Energy Community, "EU, Euratom" for the European Union and the European Atomic Energy Community, "CFSP" for the Common Foreign and Security Policy
- year being the 4 digit year
- the sequential number.

Some older directives had an ordinal number in their name, for instance: "First Council Directive 73/239/EEC".

== Free movement and trade ==
=== Goods ===
- Commission Directive 66/683/EEC of 7 November 1966 eliminating all differences between the treatment of national products and that of products which, under Articles 9 and 10 of the Treaty, must be admitted for free movement, as regards laws, regulations or administrative provisions prohibiting the use of the said products and prescribing the use of national products or making such use subject to profitability.

== Social and market regulation ==
=== Business protection ===
- Council Directive 84/850/EEC concerning misleading and comparative advertising (1984), "substantially amended several times", and replaced in 2006 by:
- Directive 2006/114/EC of the European Parliament and of the Council concerning misleading and comparative advertising. The aim of this directive is to protect traders against misleading advertising and its unfair consequences.

=== Consumer protection ===
- Directive 85/374/EEC: Product liability directive: establishes the principle of producer liability without fault applicable to European producers, such that "where a defective product causes damage to a consumer, the producer may be liable even without negligence or fault on their part".
- Directive 98/27/EC on injunctions for the protection of consumers' interests, repealed by
  - Directive 2009/22/EC of the European Parliament and of the Council of 23 April 2009 on injunctions for the protection of consumers' interests.
- Directive on alternative consumer dispute resolution, Directive 2013/11/ΕU, issued on 21 May 2013.

=== Company law and finance ===
- Seventh Directive: Consolidated accounts of companies with limited liability (Directive 83/349/EEC of 29/6/83).
- Eighth Directive: Qualifications of persons responsible for carrying out the statutory audits of accounting documents (Official Journal L126 of 12.5.1984, on EUR-Lex).
  - Communication COM(2003)286, related to the Eighth Directive, aimed at reinforcing statutory audit in the European Union – not published in the Official Journal. Objective: reinforcing public oversight of the audit profession; imposing the International Standards on Auditing (ISAs) for statutory audits in the European Union as of 2005; systems of disciplinary sanctions; establishing the transparency of audit firms; as regards corporate governance, reinforcing audit committees and internal control.
- Settlement Finality Directive, 1998
- Audit directive 2006/43/EC of the European Parliament and of the Council of 17 May 2006 on statutory audits of annual accounts and consolidated accounts, amending Council Directives 78/660/EEC and 83/349/EEC and repealing Council Directive 84/253/EEC. Entered into force on 29 June 2006.
- Directive 2009/49/EC of the European Parliament and of the Council amending Council Directives 78/660/EEC and 83/349/EEC as regards certain disclosure requirements for medium-sized companies and the obligation to draw up consolidated accounts, 18 June 2009, intended to reduce the administrative burdens placed on businesses. Implementation was required by Member States by 1 January 2011.
- A proposal intended to simplify the accounting directives was put forward by the European Commission on 25 October 2011.
- Non-financial reporting – Directive 2013/34/EU, concerning disclosure of non-financial and diversity information by certain large undertakings and groups, also known as NFRD, was amended by Directive 2014/95/EU of the European Parliament and of the Council of 22 October 2014. The directives provide for "a certain minimum legal requirement as regards the extent of the information that should be made available to the public and authorities by undertakings across the Union" and require "undertakings subject to this Directive" to give "a fair and comprehensive view of their policies, outcomes, and risks". Undertakings subject to the Directive are those with an average of over 500 employees during the reporting year. The directive is supported by non-binding guidelines on reporting methodology published by the European Commission on 26 June 2017. There are about 2000 companies (excluding exempted subsidiaries) affected by the requirements of the directive. On 21 April 2021, the Commission adopted a proposal for a new directive to amend the existing reporting requirements, on which provisional agreement between the European Council and the European Parliament was reached on 21 June 2022. The proposal:
  - extends the duty to all large companies and all companies listed on a regulated market (except listed micro-enterprises)
  - requires the reported information to be audited
  - introduces more detailed reporting requirements and a requirement to use mandatory EU sustainability reporting standards (to be developed)
  - requires businesses to digitally 'tag' the reported information so that it is machine readable.

The proposed standards were to be developed by October 2022.
Another proposed amendment to the 2013 directive was put forward by the Commission in April 2016 concerning disclosure of corporate tax information on a country-by-country basis.

- Alternative Investment Fund Managers Directive (AIFM) for investment funds
- Capital Requirements Directive (CRD) for bank capital
- Markets in Financial Instruments Directive 2004 (MIFIR, MiFID-I, MiFID-II )
- Transparency Directive
- Financial Collateral Directive 2002/47/EC
- Directive 2002/83/EC of the European Parliament and of the Council of 5 November 2002 concerning Life Assurance
- Payment Services Directive
- Undertakings for Collective Investment in Transferable Securities Directive 2009 (UCITS)
- 6th Anti-Money Laundering Directive

=== Insurance ===
- European Union Directive 2009/20/EC was implemented in all 27 member states by January 1, 2012. The directive requires compulsory protection and indemnity (P&I) insurance cover for EU and foreign ships in EU waters and ports. Foreign vessels that do not comply to the directive may be expelled or refused entry into any EU port, although ships may be allowed time to comply before expulsion.
- The Insurance Distribution Directive (IDD, Directive (EU) 2016/97 of 20 January 2016) sets out regulatory requirements for firms designing and selling insurance products. It aims to enhance consumer protection when buying insurance, including general insurance, life insurance and insurance-based investment products (IBIPs) – and to support competition between insurance distributors by creating a level playing field. The directive replaced the previous Insurance Mediation Directive (IMD).

=== Labour law ===
- Council Directive 91/533/EEC on an employer's obligation to inform employees of the conditions applicable to the contract or employment relationship

Anti-discrimination

- Council Directive 97/80/EC, on the burden of proof in cases of discrimination based on sex.
- Council Directive 2000/43/EC of 29 June 2000 implementing the principle of equal treatment between persons irrespective of racial or ethnic origin : also called the "Race Directive" (Directive 2000/43/EC on Anti-discrimination)
- Council Directive 2000/78/EC of 27 November 2000 establishing a general framework for equal treatment in employment and occupation
- Council Directive 2004/113/EC of 13 December 2004 implementing the principle of equal treatment between men and women in the access to and supply of goods and services
- Directive 2006/54/EC of the European Parliament and of the Council of 5 July 2006 on the implementation of the principle of equal opportunities and equal treatment of men and women in matters of employment and occupation (recast)
- Proposal for a Directive on combating violence against women and domestic violence of 8 March 2022

Safety at work

- Equipment and protective systems intended for use in potentially explosive atmospheres (2014/34/EU "ATEX directive")
- Machinery Directive
- Minimum requirements for improving the safety and health protection of workers potentially at risk from explosive atmospheres (99/92/EC "ATEX directive")
- Personal protective equipment directive ("PPE directive")
- Pressure Equipment Directive ("PED") 2014/68/EU (formerly 97/23/EC)
- Airborne noise emitted by household appliances directive
- Noise emission in the environment by equipment for use outdoors directive

=== Competition law and procurement ===
- Council Directive 71/304/EEC of 26 July 1971 concerning the abolition of restrictions on freedom to provide services in respect of public works contracts and on the award of public works contracts to contractors acting through agencies or branches. This directive required Member States by 26 July 1972 to abolish certain restrictions applying to freedom to provide services in the construction sector.
- Coordinating the procurement procedures of entities operating in the water, energy, transport and postal services sectors directive – 2004/17/EC 31 March 2004, replaced by
  - Directive 2014/25/EU of the European Parliament and of the Council of 26 February 2014 on procurement by entities operating in the water, energy, transport and postal services sectors and repealing Directive 2004/17/EC.
- Coordination of procedures for the award of public works contracts, public supply contracts and public service contracts directive – 2004/18/EC 31 March 2004, replaced by
  - Directive 2014/24/EU of the European Parliament and of the Council of 26 February 2014 on public procurement and repealing Directive 2004/18/EC
- Remedies Directives: Directive 89/665/EEC (for the public sector) and Directive 92/13/EEC (for the utilities sector). These directives provided for interim orders preventing signature of a public contract, and require public authorities and utilities to inform all tenderers about the outcome of the tender process. Both were amended by
  - Directive 2007/66/EC – the "amending Remedies Directive", intended to improve "the effectiveness of review procedures concerning the award of public contracts". In summary, the 2007 directive "strengthen[s] the remedies available to candidates and tenderers who feel their rights have been infringed in the award of public contracts, improve[s] the opportunities for unsuccessful tenderers to challenge unlawful awards, and increase[s] the possible penalties on contracting authorities for making such awards". In the case of a contract awarded in serious breach of the rules, it allows a national court to declare the contract "ineffective". A statutory "standstill period" coming between a contract award decision and the actual award of the contract, and the immediate suspension of the right to award a contract where a timely challenge has been submitted, were established by the 2007 directive. Recital 36 of the amending directive ties its objectives to the fundamental rights and principles of the Charter of Fundamental Rights of the European Union, in particular to the right to an effective remedy and to a fair hearing.

=== Environmental law ===
Environmental assessment

- Strategic environmental assessment (Directive 2001/42/EC)
- Environmental impact assessment (Directive 2011/92/EU of the European Parliament and of the Council of 13 December 2011 on the assessment of the effects of certain public and private projects on the environment, amended by Directive 2014/52/EU of 16 April 2014)

Plastics

- Directive 94/62/EC
- Directive (EU) 2015/720 of the European Parliament and of the Council of 29 April 2015 amending Directive 94/62/EC as regards reducing the consumption of lightweight plastic carrier bags
- Directive (EU) 2019/904 of the European Parliament and of the Council of 5 June 2019 on the reduction of the impact of certain plastic products on the environment (the "Single-Use Plastics Directive"), effective from 3 July 2021

Pollution and Waste

- The Directive 76/464/EEC of 4 May 1976 on pollution caused by certain dangerous substances discharged into the aquatic environment of the Community
- Packaging and packaging waste directive, 94/62/EC deals with the problems of packaging waste and the currently permitted heavy metal content in packaging
- Council Directive 96/61/EC of 24 September 1996 concerning integrated pollution prevention and control; replaced by Directive 2008/1/EC (see below)
- Landfill Directive, Council Directive 1999/31/EC of 26 April 1999, amended by Directive (EU) 2018/850 with effect from 5 July 2020
- RoHS Directive 2002/95/EC
- Waste Electrical and Electronic Equipment Directive ("WEEE directive"), Directive 2002/96, revised in 2006, 2009 and 2012, currently Directive 2012/19/EU on waste electrical and electronic equipment
- Battery directive (2006/66/EC in force from 6 September 2006), Directive 2006/66/EC of the European Parliament and of the Council of 6 September 2006 on batteries and accumulators and waste batteries and accumulators and repealing Directive 91/157/EEC. Directive 2006/66/EC was amended by Directive 2013/56/EU of 20 November 2013.
- Integrated Pollution Prevention and Control (Directive 2008/1/EC of the European Parliament and of the Council of 15 January 2008 concerning integrated pollution prevention and control)
- Waste framework directive (Directive 2008/98/EC of the European Parliament and of the Council on Waste)

Environment – Other

- Industrial Emissions Directive
- Floods directive
- Large Combustion Plant Directive (Directive 2001/80/EC of 23 October 2001 on the limitation of emissions of certain pollutants into the air from large combustion plants)
- Noise emission in the environment by equipment for use outdoors (2000/14/EC − ″OND″)
- Implementation of a Scheme for Greenhouse Gas Emission Allowance Trading Directive, amending Council Directive 96/61/EC (Directive 2003/87/EC of 13 October 2003)
- Directive on public access to environmental information: Directive 2003/4/EC of the European Parliament and of the Council of 28 January 2003 on public access to environmental information, which repealed the earlier Council Directive 90/313/EEC
- Air quality (Directive 2008/50/EC)
- Marine Strategy Framework Directive (Council Directive 2008/56/EC)

=== Intellectual property ===
- Patentability of computer-implemented inventions (proposed, then rejected)
- Directive on the legal protection of topographies of semiconductor products (87/54/EEC 16 December 1986)
- Trade Marks Directive (89/104/EEC 21 December 1988)
- Rental and lending rights (92/100/EEC)
- Satellite and Cable Directive (93/83/EEC 27 September 1993)
- Harmonising the term of copyright protection (Copyright Duration Directive) (93/98/EEC 29 October 1993) (replaced by Copyright Term Directive 2006)
- Database Directive (96/9/EC 11 March 1996)
- Patentability of biotechnological inventions (98/44/EC 6 July 1998)
- Legal protection of designs (98/71/EC)
- The Information Society Directive (2001/29/EC 22 May 2001)
- Directive on the re-use of public sector information (2003/98/EC 17 November 2003)
- Enforcement of intellectual property rights (Civil) (2004/48/EC 29 April 2004), also known as the Enforcement Directive
- Enforcement of intellectual property rights (Criminal) (withdrawn)
- Directive on Copyright in the Digital Single Market (2019)
- Computer Programs Directive (1991)
- Conditional Access Directive (1998)
- Copyright Term Directive (2006)
- Electronic Commerce Directive 2000 (2000)
- Resale Rights Directive (2001)

== Public regulation ==
=== Agriculture, forestry and water ===
- Birds Directive (Council Directive 79/409/EEC and 2009/147/EC on the conservation of wild birds)
- Habitats Directive (Council Directive 92/43/EEC of 21 May 1992 on the conservation of natural habitats and of wild fauna and flora)
- Urban Waste Water Directive (Council Directive 91/271/EEC of 21 May 1991 concerning urban waste water collection and treatment)
- Water Framework Directive (Directive 2000/60/EC of the European Parliament and of the Council of 23 October 2000 establishing a framework for Community action in the field of water policy)
- Groundwater Directive (Directive 2006/118/EC of the European Parliament and of the Council of 12 December 2006 on the protection of groundwater against pollution and deterioration)
- Environmental Quality Standards Directive (Directive 2008/105/EC of the European Parliament and of the Council of 16 December 2008 on environmental quality standards in the field of water policy, amending and subsequently repealing Council Directives 82/176/EEC, 83/513/EEC, 84/156/EEC, 84/491/EEC, 86/280/EEC and amending Directive 2000/60/EC of the European Parliament and of the Council)
- Drinking Water Directive 1998 of 3 November 1998

=== Energy ===
- Energy efficiency requirements for ballasts for fluorescent lighting directive
- Energy efficiency requirements for household electric refrigerators, freezers and combinations thereof directive
- Directive on electricity production from renewable energy sources 2001/77/EC (superseded)
- Promotion of cogeneration based on a useful heat demand in the internal energy market (2004/8/EC CHP directive)
- Promotion of the use of biofuels and other renewable fuels for transport
- Renewable energy directive 2009/28/EC
- Internal market in electricity directive 2009/72/EC
- Energy efficiency directive 2012/27/EU

=== Food ===
- Commission Directive 91/71/EEC on the level of sweeteners, flavourings and additives used in foods
- Colours for use in foodstuffs (1994/36/EC 30 June 1994)
- Food supplements directive (2002/46/EC 10 June 2002)

=== Pharmaceuticals ===
- Directive 65/65/EEC1
- Directive 75/318/EEC
- Directive 75/319/EEC
- Directive 93/41/EEC
- Directive 2001/20/EC
- Directive 2001/83/EC
- Directive 2005/28/EC

=== Textiles ===
- Directives 73/44/EC, 96/73/EC and 2008/121/EC applicable in the textile sector were repealed and replaced from 8 May 2012 by Regulation (EU) 1007/2011 on textile fibre names and related labelling and marking of fibre composition of textile products (the "Textile Regulation").

=== Transport ===
Rail transport

- EU Directive 91/440 creation of open access railways ("de-monopolisation of railways"), with modifications forms part of the First Railway Package
- Second Railway Package (2004), a collection of directives concerning open access railway operations, specifically with respect to interoperability and safety
- EU Directive 2008/57/EC, an updated directive that covers the interoperability of both the Trans-European high-speed rail network and the Trans-European conventional rail network
- Interoperability of trans-European conventional rail system directive
- Interoperability of trans-European high-speed rail system directive

Road transport

- Directive 80/1269/EEC – relating to the engine power of motor vehicles
- Directive 96/53/EC - laying down for certain road vehicles circulating within the Community the maximum authorised dimensions in national and international traffic and the maximum authorised weights in international traffic
- Directive 2004/54/EC of the European Parliament and of the Council of 29 April 2004 on minimum safety requirements for tunnels in the Trans-European Road Network
- Directive 2008/96/EC of the European Parliament and of the Council of 19 November 2008 on road infrastructure safety management
- Directive 2009/33/EC – the "Clean Vehicles Directive"
- Directive (EU) 2019/1161, the revised Clean Vehicles Directive, adopted by the European Parliament and the Council in June 2019, and to be transposed into national law by 2 August 2021.

Transport – Other

- Lifts Directive
- Transportable pressure equipment directive

=== Communications and data ===
- Radio equipment and telecommunications terminal equipment and the mutual recognition of their conformity directive (1999/5/EC "R&TTE Directive")
- Radio Equipment Directive (2014/53/EU "RED Directive")
- Access and interconnection Directive 2002/19/EC
- "Authorisation" Directive 2002/20/EC
- "Framework" Directive 2002/21/EC
- Universal service and user's rights Directive 2002/22/EC
- Directive on Privacy and Electronic Communications 2002/58/EC
- Certain legal aspects of information society services, in particular electronic commerce, in the Internal Market directive – 2000/31/EC "Directive on electronic commerce", 8 June 2000
- Infrastructure for Spatial Information in the European Community (INSPIRE) – 2007/2/EC INSPIRE directive 14 March 2007
- General Data Protection Regulation (Regulation 2016/679), superseded the Data Protection Directive (95/46/EC 24 October 1995)
- Directive (EU) 2016/680 of the European Parliament and of the Council of 27 April 2016 on the protection of natural persons with regard to the processing of personal data by competent authorities for the purposes of the prevention, investigation, detection or prosecution of criminal offences or the execution of criminal penalties... on EUR-Lex
- Directive on a Community framework for electronic signatures (1999/93/EC 13 December 1999) on EUR-Lex
- Directive on Privacy and Electronic Communications (2002/58/EC 12 July 2002) on EUR-Lex
- Data Retention Directive (2006/24/EC 15 March 2006)
- Directive 2009/136/EC (25 November 2009) on EUR-Lex, was COD/2007/0248 in the Telecoms Package, amending Directive 2002/22/EC on universal service and users' rights relating to electronic communications networks and services, Directive 2002/58/EC concerning the processing of personal data and the protection of privacy in the electronic communications sector and Regulation (EC) No 2006/2004 on cooperation between national authorities responsible for the enforcement of consumer protection laws.
- Passenger Name Record (PNR) Directive (2016/681 of 27 April 2016) on EUR-Lex
- Database Directive (declared invalid by CJEU)
- Directive on the re-use of public sector information

=== Media ===
- Television Without Frontiers Directive (Council Directive 97/36/EC)

== Taxation ==
- Directive on taxation of savings income in the form of interest payments: Directive 2003/48/EC of 3 June 2003.
- Energy Taxation Directive: Directive 2003/96/EC, which replaced the earlier Directives 92/81/EEC and 92/82/EEC.

== Other ==
- Counterfeit goods regulation (2003)
- Community postal services Directive
- Council Directive 86/653/EEC of 18 December 1986 on the coordination of the laws of the Member States relating to self-employed commercial agents.
- Council Directive 96/82/EC of 9 December 1996 on the control of major-accident hazards involving dangerous substances, also known as the Seveso II Directive.
- Directive on taxation of savings income in the form of interest payments
- Directive 2004/38/EC on the right to move and reside freely
- 96/71/EC Posted Workers Directive on the free movement of workers
- Shareholders Rights Directive, originally adopted in 2007, and amended in June 2017 as the Shareholder Rights Directive II or SRD II.
- Temporary Protection Directive on handling a mass influx of refugees

=== Medical devices ===
- Directive 93/42/EEC (Medical devices directive)
- Active Implantable Medical Devices Directive
- In vitro diagnostic medical devices directive

=== Weights and measures ===
- Metric Directive 80/181/EEC
- Measuring instruments directive
- Non-automatic weighing instruments directive
- e-marking directive

=== Other safety measures ===
- Appliances burning gaseous fuels directive
- Artificial optical radiation directive (2006/25/EC in force from 5 April 2006)
- Cableway installations designed to carry persons directive
- Construction Products Directive
- Dangerous Preparations Directive (1999/45/EC in force from 30 July 2002)
- Efficiency requirements for new hot-water boilers fired with liquid or gaseous fuels directive ("Boilers directive")
- Electromagnetic compatibility directive ("EMC directive")
- Explosives for civil uses directive
- General product safety directive (Directive 2001/95/EC), replaced by Regulation (EU) 2023/988
- Low voltage Directive
- Marine equipment directive
- Recreational Craft Directive
- Registration, Evaluation and Authorisation of Chemicals ("REACH directive")
- Restriction of Hazardous Substances Directive (RoHS) ("RoHS directive")
- Restrictions on marketing and use of certain dangerous substances and preparations directive ("Azocolourants directive")
- Safety of toys directive
- Simple pressure vessel directive
- Tobacco Advertising Directive (IP/02/1788)
- Transportable Pressure Equipment Directive (2010/35/EU in force from 16 June 2010)

== See also ==
- Law of the European Union
- European Union regulation
- EUR-Lex
- EudraLex
