= Good Clinical Practice Directive =

Organization that enforces clinical principle

The Good Clinical Practice Directive (Directive 2005/28/EC of 8 April 2005 of the European Parliament and of the Council) lays down principles and detailed guidelines for good clinical practice as regards conducting clinical trials of medicinal products for human use, as well as the requirements for authorisation of the manufacturing or importation of such products.

The directive deals with the following items:

- Good clinical practice for the design, conduct, recording and reporting of clinical trials:
  - Good Clinical Practice (GCP)
  - The Ethics Committee
  - The sponsors
- Investigator's Brochure
- Manufacturing or import authorisation
  - Exemption for Hospital & Health Centres and Reconstitution
  - Conditions of Holding a Manufacturing Licence
- The Trial master file and archiving
  - Format of Trial Master File
  - Retention of Essential and Medical Records
- Inspectors
- Inspection procedures
- Final provisions

== See also ==
- EudraLex
- Directive 65/65/EEC1
- Directive 75/318/EEC
- Directive 75/319/EEC
- Directive 93/41/EEC
- Directive 2001/20/EC
- Directive 2001/83/EC
- Regulation of therapeutic goods
- European Medicines Agency
- Common Technical Document
