= Ethics committee (European Union) =

The ethics committee, according to Directive 2001/20/EC, is an independent body in a member state of the European Union, consisting of healthcare professionals and non-medical members, whose responsibility is to protect the rights, safety and well-being of human subjects involved in a clinical trial and to provide public assurance of that protection, by, among other things, expressing an opinion on the clinical trial protocol, the suitability of the investigators involved in the trial and the adequacy of facilities, and on the methods and documents to be used to inform trial subjects and obtain their informed consent.

With the Clinical Trials Directive, the European Union (EU) envisioned a harmonisation of research ethics committees (RECs) across Europe, including the time taken to assess a trial proposal and the kinds of issues a committee should take into account.

Local terms for a European ethics committee include:

- A Research Ethics Committee (REC) in the United Kingdom
- A Medical Research Ethics Committee (MREC) in the Netherlands.
- An Ethical Vetting Board in Sweden - (Etikprövningsnämnden in Swedish)
- A Comités de Protection des Personnes (CPP) in France.

== See also ==
- Research ethics
- Ethics committee
- EudraLex
- Directive 2005/28/EC
- Qualified Person
- Institutional Review Board (IRB)
- Regulation of therapeutic goods
- European Medicines Agency
- Investigator's brochure
