= Clinical Trials Directive =

The Clinical Trials Directive (officially Directive 2001/20/EC of 4 April 2001, of the European Parliament and of the Council on the approximation of the laws, regulations and administrative provisions of the Member States relating to implementation of good clinical practice in the conduct of clinical trials on medicinal products for human use) is a European Union directive aimed at facilitating the internal market in medicinal products within the European Union, while at the same time maintaining an appropriate level of protection for public health. It seeks to simplify and harmonise the administrative provisions governing clinical trials in the European Community, by establishing a clear, transparent procedure.

The Member States of the European Union were required to adopt and publish before 1 May 2003 the laws, regulations and administrative provisions necessary to comply with this Directive. The Member States had to apply these provisions at the latest with effect from 1 May 2004.

This Directive was repealed by Regulation 536/2014, dated 16 April 2014, which took effect on January 31st, 2022. The regulation reflected a view that "the legal form of a Regulation" was more appropriate than a directive requiring member state transposition.

== The Articles of the Directive ==
The Articles of the Directive:

- Scope (Directive does not apply to non-interventional trials).
- Definitions
- Protection of clinical trial subjects
- Clinical trials on minors
- Clinical trials on incapacitated adults not able to give informed legal consent
- Ethics Committee
- Single opinion
- Detailed guidance
- Commencement of a clinical trial
- Conduct of a clinical trial
- Exchange of information
- Suspension of the trial or infringements
- Manufacture and import of investigational medicinal products
- Labelling
- Verification of compliance of investigational medicinal products with good clinical and manufacturing practice
- Notification of adverse events
- Notification of serious adverse reactions
- Guidance concerning reports
- General provisions
- Adaptation to scientific and technical progress
- Committee procedure
- Application
- Entry into force
- Addressees

== The effects of the directive ==
It increased the costs of doing clinical trials in the EU, and a reduction in the number of such trials followed its implementation, especially of academic-led studies, and ones looking at new uses for old drugs. Germany derogated from the directive. It is due to be replaced by the EU Clinical Trials Regulation in 2016. The changes are due to come into effect in the second half of 2019.

== See also ==
- EudraLex, the collection of rules and regulations governing medicinal products in the European Union
- Directive 65/65/EEC1, requires prior approval for marketing of proprietary medicinal products
- Directive 75/318/EEC, clarifies requirements of 65/65/EEC1 and requires member states to enforce them
- Directive 75/319/EEC, requires marketing authorisation requests to be drawn up only by qualified experts
- Directive 93/41/EEC, establishes the European Agency for the Evaluation of Medicinal Products
- Directive 2001/20/EC, defines rules for the conduct of clinical trials
- Directive 2001/83/EC
- Directive 2005/28/EC, defines Good Clinical Practice for design and conduct of clinical trials
- European Medicines Agency
- Regulation of therapeutic goods
- Investigator's Brochure
