= European Union Clinical Trials Regulation =

2022 legislation

Regulation (EC) No 536/2014
- European Union regulation
- Title: Regulation (EU) No 536/2014 of the European Parliament and of the Council of 16 April 2014 on clinical trials on medicinal products for human use, and repealing Directive 2001/20/EC Text with EEA relevance

History
- Entry into force: 31 January 2022

The European Union Clinical Trials Regulation (regulation (EU) No 536/2014) is the legislation relating to the conduct of clinical trials of investigational medicinal products within the European Union. The regulations repealed the previous legislation, namely the clinical trials directive and came into force on 31 January 2022.

== Aims of the Clinical Trial Regulations ==
The clinical trial regulations (EU-CTR) ensure that the rights, safety, dignity and well-being of subjects are protected and data generated during clinical trials are robust and reliable. The regulation aims to harmonize the processes for assessment and oversight of clinical trials throughout the EU. Under the previous directive, Sponsors were required to submit separate applications to each EU country in order to conduct multi-country clinical trials within the EU. The EU-CTR enables one application to be made for approval in all EU member states - facilitating improved efficiency in conducing multinational trials.

== Clinical Trials Information System (CTIS) ==
The single submission process for approval to conduct research in all EU member states is facilitated by the Clinical Trials Information System (CTIS). CTIS is an online portal which enables interactions between clinical trial sponsors (that is, the organization responsible for the conduct of the clinical trial), and the regulatory authorities involved in approving the clinical trial application. Further, CTIS is used throughout the clinical trial lifespan to notify regulators of key trial milestones and submit annual safety reports and trial results. Information submitted via CTIS is published on a publicly available website.
