= Medical research =

Wide array of research

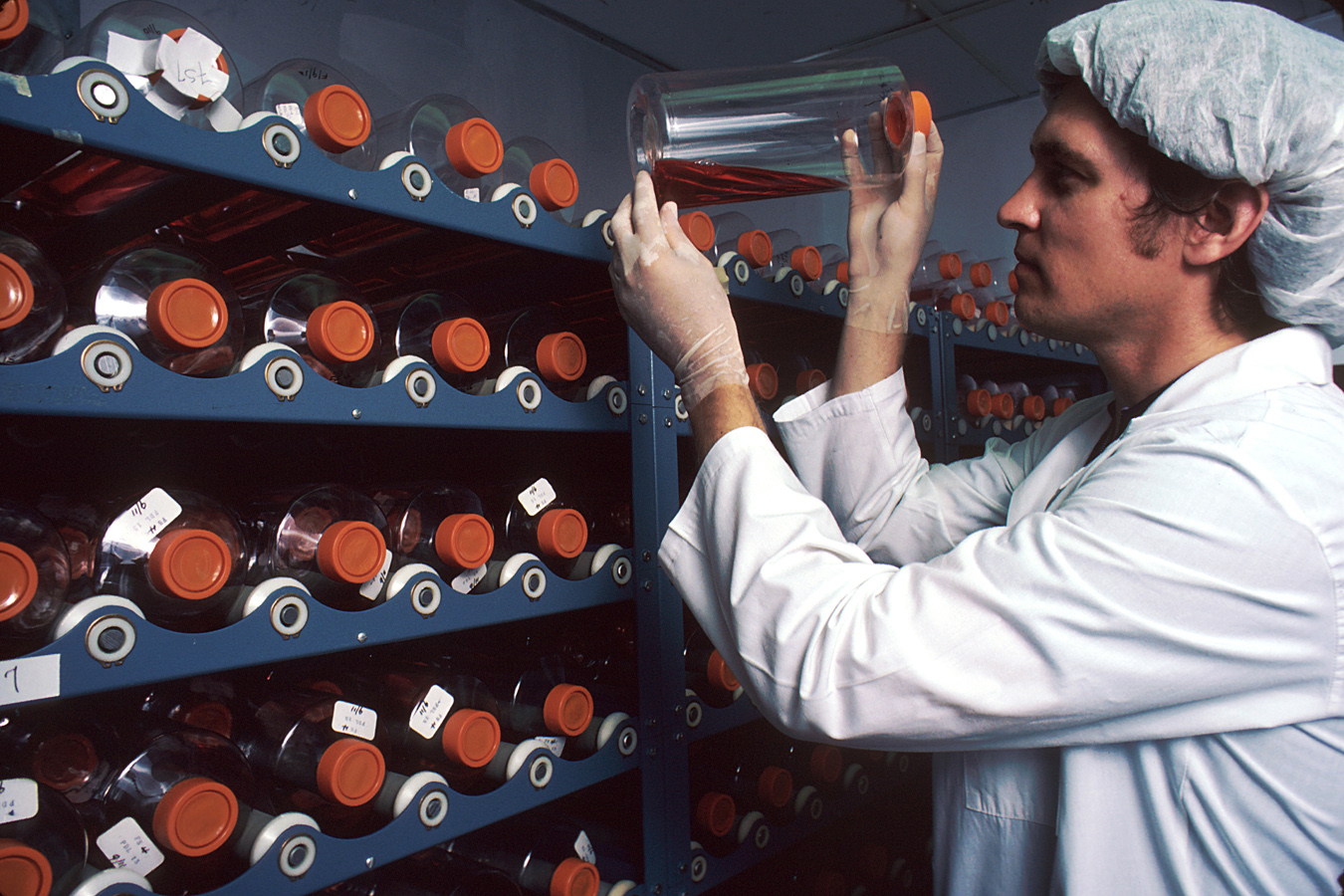
Cell culture vials

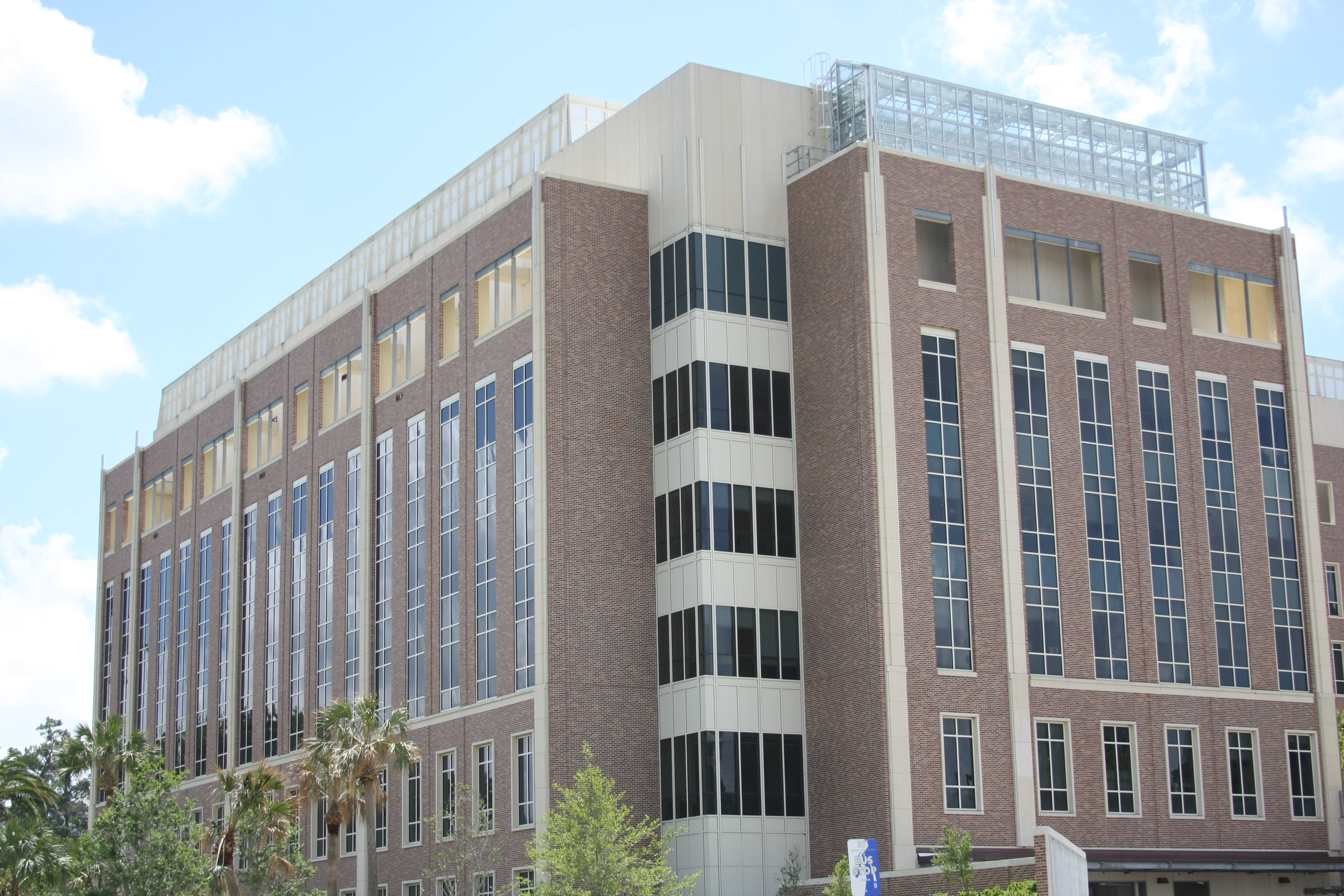
The University of Florida Cancer and Genetics Research Complex is an integrated medical research facility.

Medical research (or biomedical research), also known as health research, refers to the process of using scientific methods with the aim to produce knowledge about human diseases, the prevention and treatment of illness, and the promotion of health.

Medical research encompasses a wide array of research, extending from "basic research" (also called bench science or bench research), – involving fundamental scientific principles that may apply to a preclinical understanding – to clinical research, which involves studies of people who may be subjects in clinical trials. Within this spectrum is applied research, or translational research, conducted to expand knowledge in the field of medicine.

Both clinical and preclinical research phases exist in the pharmaceutical industry's drug development pipelines, where the clinical phase is denoted by the term clinical trial. However, only part of the clinical or preclinical research is oriented towards a specific pharmaceutical purpose. The need for fundamental and mechanism-based understanding, diagnostics, medical devices, and non-pharmaceutical therapies means that pharmaceutical research is only a small part of medical research.

Most research in the field is pursued by biomedical scientists; however, biologists from various other specializations make significant contributions as well. Medical research on humans has to strictly follow the medical ethics sanctioned in the Declaration of Helsinki and the institutional review board where the research is conducted. In all cases, research ethics are expected.

== Impact ==
The increased longevity of humans over the past century can be significantly attributed to advances resulting from medical research. Among the major benefits of medical research have been vaccines for measles and polio, insulin treatment for diabetes, classes of antibiotics for treating a host of maladies, medication for high blood pressure, improved treatments for AIDS, statins and other treatments for atherosclerosis, new surgical techniques such as microsurgery, and increasingly successful treatments for cancer. New, beneficial tests and treatments are expected as a result of the Human Genome Project. Many challenges remain, however, including the appearance of antibiotic resistance and the obesity epidemic.

== Phases of medical research ==
=== Basic medical research ===
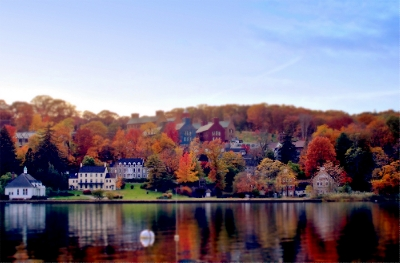
Cold Spring Harbor Laboratory on Long Island, home to eight scientists awarded the Nobel Prize in Physiology or Medicine, is an internationally renowned basic medical research institution.

Example areas in basic medical research include: cellular and molecular biology, medical genetics, immunology, neuroscience, and psychology. Researchers, mainly in universities or government-funded research institutes, aim to establish an understanding of the cellular, molecular and physiological mechanisms of human health and disease.

=== Pre-clinical research ===
Pre-clinical research covers understanding of mechanisms that may lead to clinical research with people. Typically, the work requires no ethical approval, is supervised by scientists rather than physicians, and is carried out in a university or company, rather than a hospital.

=== Clinical research ===
Clinical research is carried out with people as the experimental subjects. It is generally supervised by physicians and conducted by nurses in a medical setting, such as a hospital or research clinic, and requires ethical approval.

== Role of patients and the public ==
Besides being participants in a clinical trial, members of the public can actively collaborate with researchers in designing and conducting medical research. This is known as patient and public involvement (PPI). Public involvement involves a working partnership between patients, caregivers, people with lived experience, and researchers to shape and influence what is researcher and how. PPI can improve the quality of research and make it more relevant and accessible. People with current or past experience of illness can provide a different perspective than professionals and complement their knowledge. Through their personal knowledge they can identify research topics that are relevant and important to those living with an illness or using a service. They can also help to make the research more grounded in the needs of the specific communities they are part of. Public contributors can also ensure that the research is presented in plain language that is clear to the wider society and the specific groups it is most relevant for.

== Funding ==
Net oda to medical research

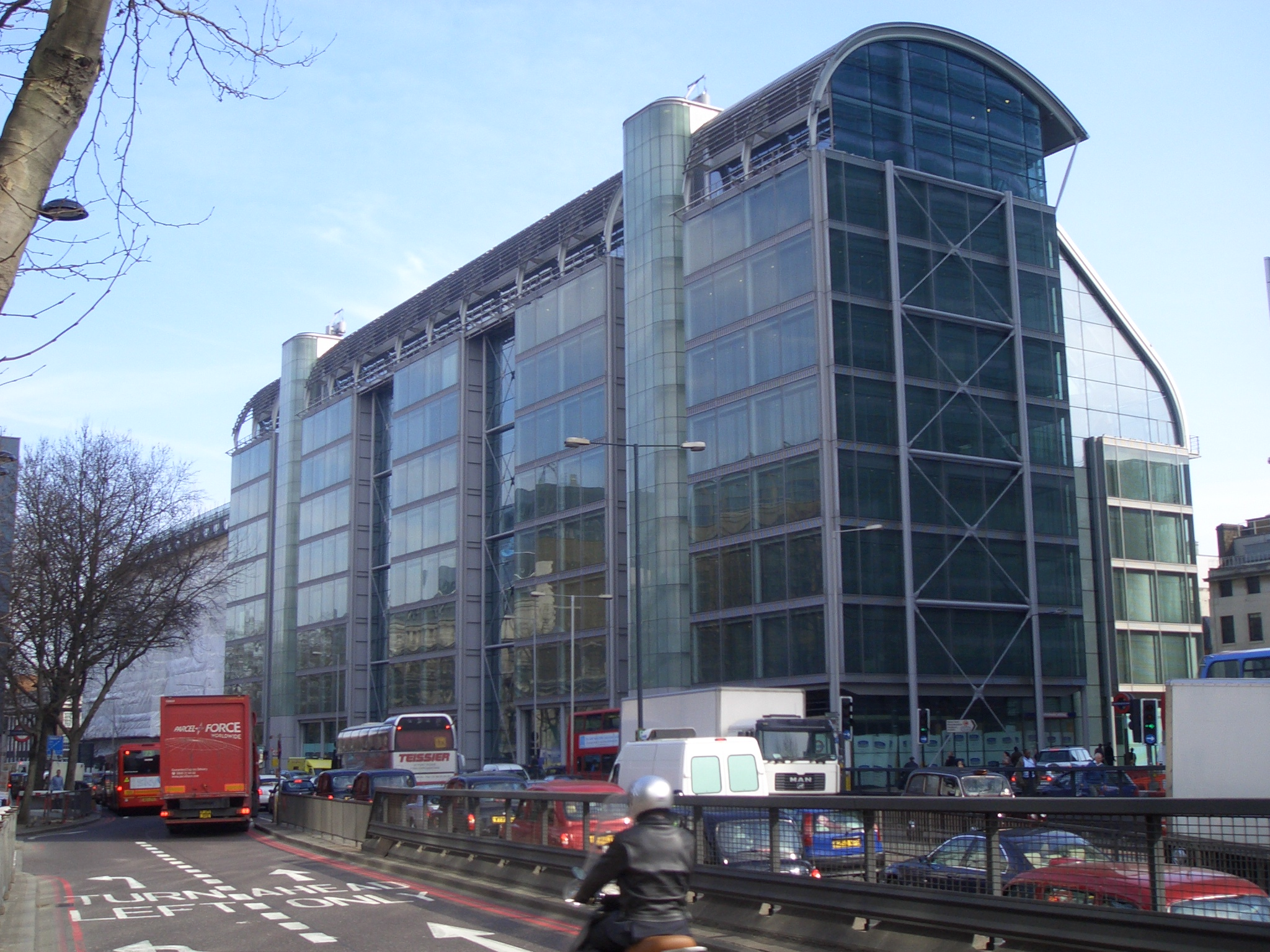
The headquarters of the Wellcome Trust in London, United Kingdom

Biomedical research and development expenditures classified by region in 2012 in billions of U.S. dollars:
Region	Total	Public	Industry
United States	119.3	48.9	70.4
Canada	5.3	3.3	2.0
Europe	81.8	28.1	53.6
Asia-Oceania	62.0	19.3	42.7
Total	268.4		

Research funding in many countries comes from research bodies and private organizations that give money for equipment, salaries, and research costs. In 2024, total global research and development spending reached an estimated $2.9 trillion. Major regions such as the United States, Europe, Asia, Canada, and Australia contributed a large part of this total. China and the United States were nearly equal in their investments. China spent about $785.9 billion, while the United States spent about $781.8 billion on R&D that year. Asia made up roughly 45% of global R&D spending, followed by North America and Europe. The United States' share of total global R&D has decreased compared to past decades as investments in other regions have grown quickly.

In the United Kingdom, funding bodies such as the National Institute for Health and Care Research (NIHR) and the Medical Research Council derive their assets from UK tax payers, and distribute revenues to institutions by competitive research grants. The Wellcome Trust is the UK's largest non-governmental source of funds for biomedical research and provides over £600 million per year in grants to scientists and funds for research centres.

In the United States, data from ongoing surveys by the National Science Foundation (NSF) show that federal agencies provided only 44% of the $86 billion spent on basic research in 2015. The National Institutes of Health and pharmaceutical companies collectively contribute $26.4 billion and $27 billion, which constitute 28% and 29% of the total, respectively. Other significant contributors include biotechnology companies ($17.9 billion, 19% of total), medical device companies ($9.2 billion, 10% of total), other federal sources, and state and local governments. Foundations and charities, led by the Bill and Melinda Gates Foundation, contributed about 3% of the funding. These funders are attempting to maximize their return on investment in public health. One method proposed to maximize the return on investment in medicine is to fund the development of open source hardware for medical research and treatment.

The enactment of orphan drug legislation in some countries has increased funding available to develop drugs meant to treat rare conditions, resulting in breakthroughs that previously were uneconomical to pursue.

=== Government-funded biomedical research ===
Since the establishment of the National Institutes of Health (NIH) in the mid-1940s, the main source of U.S. federal support of biomedical research, investment priorities and levels of funding have fluctuated. From 1995 to 2010, NIH support of biomedical research increased from 11 billion to 27 billion Despite the jump in federal spending, advancements measured by citations to publications and the number of drugs passed by the FDA remained stagnant over the same time span. Financial projections indicate federal spending will remain constant in the near future.

=== US federal funding trends ===
The National Institutes of Health (NIH) is the agency that is responsible for management of the lion's share of federal funding of biomedical research. It funds over 280 areas directly related to health. Over the past century there were two notable periods of NIH support. From 1995 to 1996 funding increased from $8.877 billion to $9.366 billion, years which represented the start of what is considered the "doubling period" of rapid NIH support. The second notable period started in 1997 and ended in 2010, a period where the NIH moved to organize research spending for engagement with the scientific community.

=== Privately (industry) funded biomedical research ===
Since 1980 the share of biomedical research funding from industry sources has grown from 32% to 62%, which has resulted in the development of numerous life-saving medical advances. The relationship between industry and government-funded research in the US has seen great movement over the years. The 1980 Bayh–Dole Act was passed by Congress to foster a more constructive relationship between the collaboration of government and industry funded biomedical research. The Bayh Doyle Act gave private corporations the option of applying for government funded grants for biomedical research which in turn allowed the private corporations to license the technology. Both government and industry research funding increased rapidly from between the years of 1994–2003; industry saw a compound average annual growth rate of 8.1% a year and slowed only slightly to a compound average annual growth rate of 5.8% from 2003 to 2008.

=== Conflicts of interests ===
"Conflict of interest" in the field of medical research has been defined as "a set of conditions in which professional judgment concerning a primary interest (such as a person's welfare or the validity of research) tends to be unduly influenced by a secondary interest (such as financial gain)."

Regulation on industry funded biomedical research has seen great changes since Samuel Hopkins Adams declaration. In 1906 Congress passed the Pure Food and Drug Act of 1906. In 1912 Congress passed the Shirley Amendment to prohibit the wide dissemination of false information on pharmaceuticals. The Food and Drug Administration was formally created in 1930 under the McNarey Mapes Amendment to oversee the regulation of Food and Drugs in the United States. In 1962 the Kefauver-Harris Amendments to the Food, Drug and Cosmetics Act made it so that before a drug was marketed in the United States the FDA must first approve that the drug was safe. The Kefauver-Harris amendments also mandated that more stringent clinical trials must be performed before a drug is brought to the market. The Kefauver-Harris amendments were met with opposition from industry due to the requirement of lengthier clinical trial periods that would lessen the period of time in which the investor is able to see return on their money. In the pharmaceutical industry patents are typically granted for a 20-year period of time, and most patent applications are submitted during the early stages of the product development. According to Ariel Katz on average after a patent application is submitted it takes an additional 8 years before the FDA approves a drug for marketing. As such this would leave a company with only 12 years to market the drug to see a return on their investments. After a sharp decline of new drugs entering the US market following the 1962 Kefauver-Harris amendments economist Sam Petlzman concluded that cost of loss of innovation was greater than the savings recognized by consumers no longer purchasing ineffective drugs. In 1984 the Hatch-Waxman Act or the Drug Price Competition and Patent Term Restoration Act of 1984 was passed by congress. The Hatch-Waxman Act was passed with the idea that giving brand manufacturers the ability to extend their patent by an additional 5 years would create greater incentives for innovation and private sector funding for investment.

The relationship that exists with industry funded biomedical research is that of which industry is the financier for academic institutions which in turn employ scientific investigators to conduct research. A fear that exists wherein a project is funded by industry is that firms might negate informing the public of negative effects to better promote their product. A list of studies shows that public fear of the conflicts of interest that exist when biomedical research is funded by industry can be considered valid after a 2003 publication of "Scope and Impact of Financial Conflicts of Interest in Biomedical Research" in The Journal of American Association of Medicine. This publication included 37 different studies that met specific criteria to determine whether or not an academic institution or scientific investigator funded by industry had engaged in behavior that could be deduced to be a conflict of interest in the field of biomedical research. Survey results from one study concluded that 43% of scientific investigators employed by a participating academic institution had received research related gifts and discretionary funds from industry sponsors. Another participating institution surveyed showed that 7.6% of investigators were financially tied to research sponsors, including paid speaking engagements (34%), consulting arrangements (33%), advisory board positions (32%) and equity (14%). A 1994 study concluded that 58% out of 210 life science companies indicated that investigators were required to withhold information pertaining to their research as to extend the life of the interested companies' patents. Rules and regulations regarding conflict of interest disclosures are being studied by experts in the biomedical research field to eliminate conflicts of interest that could possibly affect the outcomes of biomedical research.

=== Transparency laws ===
Two laws which are both still in effect, one passed in 2006 and the other in 2010, were instrumental in defining funding reporting standards for biomedical research, and defining for the first time reporting regulations that were previously not required. The 2006 Federal Funding Accountability and Transparency Act mandates that all entities receiving over $25,000 in federal funds must report annual spending reports, including disclosure of executive salaries. The 2010 amendment to the act mandates that progress reports be submitted along with financial reporting. Data from the federal mandate is managed and made publicly available on usaspending.gov. Aside from the main source, usaspending.gov, other reporting mechanisms exist: Data specifically on biomedical research funding from federal sources is made publicly available by the National Health Expenditure Accounts (NHEA), data on health services research, approximately 0.1% of federal funding on biomedical research, is available through the Coalition of Health Services Research, the Agency for Healthcare Research and Quality, the Centers for Disease Control and Prevention, the Centers for Medicare & Medicaid Services, and the Veterans Health Administration.

Currently, there are not any funding reporting requirements for industry sponsored research, but there has been voluntary movement toward this goal. In 2014, major pharmaceutical stakeholders such as Roche and Johnson and Johnson have made financial information publicly available and Pharmaceutical Research and Manufacturers of America (PhRMA), the most prominent professional association for biomedical research companies, has recently begun to provide limited public funding reports.

== History ==
=== Ancient to 20th century in other regions ===
The earliest narrative describing a medical trial is found in the Book of Daniel, which says that Babylonian king Nebuchadnezzar ordered youths of royal blood to eat only red meat and wine for three years, while another group of youths ate only beans and water. The experiment was intended to determine if a diet of vegetables and water was healthier than a diet of wine and red meat. At the experiment endpoint, the trial accomplished its prerogative: the youths who ate only beans and water were noticeably healthier. Scientific curiosity to understand health outcomes from varying treatments has been present for centuries, but it was not until the mid-19th century when an organizational platform was created to support and regulate this curiosity. In 1945, Vannevar Bush said that biomedical scientific research was "the pacemaker of technological progress", an idea which contributed to the initiative to found the National Institutes of Health (NIH) in 1948, a historical benchmark that marked the beginning of a near century substantial investment in biomedical research.

=== 20th and 21st century in the United States ===
The NIH provides more financial support for medical research than any other agency in the world to date and claims responsibility for numerous innovations that have improved global health. The historical funding of biomedical research has undergone many changes over the past century. Innovations such as the polio vaccine, antibiotics and antipsychotic agents, developed in the early years of the NIH lead to social and political support of the agency. Political initiatives in the early 1990s lead to a doubling of NIH funding, spurring an era of great scientific progress. There have been dramatic changes in the era since the turn of the 21st century to date; roughly around the start of the century, the cost of trials dramatically increased while the rate of scientific discoveries did not keep pace.

Biomedical research spending increased substantially faster than GDP growth over the past decade in the US, between the years of 2003 and 2007 spending increased 14% per year, while GDP growth increased 1% over the same period (both measures adjusted for inflation). Industry, not-for-profit entities, state and federal funding spending combined accounted for an increase in funding from $75.5 billion in 2003 to $101.1 billion in 2007. Due to the immediacy of federal financing priorities and stagnant corporate spending during the recession, biomedical research spending decreased 2% in real terms in 2008. Despite an overall increase of investment in biomedical research, there has been stagnation, and in some areas a marked decline in the number of drug and device approvals over the same time period.

As of 2010, industry sponsored research accounts for 58% of expenditures, NIH for 27% of expenditures, state governments for 5% of expenditures, non NIH-federal sources for 5% of expenditures and not-for-profit entities accounted for 4% of support. Federally funded biomedical research expenditures increased nominally, 0.7% (adjusted for inflation), from 2003 to 2007. Previous reports showed a stark contrast in federal investment, from 1994 to 2003, federal funding increased 100% (adjusted for inflation).

The NIH manages the majority, over 85%, of federal biomedical research expenditures. NIH support for biomedical research decreased from $31.8 billion in 2003, to $29.0 billion in 2007, a 25% decline (in real terms adjusted for inflation), while non-NIH federal funding allowed for the maintenance of government financial support levels through the era (the 0.7% four-year increase). Spending from industry-initiated research increased 25% (adjusted for inflation) over the same time period of time, from 2003 to 2007, an increase from $40 billion in 2003, to $58.6 billion in 2007. Industry sourced expenditures from 1994 to 2003 showed industry sponsored research funding increased 8.1%, a stark contrast to 25% increase in recent years.

Of industry sponsored research, pharmaceutical firm spending was the greatest contributor from all industry sponsored biomedical research spending, but only increased 15% (adjusted for inflation) from 2003 to 2007, while device and biotechnology firms accounted for the majority of the spending. The stock performance, a measure that can be an indication of future firm growth or technological direction, has substantially increased for both predominantly medical device and biotechnology producers. Contributing factors to this growth are thought to be less rigorous FDA approval requirements for devices as opposed to drugs, lower cost of trials, lower pricing and profitability of products and predictable influence of new technology due to a limited number of competitors. Another visible shift during the era was a shift in focus to late stage research trials; formerly dispersed, since 1994 an increasingly large portion of industry-sponsored research was late phase trials rather than early-experimental phases now accounting for the majority of industry sponsored research. This shift is attributable to a lower risk investment and a shorter development to market schedule. The low risk preference is also reflected in the trend of large pharmaceutical firms acquiring smaller companies that hold patents to newly developed drug or device discoveries which have not yet passed federal regulation (large companies are mitigating their risk by purchasing technology created by smaller companies in early-phase high-risk studies). Medical research support from universities increased from $22 billion in 2003 to $27.7 billion in 2007, a 7.8% increase (adjusted for inflation). In 2007 the most heavily funded institutions received 20% of HIN medical research funding, and the top 50 institutions received 58% of NIH medical research funding, the percent of funding allocated to the largest institutions is a trend which has increased only slightly over data from 1994. Relative to federal and private funding, health policy and service research accounted for a nominal amount of sponsored research; health policy and service research was funded $1.8 billion in 2003, which increased to $2.2 billion in 2008.

Stagnant rates of investment from the US government over the past decade may be in part attributable to challenges that plague the field. To date, only two-thirds of published drug trial findings have results that can be re-produced, which raises concerns from a US regulatory standpoint where great investment has been made in research ethics and standards, yet trial results remain inconsistent. Federal agencies have called upon greater regulation to address these problems; a spokesman from the National Institute of Neurological Disorders and Stroke, an agency of the NIH, stated that there is "widespread poor reporting of experimental design in articles and grant applications, that animal research should follow a core set of research parameters, and that a concerted effort by all stakeholders is needed to disseminate best reporting practices and put them into practice".

== Regulations and guidelines ==
Medical research is highly regulated. National regulatory authorities are appointed in most countries to oversee and monitor medical research, such as for the development and distribution of new drugs. In the United States, the Food and Drug Administration oversees new drug development; in Europe, the European Medicines Agency (see also EudraLex); and in Japan, the Ministry of Health, Labour and Welfare. The World Medical Association develops the ethical standards for medical professionals involved in medical research. The most fundamental of them is the Declaration of Helsinki. The International Conference on Harmonisation of Technical Requirements for Registration of Pharmaceuticals for Human Use (ICH) works on the creation of rules and guidelines for the development of new medication, such as the guidelines for Good Clinical Practice (GCP). All ideas of regulation are based on a country's ethical standards code. This is why treatment of a particular disease in one country may not be allowed, but is in another.

== Flaws and vulnerabilities ==
A major flaw and vulnerability in biomedical research appears to be the hypercompetition for the resources and positions that are required to conduct science. The competition seems to suppress the creativity, cooperation, risk-taking, and original thinking required to make fundamental discoveries. Other consequences of today's highly pressured environment for research appear to be a substantial number of research publications whose results cannot be replicated, and perverse incentives in research funding that encourage grantee institutions to grow without making sufficient investments in their own faculty and facilities. Other risky trends include a decline in the share of key research grants going to younger scientists, as well as a steady rise in the age at which investigators receive their first funding.

A significant flaw in biomedical research is the toxic culture that particularly impacts medical students and early career researchers. They face challenges such as bullying, harassment, and unethical authorship practices. Intense competition for funding and publication pressures fosters a climate of secrecy and self-protection, stifling creativity and collaboration. The power imbalance in academic hierarchies exacerbates these issues, with junior researchers often subjected to exploitative practices and denied proper recognition for their contributions.

== Commercialization ==
After clinical research, medical therapies are typically commercialized by private companies such as pharmaceutical companies or medical device company. In the United States, one estimate found that in 2011, one-third of Medicare physician and outpatient hospital spending was on new technologies unavailable in the prior decade.

Medical therapies are constantly being researched, so the difference between a therapy which is investigational versus standard of care is not always clear, particularly given cost-effectiveness considerations. Payers have utilization management clinical guidelines which do not pay for "experimental or investigational" therapies, or may require that the therapy is medically necessary or superior to cheaper treatments. For example, proton therapy was approved by the FDA, but private health insurers in the United States considered it unproven or unnecessary given its high cost, although it was ultimately covered for certain cancers.

== Fields of research ==
Fields of biomedical research include:

- Aging
- Anatomy
- Behavioral health
- Biochemistry
- Biomaterials
- Biology
  - Cellular biology
  - Molecular biology
- Cardiovascular
- Biostatistics
- Cancer
- Chemistry
- Diabetes
- Endocrinology
- Epigenetics
- Epidemiology
- Genetics
- Immunology
- Microbiology
- Nanomaterials
- Neuroendocrinology
- Neuroscience
- Ophthalmology
- Pharmacology
- Physiology
- Preventive medicine
- Psychopharmacology
- Public health
- Tissue engineering
- Virology
- Otolaryngology
- Toxicology
- Angiology
- Palliative medicine

== See also ==
- Animal testing
- Biomedical informatics
- Biomedical research in the United States
- Biomedical technology
- Biomedicine
- Cancer research
- Gain-of-function research
- Medical research scientist
- Medical Scientist Training Program
- Pharmaceutical company
- Preclinical imaging
- Title 21 of the Code of Federal Regulations (US)
