= Direct Payments Regulation 2013 =

EU payments regulation

Directive (EU) No 1307/2013
- European Union directive
- Title: Direct Payments Regulation 2013
- Made by: European Parliament and Council

History
- Date made: 17 December 2013

The Direct Payments Regulation (EU) No 1307/2013 is a Regulation in EU law that sets out rules for receiving subsidies under the Common Agricultural Policy.

== Contents ==
=== Title I - Scope and Definitions ===
Title I establishes the foundational elements of Regulation, defining its scope and the essential terms for its application:

- Article 1: Outlines the overall applicability of the regulation, setting the stage for its broad reach across the EU.
- Article 2: Details amendments to Annex I, reflecting the evolving nature of the regulation and ensuring its current relevance.
- Article 3: Expands the regulation's application to the EU's outermost regions and the smaller Aegean islands, emphasizing its inclusive and comprehensive scope.
- Article 4: Provides clear definitions for key terms used throughout the regulation, ensuring a uniform understanding and implementation across different member states.

=== Title II - General Provisions on Direct Payments ===
Title II details the rules governing direct payments under the Common Agricultural Policy:

- Article 5 - General Common Agricultural Policy Provisions: Specifies that Regulation (EU) No 1306/2013 applies to the schemes in this Regulation, aligning it with broader CAP guidelines.
- Article 6 - National Ceilings: Sets annual maximum limits on direct payments for each Member State, a measure to distribute CAP funds proportionately among EU countries.
- Article 7 - Net Ceilings: Caps total direct payments in each Member State post-application of Article 11, focusing on equitable distribution and preventing aid concentration.
- Article 9 - Active Farmer: Establishes eligibility criteria for direct payments, targeting funds to those genuinely involved in agriculture.
- Article 10 - Minimum Requirements for Receiving Direct Payments: Details conditions under which farmers may be ineligible for payments, such as minimal payment amounts, to prioritize impactful support.
- Article 11 - Reduction of Payments: Directs a reduction in payments for larger farms, supporting the CAP's focus on smaller and medium-sized agricultural operations.

=== Title III - Basic Payment Scheme, Single Area Payment Scheme, and Related Payments ===
Title III addresses the structures and conditions of the basic payment and single area payment schemes:

- Article 21: Establishes entitlement criteria for the basic payment scheme, outlining the prerequisites for farmers to receive payments.
- Article 22: Sets the maximum budget available under the basic payment scheme, ensuring a limit on the total funds allocated.
- Article 23: Details the distribution of national ceilings among regions within Member States, aiming for a balanced allocation of funds.

=== Title IV - Coupled Support ===
Title IV discusses the specifics of additional support measures for certain agricultural sectors:

- Article 52: Lays out the framework for voluntary coupled support, targeting specific agricultural sectors that need additional aid.
- Article 53: Details the financial provisions for implementing coupled support, outlining the budgetary aspects.

=== Title V - Small Farmers Scheme ===
Title V introduces specific provisions for small-scale farmers, aiming to cater to their unique needs:

- Article 61: Defines the framework and conditions for participation in the Small Farmers Scheme, targeting smaller agricultural operations.
- Article 62: Describes the requirements and process for small farmers to become part of the scheme.

=== Title VI - National Restructuring Programmes for the Cotton Sector ===
Title VI focuses on restructuring programmes in the cotton sector, addressing specific industry needs:

- Article 66: Details the use of annual budgets for restructuring programmes in the cotton sector, highlighting financial management aspects.

=== Title VII - Final Provisions ===
Title VII contains the concluding elements of the regulation:

- Article 67: Specifies requirements for notifications related to the regulation, ensuring compliance and transparency.
- Article 68: Addresses the processing and protection of personal data within the context of the regulation, underscoring data privacy concerns.
- Article 69: Discusses measures for resolving specific problems, providing a framework for addressing unforeseen issues.

== Conclusion ==
Regulation (EU) No 1307/2013 represents a significant legislative measure under the Common Agricultural Policy (CAP) framework, aiming to modernize, simplify, and make more equitable the system of direct payments to farmers within the European Union. The regulation establishes clear criteria and ceilings for payments, ensuring a balanced distribution of support, emphasizing sustainable and environmentally friendly agricultural practices, and catering to the diverse needs of various agricultural sectors including small farmers and specific crop sectors.

The regulation's comprehensive scope, covering everything from general provisions on direct payments to specific schemes like the Basic Payment Scheme and support for small farmers.

By setting out detailed rules and conditions for direct payments, the regulation not only provides financial support to farmers but also contributes to the broader objectives of the CAP, including rural development, environmental protection, and maintaining the viability of the agricultural sector across the EU.

== See also ==
- EU law
- UK enterprise law
