= Committee for Medicinal Products for Human Use =

European Medicines Agency committee

- Predecessor: Committee for Proprietary Medicinal Products (CPMP)
- Formation: 1975; 51 years ago
- Type: Scientific committee
- Headquarters: Amsterdam, Netherlands
- Parent organization: European Medicines Agency
- Website: www.ema.europa.eu/en/committees/committee-medicinal-products-human-use-chmp

The Committee for Medicinal Products for Human Use (CHMP), formerly known as the Committee for Proprietary Medicinal Products (CPMP), is a scientific committee of the European Medicines Agency (EMA) responsible for evaluating medicinal products intended for human use within the European Union (EU). The committee assesses the quality, safety, and efficacy of medicines submitted through the EU's centralized marketing authorization procedure and issues scientific opinions that inform the European Commission's decisions on whether medicines may be marketed across the EU.

Established in 1975 as the CPMP, the committee became part of the European Medicines Agency when the agency began operations in 1995 and was renamed the CHMP under Regulation (EC) No 726/2004.

== History ==
=== Establishment of the CPMP (1975) ===
The committee was established under its original name, the Committee for Proprietary Medicinal Products (CPMP) by the Second Council Directive 75/319/EEC, adopted on 20 May 1975 and enacted on 20 November 1977.

Directive 75/319/EEC created a multi-state procedure based on the mutual recognition of national marketing authorisations. Under this procedure, a company that had obtained authorisation in one member state could apply for that authorisation to be recognised in at least two further member states. The CPMP was given an arbitration function: when a member state declined to recognise another state's licensing decision, the matter could be referred to the CPMP for an opinion. In this initial form, that opinion was non-binding and advisory.

The original 'CPMP procedure' (operational from 1976 to 1985) was simplified into the 'multi-state licensing procedure' (operational from 1986 to 1995) before being replaced by the mutual recognition procedure in 1995.

=== Integration into the EMA (1995) ===
The European Medicines Agency (initially named the European Agency for the Evaluation of Medicinal Products, EMEA) was established by Regulation (EEC) No. 2309/93, and began operations in 1995. The regulation introduced the centralised procedure, under which a single application to the EMA resulted in a marketing authorisation valid across all EU member states. The CPMP was incorporated into the agency's structure and became responsible for conducting scientific assessments under the centralised procedure and issuing opinions to the European Commission.

Regulation (EC) No 726/2004, adopted on 31 March 2004, restructured the EU pharmaceutical legislative framework and formally established the Committee for Medicinal Products for Human Use (CHMP) as the successor to the CPMP.

== Role and functions ==
=== Marketing authorisation ===
Under the centralised procedure, the CHMP conducts the initial scientific assessment of EU-wide marketing authorisation applications, evaluating whether a medicine meets the required standards of quality, safety, and efficacy, and whether it has a positive risk–benefit balance. Following its evaluation, the CHMP issues an opinion that serves as the basis for a decision by the European Commission, which grants, refuses, suspends, or revokes a marketing authorisation valid across the EU. The Commission has 67 days following a CHMP opinion to adopt its decision. Where an applicant disagrees with a negative CHMP opinion, a re-examination may be requested, which may take up to a further 120 days.

The standard active assessment timeline under the centralised procedure is 210 days, excluding clock stops during which the applicant provides additional data in response to questions from the committee.

The centralised procedure is mandatory for products derived from biotechnology, orphan medicinal products, and medicines for the treatment of AIDS, cancer, neurodegenerative disorders, and diabetes that contain an active substance authorised in the EU after 20 May 2004. It is available optionally to other products that contain a new active substance, represent a significant therapeutic or scientific innovation, or for which an EU-wide authorisation is in the interest of patients.

The CHMP also assesses modifications and extensions (known as variations) to existing marketing authorisations, and evaluates medicines authorised at national level that are referred to the EMA for a harmonised EU-wide position through referral procedures.

The CHMP also evaluates applications for conditional marketing authorisation, which allows certain medicines addressing unmet medical needs to be authorised before comprehensive clinical data are available. To qualify, a medicine must demonstrate a positive benefit-risk balance, and the benefits of its immediate availability must outweigh the risks associated with outstanding evidence.

=== Pharmacovigilance ===
The CHMP considers recommendations from the Pharmacovigilance Risk Assessment Committee (PRAC) on the safety of medicines already on the market since 2012. Where necessary, it recommends to the European Commission changes to a medicine's marketing authorisation, including its suspension or withdrawal from the market.

=== Membership ===
The CHMP is composed of one member and one alternate appointed by each EU member state after consulting EMA's Management Board, and one member and one alternate appointed by each of the three EEA–EFTA states: Iceland, Norway, and Liechtenstein. The committee may also include up to five co-opted members, chosen from experts nominated by member states or the Agency, to provide additional expertise in a particular scientific area.

EEA–EFTA state members participate in scientific deliberations but do not vote on the adoption of committee opinions. Their positions are recorded separately in the opinion, the minutes, and any divergent opinions appended to the committee's opinion. The committee meets once a month at the EMA.

== Impact and Reception ==
The CHMP is formally advisory and issues a scientific opinion to the European Commission, which then makes the final legally binding decision on EU marketing authorization. In practice, the Commission has followed CHMP opinions in nearly all recorded cases. This differs from the approach of the U.S. Food and Drug Administration (FDA), which has on occasion departed from the recommendations of its advisory committees, both rejecting drugs that committees recommended and approving drugs that committees opposed. The Commission's practice of largely deferring to CHMP opinions has been described as "rubber-stamping" by some scholars.

== See also ==
- Committee for Medicinal Products for Veterinary Use
- Pharmacovigilance Risk Assessment Committee
- European Medicines Agency
