= Agricultural Products Regulation 2013 =

Regulation No 1308/2013
- European Union regulation
- Title: Agricultural Products Regulation 2013
- Made by: European Parliament and Council

The Agricultural Products Regulation 2013 (Regulation (EU) No 1308/2013) is a European Union regulation that enables the limit of supply of agricultural goods to support fair prices.

== Contents ==
Article 8 states that certain crops and meat are eligible for purchase by member state authorities, to be ‘stored by them until disposed of’, with extra aid for storage.

== See also ==
- EU law
- UK enterprise law
