= Gross National Income Regulation 2019 =

Regulation (EU) 2019/516
- European Union regulation
- Title: Gross National Income Regulation
- Made by: European Parliament and Council

The Gross National Income Regulation (EU) 2019/516 (2019/516) is a Regulation in EU law that sets out methods for calculating "Gross Domestic Product" and "Gross National Income" in EU accounts and for member states.

== Contents ==
Article 1(1) states that "Gross national income at market prices (GNI) and gross domestic product at market prices (GDP) shall be defined in accordance with the European System of Accounts 2010 (ESA 2010) established by Regulation (EU) No 549/2013." Article 1(2) then states, "GDP means the final result of the production activity of resident producer units. It can be defined in three ways:

(a) production approach: GDP is the sum of gross value added of the various institutional sectors or the various industries plus taxes and less subsidies on products (which are not allocated to sectors and industries). It is also the balancing item in the total economy production account;
(b) expenditure approach: GDP is the sum of final uses of goods and services by resident institutional units (final consumption and gross capital formation) plus exports and minus imports of goods and services;
(c) income approach: GDP is the sum of uses in the total economy generation of income account (compensation of employees, taxes on production and imports less subsidies, gross operating surplus and mixed income of the total economy)."

Article 5 requires that GNI measures are reliable, exhaustive and comparable.

== Criticism ==
The measures of GDP and GNI are widely criticised as countiung as positive production that causes widespread pollution, greenhouse gas emissions, or harm to human health, particularly from gas, oil, coal, tobacco, firearms or other deadly products and substances. Since it already excludes illegal products (such as drugs) from accounts, it has been recommended that GDP and GNI is redefined to exclude harmful (even if lawful) production.

== See also ==
- EU law
- UK enterprise law
