= Heavy Vehicle Emission Regulation 2019 =

The Heavy Vehicle Emission Regulation 2019 (EU) 2019/1242 is an EU regulation that limits the toxic exhausts of lorries, trucks or other heavy vehicles by auto-makers.

== Contents ==
Article 1 sets the scope of the Regulation, and requires heavy vehicle fleet emissions are reduced by 15% by 2025 and 30% by 2030.

Article 4 imposes limits for CO_{2} from heavy vehicles, according to Annex I.

Article 5 requires zero emission vehicle factors to be introduced for each manufacturer.

== See also ==
- EU law
- UK enterprise law
