= Euromyth =

Exaggerated or invented story about the European Union

A euromyth is an exaggerated or invented story about the European Union (EU) and the activities of its institutions, such as purportedly nonsensical EU legislation.

Conversely, the same term has been applied by Eurosceptics to purportedly misleading or exaggerated claims by the European Commission, and some assert that the term (in the former sense) is falsely applied to true stories.

Debate as to whether a particular claim is true sometimes continues long after the original story appeared. On occasions, Euromyths may arise when the actions of a different European organisation, such as the Council of Europe, are erroneously attributed to the EU.

In 2000, the British government announced a policy of publicly rebutting such myths and accused journalists of failing in their mission to inform. Accusations of distorted or untruthful reporting are most commonly directed at conservative and Eurosceptic sections of the British media. Stories can present the European civil service as drafting rules that "defy common sense". Examples cited as Euromyths include stories about rules banning mince pies, prawn cocktail crisps, curved bananas and mushy peas. Others include a story that English fish and chips shops would be forced to use Latin names for their fish (The Sun, 5 September 2001), that double-decker buses would be banned (The Times, 9 April 1998), or that barmaids would have to cover up their cleavage.

In some cases, Euromyth stories have been traced to deliberate attempts by lobbyists to influence actions by the European bureaucracy, such as the level of customs duties for particular products. EU officials have also claimed that many such stories result from unclear or misunderstood information on complicated policies, and are claimed to have seized on minor errors in stories as evidence that they are entirely fictional.

== Examples ==
=== British sausage as an "Emulsified High Fat Offal Tube" ===
A 1984 episode of the satirical television programme Yes Minister included a plotline in which the Commission would require the renaming of the British sausage as an "emulsified high fat offal tube" on account of it not containing enough meat. Although Jim Hacker, the government minister responsible for its implementation, managed to get British sausages exempt, he informed the press of the requirement in order to boost his standing in his party's leadership contest. The "eurosausage" story is used as an amusing but fictional example of a Euromyth.

=== Straight bananas ===
The alleged ban on curved bananas is a long-standing, famous and stereotypical claim that is used in headlines to typify the Euromyth. With other issues of acceptable quality and standards, the regulation specifies minimum dimensions and states that bananas shall be free from deformation or abnormal curvature. The provisions relating to shape apply fully only to bananas sold as Extra class; slight defects of shape (but not size) are permitted in Class I and Class II bananas. A proposal banning straight bananas and other misshapen fruits was brought before the European Parliament in 2008 and defeated.

On 29 July 2008, the European Commission held a preliminary vote towards repealing certain regulations relating to other fruit and vegetables but not bananas. According to the Commission's press release, "In this era of high prices and growing demand, it makes no sense to throw these products away or destroy them [...] It shouldn't be the EU's job to regulate these things. It is far better to leave it to market operators". Some Eurosceptic sources have claimed this to be an admission that the original regulations did indeed ban undersized or misshapen fruit and vegetables.

On 25 March 2010, a BBC article stated that there were EU shape standardisation regulations in force on "apples, citrus fruit, kiwi fruit, lettuces, peaches and nectarines, pears, strawberries, sweet peppers, table grapes and tomatoes" and "Marketing standards for 26 types of produce had been scrapped in November 2008, following information that a fifth of produce had been rejected by shops across the EU for failing to meet the requirements".

== See also ==
- Brexit
- Card stacking
- Counterpropaganda
- Disinformation
- Fake news
- Half-truth
- News propaganda
- Political alienation
- Political apathy
- Post-truth politics
- Reputation management
- Spin (propaganda)
- Urban legend
