= European Directive on Traditional Herbal Medicinal Products =

Directive 2004/24/EC
- European Union directive
- Title: Directive on Traditional Herbal Medicinal Products
- Made by: European Parliament & Council
- Made under: Article 95
- Journal reference: L136, 30 April 2004, pp. 85–90

History
- Date made: 31 March 2004
- Entry into force: 30 April 2004
- Implementation date: 30 October 2005

Other legislation
- Amends: Directive 2001/83/EC

The European Directive on Traditional Herbal Medicinal Products (THMPD), formally the Directive 2004/24/EC amending, as regards traditional herbal medicinal products, Directive 2001/83/EC on the Community code relating to medicinal products for human use, was established by the European Parliament and Council on 31 March 2004 to provide a simplified regulatory approval process for traditional herbal medicines in the European Union (EU). Previously, there was no formal EU wide authorisation procedure, so each EU member state regulated these types of products at the national level.

Under this regulation, all herbal medicinal products are required to obtain an authorisation to market within the EU. Those products marketed before this legislation came into force can continue to market their product until 30 April 2011, under the transitional measures defined in the Traditional Herbal Medicinal Products Directive. Once this time limit has expired, all herbal medicinal products must have prior authorisation before they can be marketed in the EU.

For those herbal medicinal products that were not on the market before 30 April 2004, an authorisation must be obtained prior to marketing.

The only herbal medicines that are exempted from the provisions of the Traditional Herbal Medicinal Products Directive are those unlicensed remedies that are made up for a patient following a consultation with a herbalist.

Herbal medicines must be now manufactured under Good Manufacturing Practice (GMP) to ensure the quality of the finished product and also demonstrate safety.

Under the Traditional Herbal Medicinal Products Directive, a company needs to demonstrate that the herbal medicine has been in use within the EU for at least 30 years or 15 years within the EU and 30 years outside the EU. There is concern that some herbal remedies of 30 years ago, which are no longer in widespread use, could still be sold but that valid new herbs which cannot meet the 30-year rule may require to be withdrawn from sale. The rule could also mean that it may not be possible to license some traditional herbal medicines which were in common use more than 30 years ago, but have since fallen into disuse.

There are key eligibility criteria for a herbal medicine to qualify under this legislation:

- Only herbal medicines that are administered orally, externally, or by inhalation are suitable. Any medication that requires intravenous administration will not be authorised.
- Only herbal medicines that are intended to be used without supervision by a medical doctor will be authorised by this scheme.
- The intended use of a herbal medicine will only be authorised on the basis of its traditional history and/or the recognised pharmacological properties of the herbal ingredient(s).
- Vitamins and minerals may be added to the herbal medicine provided that their use is ancillary to the herbal ingredient(s).
- If the competent EU member judges that the herbal medicine fulfills the criteria for a marketing authorisation, then an authorisation under Traditional Herbal Medicines Product Directive should be granted.
- Herbal medicine products manufactured using isolated active ingredients from plants will not be regarded as herbal medicines and will not receive an authorisation under this scheme.

The Traditional Herbal Medicines Product Directive does allow medicinal claims to be made on the label of the final product, although restrictions do apply on the final wording.
