= Framework decision =

Former EU law on criminal justice

A framework decision was a kind of legislative act of the European Union used exclusively within the EU's competences in police and judicial co-operation in criminal justice matters. Framework decisions were similar to directives in that they required Member States to achieve particular results without dictating the means of achieving that result. However, unlike directives, framework decisions were not capable of direct effect. They were subject only to the optional jurisdiction of the European Court of Justice and enforcement proceedings could not be taken by the European Commission for any failure to transpose a framework decision into domestic law.

Framework decisions were created in the Amsterdam Treaty and replaced joint actions which were legal instruments available under the Maastricht Treaty. The Lisbon Treaty abolished framework decisions and the EU can now enact directives and regulations in the area of criminal justice by means of the ordinary legislative procedure.

== Legal basis ==
The legal basis for framework decisions was Article 34 of the Treaty on European Union. As amended by the Treaty of Nice and before being repealed by the Lisbon Treaty this Article read:

Article 34

2. The Council shall take measures and promote cooperation, using the appropriate form and procedures as set out in this title, contributing to the pursuit of the objectives of the Union. To that end, acting unanimously on the initiative of any Member State or of the Commission, the Council may:

...

(b) adopt framework decisions for the purpose of approximation of the laws and regulations of the Member States. Framework decisions shall be binding upon the Member States as to the result to be achieved but shall leave to the national authorities the choice of form and methods. They shall not entail direct effect; ...

The continued basis for framework decisions is set out in transitional provisions of the Lisbon Treaty. Article 9 of the Protocol on Transitional Provisions provides that:

The legal effects of the acts of the institutions, bodies, offices and agencies of the Union adopted on the basis of the Treaty on European Union prior to the entry into force of the Treaty of Lisbon shall be preserved until those acts are repealed, annulled or amended in implementation of the Treaties. The same shall apply to agreements concluded between Member States on the basis of the Treaty on European Union.

== Jurisdiction of the European Court of Justice ==
The European Court of Justice only had jurisdiction to make preliminary rulings on the interpretation of framework decisions when a member state made a declaration under the (pre-Lisbon) Treaty on European Union indicating the circumstances in which the Court could exercise such a jurisdiction. All member states except Ireland and the United Kingdom made such a declaration.

The European Commission could not bring enforcement proceedings against member states for failing to implement a framework decision or for implementing it incorrectly, although the Court did have jurisdiction to resolve disagreements between member states concerning the interpretation of framework decisions and to hear annulment proceedings regarding their validity.

As of the coming into force of the Lisbon Treaty the status quo ante regarding preliminary rulings and enforcement proceedings were preserved for a transitional period of five years although this transitional period ceases to apply to a framework decision which has been amended after the Lisbon's coming into force. Since the transitional period expired on 30 November 2014, preliminary rulings and enforcement proceedings have become possible.

=== United Kingdom opt-out ===
However, the United Kingdom negotiated an opt-out from the continued legal force of framework decisions which it may put into effect no later that six months before the expiry of the transitional period by so notifying the Council of the European Union. In October 2012 the UK government announced that it intended to exercise this opt-out and then selectively opt back into certain measures. Unless this decision is reversed, all framework decisions which are not amended during the transitional period but which are still in force ceased to apply to the UK from 1 December 2014.

== List of framework decisions ==
The following is an exhaustive list the 34 framework decision which were adopted between 1999 and 2009:

- Council Framework Decision 2000/383/JHA of 29 May 2000 on increasing protection by criminal penalties and other sanctions against counterfeiting in connection with the introduction of the euro (OJ L 140, 14.6.2000, pp. 1–3).
  - replaced by Directive 2014/62/EU of the European Parliament and of the Council
- Council Framework Decision 2001/220/JHA of 15 March 2001 on the standing of victims in criminal proceedings (OJ L 82, 22.3.2001, pp. 1–4).
  - replaced by Directive 2012/29/EU of the European Parliament and of the Council
- Council Framework Decision 2001/413/JHA of 28 May 2001 combating fraud and counterfeiting of non-cash means of payment (OJ L 149, 2.6.2001, pp. 1–4).
  - replaced by Directive (EU) 2019/713 of the European Parliament and of the Council
- Council Framework Decision 2001/500/JHA of 26 June 2001 on money laundering, the identification, tracing, freezing, seizing and confiscation of instrumentalities and the proceeds of crime (OJ L 182, 5.7.2001, pp. 1–2).
  - certain provisions replaced by Directive 2014/42/EU of the European Parliament and of the Council and Directive (EU) 2018/1673 of the European Parliament and of the Council
- Council Framework Decision 2001/888/JHA of 6 December 2001 amending Framework Decision 2000/383/JHA on increasing protection by criminal penalties and other sanctions against counterfeiting in connection with the introduction of the euro (OJ L 329, 14.12.2001, pp. 3–3).
  - implicitly repealed by Directive 2014/62/EU
- Council Framework Decision 2002/584/JHA of 13 June 2002 on the European arrest warrant and the surrender procedures between Member States – Statements made by certain Member States on the adoption of the Framework Decision (OJ L 190, 18.7.2002, pp. 1–20).
- Council Framework Decision 2002/475/JHA of 13 June 2002 on combating terrorism (OJ L 164, 22.6.2002, pp. 3–7).
  - replaced by Directive (EU) 2017/541 of the European Parliament and of the Council
- Council Framework Decision 2002/465/JHA of 13 June 2002 on joint investigation teams (OJ L 162, 20.6.2002, pp. 1–3).
- Council Framework Decision 2002/629/JHA of 19 July 2002 on combating trafficking in human beings (OJ L 203, 1.8.2002, pp. 1–4).
  - replaced by Directive 2011/36/EU of the European Parliament and of the Council
- Council Framework Decision 2002/946/JHA of 28 November 2002 on the strengthening of the penal framework to prevent the facilitation of unauthorised entry, transit and residence (OJ L 328, 5.12.2002, pp. 1–3).
- Council Framework Decision 2003/80/JHA of 7 January 2003 on the protection of the environment through criminal law (OJ L 29, 5.2.2003, pp. 55–58).
  - invalidated by Case C-176/03, certain provisions subsequently adopted in Directive 2008/99/EC of the European Parliament and of the Council
- Council Framework Decision 2003/568/JHA of 22 July 2003 on combating corruption in the private sector (OJ L 192, 31.7.2003, pp. 54–56).
  - replaced by Directive (EU) 2026/1021 of the European Parliament and of the Council
- Council Framework Decision 2003/577/JHA of 22 July 2003 on the execution in the European Union of orders freezing property or evidence (OJ L 196, 2.8.2003, pp. 45–55).
  - replaced by Regulation (EU) 2018/1805 of the European Parliament and of the Council
- Council Framework Decision 2004/68/JHA of 22 December 2003 on combating the sexual exploitation of children and child pornography (OJ L 13, 20.1.2004, pp. 44–48).
  - replaced by Directive 2011/93/EU of the European Parliament and of the Council
- Council Framework Decision 2004/757/JHA of 25 October 2004 laying down minimum provisions on the constituent elements of criminal acts and penalties in the field of illicit drug trafficking (OJ L 335, 11.11.2004, pp. 8–11).
- Council Framework Decision 2005/212/JHA of 24 February 2005 on Confiscation of Crime-Related Proceeds, Instrumentalities and Property (OJ L 68, 15.3.2005, pp. 49–51).
  - certain provisions replaced by Directive 2014/42/EU of the European Parliament and of the Council
- Council Framework Decision 2005/214/JHA of 24 February 2005 on the application of the principle of mutual recognition to financial penalties (OJ L 76, 22.3.2005, pp. 16–30).
- Council Framework Decision 2005/222/JHA of 24 February 2005 on attacks against information systems (OJ L 69, 16.3.2005, pp. 67–71).
  - replaced by Directive 2013/40/EU of the European Parliament and of the Council
- Council Framework Decision 2005/667/JHA of 12 July 2005 to strengthen the criminal-law framework for the enforcement of the law against ship-source pollution (OJ L 255, 30.9.2005, pp. 164–167).
  - invalidated by Case C-440/05, certain provisions subsequently adopted in Directive 2009/123/EC of the European Parliament and of the Council
- Council Framework Decision 2006/783/JHA of 6 October 2006 on the application of the principle of mutual recognition to confiscation orders (OJ L 328, 24.11.2006, pp. 59–78).
  - replaced by Regulation (EU) 2018/1805 of the European Parliament and of the Council
- Council Framework Decision 2006/960/JHA of 18 December 2006 on simplifying the exchange of information and intelligence between law enforcement authorities of the Member States of the European Union (OJ L 386, 29.12.2006, pp. 89–100).
  - repealed by Directive (EU) 2023/977 of the European Parliament and of the Council
- Council Framework Decision 2008/675/JHA of 24 July 2008 on taking account of convictions in the Member States of the European Union in the course of new criminal proceedings (OJ L 220, 15.8.2008, pp. 32–34).
- Council Framework Decision 2008/841/JHA of 24 October 2008 on the fight against organised crime (OJ L 300, 11.11.2008, pp. 42–45).
- Council Framework Decision 2008/909/JHA of 27 November 2008 on the application of the principle of mutual recognition to judgments in criminal matters imposing custodial sentences or measures involving deprivation of liberty for the purpose of their enforcement in the European Union (OJ L 327, 5.12.2008, pp. 27–46).
- Council Framework Decision 2008/947/JHA of 27 November 2008 on the application of the principle of mutual recognition to judgments and probation decisions with a view to the supervision of probation measures and alternative sanctions (OJ L 337, 16.12.2008, pp. 102–122).
- Council Framework Decision 2008/977/JHA of 27 November 2008 on the protection of personal data processed in the framework of police and judicial co-operation in criminal matters (OJ L 350, 30.12.2008, pp. 60–71).
  - repealed by Directive (EU) 2016/680 of the European Parliament and of the Council
- Council Framework Decision 2008/913/JHA of 28 November 2008 on combating certain forms and expressions of racism and xenophobia by means of criminal law (OJ L 328, 6.12.2008, pp. 55–58).
- Council Framework Decision 2008/919/JHA of 28 November 2008 amending Framework Decision 2002/475/JHA on combating terrorism (OJ L 330, 9.12.2008, pp. 21–23).
  - implicitly repealed by Directive (EU) 2017/541 of the European Parliament and of the Council
- Council Framework Decision 2008/978/JHA of 18 December 2008 on the European evidence warrant for the purpose of obtaining objects, documents and data for use in proceedings in criminal matters (OJ L 350, 30.12.2008, pp. 72–92).
  - repealed by Regulation (EU) 2016/95 of the European Parliament and of the Council
- Council Framework Decision 2009/299/JHA of 26 February 2009 amending Framework Decisions 2002/584/JHA, 2005/214/JHA, 2006/783/JHA, 2008/909/JHA and 2008/947/JHA, thereby enhancing the procedural rights of persons and fostering the application of the principle of mutual recognition to decisions rendered in the absence of the person concerned at the trial (OJ L 81, 27.3.2009, pp. 24–36).
- Council Framework Decision 2009/315/JHA of 26 February 2009 on the organisation and content of the exchange of information extracted from the criminal record between Member States (OJ L 93, 7.4.2009, pp. 23–32).
- Council Framework Decision 2009/829/JHA of 23 October 2009 on the application, between Member States of the European Union, of the principle of mutual recognition to decisions on supervision measures as an alternative to provisional detention (OJ L 294, 11.11.2009, pp. 20–40).
- Council Framework Decision 2009/905/JHA of 30 November 2009 on Accreditation of forensic service providers carrying out laboratory activities (OJ L 322, 9.12.2009, pp. 14–16).
- Council Framework Decision 2009/948/JHA of 30 November 2009 on prevention and settlement of conflicts of exercise of jurisdiction in criminal proceedings (OJ L 328, 15.12.2009, pp. 42–47).

== See also ==
- Directive
- Regulation
