= Regulation of therapeutic goods =

Legal management of drugs and restricted substances

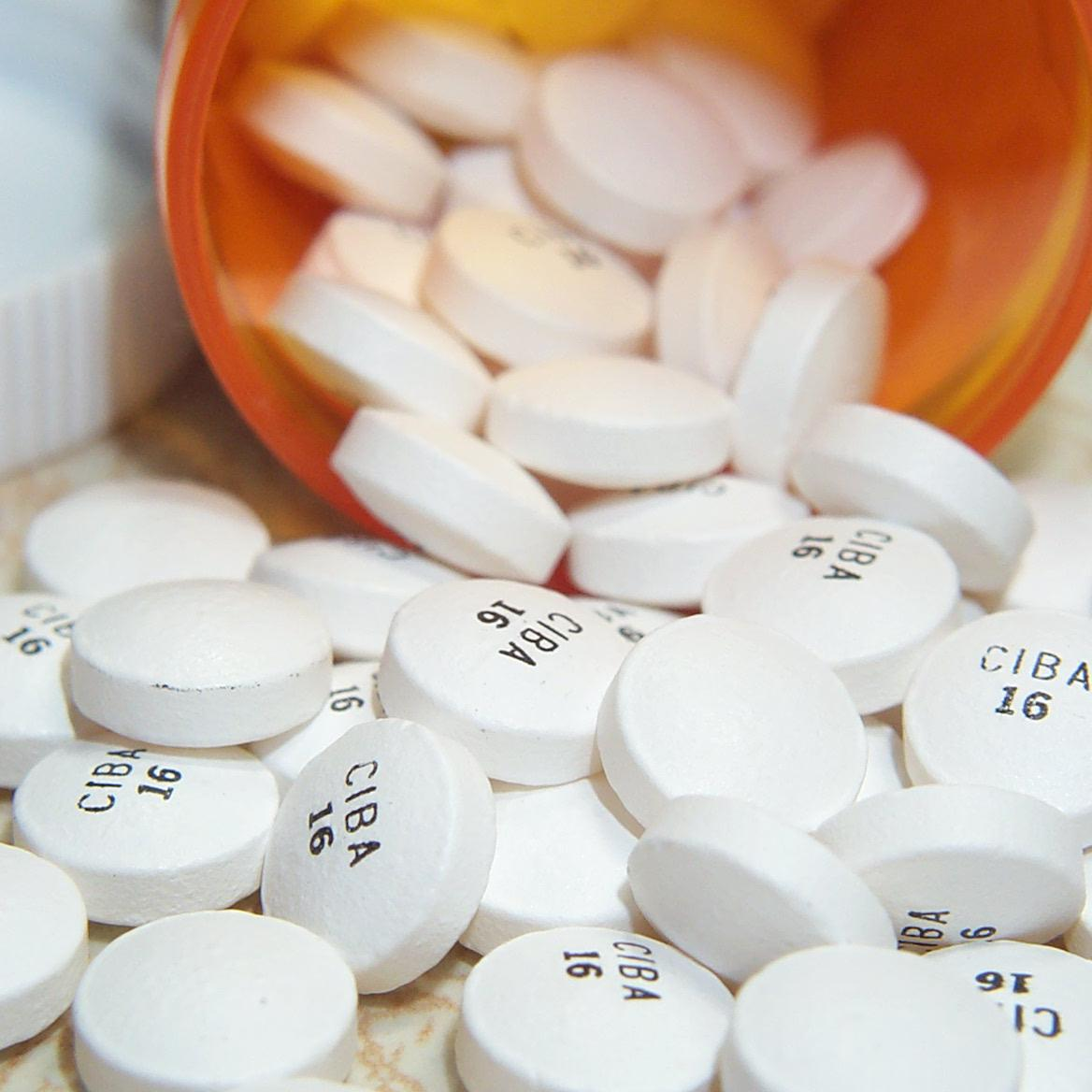
Methylphenidate, in the form of Ritalin pills

The regulation of therapeutic goods, defined as drugs and therapeutic devices, varies by jurisdiction. In some countries, such as the United States, they are regulated at the national level by a single agency. In other jurisdictions they are regulated at the state level, or at both state and national levels by various bodies, as in Australia.

The primary purpose of therapeutic goods regulation is to protect public health and safety by ensuring that products within its scope meet standards of safety, quality, and efficacy. In most jurisdictions, therapeutic goods must be registered before they are allowed to be sold. There is usually some degree of restriction on the availability of certain therapeutic goods, depending on their risk to consumers.

== History ==
Modern drug regulation has historical roots in the response to the proliferation of universal antidotes which appeared in the wake of Mithridates' death. Mithridates had brought together physicians, scientists, and shamans to concoct a potion that would make him immune to poisons. Following his death, the Romans became keen on further developing the Mithridates potion's recipe. Mithridatium re-entered western society through multiple means. The first was through the Leechbook of the Bald (Bald's Leechbook), written somewhere between 900 and 950, which contained a formula for various remedies, including for a theriac. Additionally, theriac became a commercial good traded throughout Europe based on the works of Greek and Roman physicians.

The resulting proliferation of various recipes needed to be curtailed in order to ensure that people were not passing off fake antidotes, which led to the development of government involvement and regulation. Additionally, the creation of these concoctions took on ritualistic form and were often created in public and the process was observed and recorded. It was believed that if the concoction proved unsuccessful, it was due to the apothecaries' process of making them and they could be held accountable because of the public nature of the creation.

In the ninth century, many Muslim countries established an office of the hisba, which in addition to regulating compliance to Islamic principles and values took on the role of regulating other aspects of social and economic life, including the regulation of medicines. Inspectors were appointed to employ oversight on those who were involved in the process of medicine creation and were given a lot of leeway to ensure compliance and punishments were stringent. The first official "act", the "Apothecary Wares, Drugs and Stuffs" Act (also sometimes referred to as the "Pharmacy Wares, Drugs and Stuffs" Act) was passed in 1540 by Henry VIII and set the foundation for others. Through this act, he encouraged physicians in his College of Physicians (founded by him in 1518) to appoint four people dedicated to consistently inspecting what was being sold in apothecary shops. In conjunction with this first piece of legislation, there was an emergence of standard formulas for the creation of certain "drugs" and "antidotes" through Pharmacopoeias which first appeared in the form of a decree from Frederick II of Sicily in 1240 to use consistent and standard formulas. The first modern pharmacopoeias were the Florence Pharmacopoeia published in 1498, the Spanish Pharmacopoeia published in 1581 and the London Pharmacopoeia published in 1618.

Various other events throughout history have demonstrated the importance of drug and medicine regulation keeping up with scientific advances. In 2006, the challenges associated with TGN 1412 highlighted the shortcomings of animal models and paved the way for further advances in regulation and development for biological products. Rofecoxib represents a drug that was on the market that had not clearly represent the risks associated with the use drug which led to the concept of "risk management planning" within the field of regulation by introducing the need to understand how various safety concerns would be managed. Various cases over recent years have demonstrated the need for regulation to keep up with scientific advances that have implications for people's health.

=== United States ===
In the United States, regulation of drugs was originally a state right, as opposed to federal right. But with the increase in fraudulent practices due to private incentives to maximize profits and poor enforcement of state laws, the need for stronger federal regulation increased. In 1906 President Roosevelt signed the Federal Food and Drug Act (FFDA) which both established stricter national standards for drug manufacture and sales, and also established the Federal government as the regulating authority over the US drug industry. A 1911 Supreme Court decision, United States vs. Johnson, established that misleading statements were not covered under the FFDA. This directly led to Congress passing the Sherley Amendment which established a clearer definition of 'drug marketing requirements'.

More catalysts for advances in drug regulation in the US were certain catastrophes that served as calls to the US government to step in and impose regulations that would prevent repeats of those instances. One such instance occurred in 1937 when more than a hundred people died from using sulfanilamide elixir which had not gone through any safety testing. This directly led to the passing of the Federal, Food, Drug, and Cosmetic Act in 1938. One other major catastrophe occurred in the late 1950s when Thalidomide, which was originally sold in Germany (introduced into a virtually unregulated market) and eventually sold around the world, led to approximately 100,000 babies being born with various deformities. In 1962 the United States Congress passed the Drug Amendments Act of 1962. The Drug Amendments Act required the FDA to ensure that new drugs being introduced to the market had passed certain tests and standards.

=== United Kingdom ===
The UK's Chief Medical Officer had established a group to look into safety of drugs on the market in 1959 prior to the crisis and was moving in the direction of address the problem of unregulated drugs entering the market. The crisis created a greater sense of emergency to establish safety and efficacy standards around the world. The UK started a temporary Committee on Safety of Drugs while they attempted to pass more comprehensive legislation. Though compliance and submission of drugs to the Committee on Safety of Drugs was not mandatory immediately after, the pharmaceutical industry later complied due to the thalidomide situation.

=== European Economic Union ===
The European Economic Commission also passed a directive in 1965 in order to impose greater efficacy standards before marketing a drug. Drug legislation in both the EU and US were passed in order to assure drug safety and efficacy. Of note, increased regulations and standards for testing actually led to greater innovation in pharmaceutical research in the 1960s, despite greater preclinical and clinical standards. In 1989, the International Conference of Drug Regulatory Authorities organized by the WHO, officials from around the world discussed the necessity for streamlined processes for global drug approval.

== Regulatory authorities and key legislation by country ==
=== Australia ===
Therapeutic goods in Australia are regulated by the Therapeutic Goods Administration (TGA), which is a regulatory body of the Commonwealth Department of Health. Access to medicines and poisons is regulated by the separation of substances into various schedules according to the Therapeutic Goods (Poisons Standard) Instrument, the Poisons Standard may also be cited as the Standard for the Uniform Scheduling of Medicines and Poisons (SUSMP).

The Poisons Standard organises substances into 10 schedules (and unscheduled substances), therapeutic goods are generally organised only into schedules 2, 3, 4 and 8:

- unscheduled substances: unscheduled substances are available for purchase at any retailer.
- schedule 1 (S1) - Blank: this schedule is left intentionally blank.
- schedule 2 (S2) - Pharmacy medicines: substances in schedule 2 are only available for purchase in a pharmacy or other licensed retailer.
- schedule 3 (S3) - Pharmacist only medicines: substances in schedule 3 are only available for purchase in a pharmacy and a pharmacist must be involved in the sale of the medicine.
- schedule 4 (S4) - Prescription only medicines and prescription animal remedies: substances in schedule 4 are only available with a prescription from a prescriber (medical practitioners, dentists, nurse practitioners, endorsed physiotherapists and podiatrists) and must be purchased at a pharmacy.
- schedule 5 (S5) - Caution
- schedule 6 (S6) - Poisons
- schedule 7 (S7) - Dangerous Poisons
- schedule 8 (S8) - Controlled drugs: substances in schedule 8 are generally drugs of addiction or dependence and are only available with a prescription from an authorised prescriber, they must be purchased at a pharmacy. Schedule 8 medicines have additional controls on their storage, supply, possession, destruction and prescription compared to schedule 4 substances.
- schedule 9 (S9) - Prohibited substances
- schedule 10 (S10) - Substances of such danger to health as to warrant prohibition of supply and use

=== Brazil ===
Therapeutic goods in Brazil are regulated by the Ministry of Health of Brazil, through its Brazilian Health Regulatory Agency (Anvisa), equivalent to the US Food and Drug Administration. There are six main categories:

- Over-the-counter (OTC) medicines (medicamentos isentos de prescrição or MIPs in Portuguese): cough, cold and fever medicines, antiseptics, vitamins and others. Sold freely in pharmacies.
- Red stripe medicines: sold only with medical prescription. Anti-allergenics, anti-inflammatories, and other medicines.
- Red stripe antibiotics: antibiotics are sold only with a "special control" white medical prescription with patient's copy, which is valid for 10 days. The original must be retained by the pharmacist after the sale and the patient keeps the copy.
- Red stripe psychoactive medicines: sold only with a "special control" white medical prescription with patient's copy, which is valid for 30 days. The original must be retained by the pharmacist after the sale and the patient keeps the copy. Drugs include anti-depressants, anti-convulsants, some sleep aids, anti-psychotics and other non-habit-inducing controlled medicines. Though some consider them habit inducing, anabolic steroids are also regulated under this category.
- Black stripe medicines: sold only with the "blue B form" medical prescription, which is valid for 30 days and must be retained by the pharmacist after the sale. Includes sedatives (benzodiazepines), some anorexic inducers and other habit-inducing controlled medicines.
- "Yellow A form" prescription medicines: sold only with the "yellow A form" medical prescription - the most tightly controlled, which is valid for 30 days and must be retained by the pharmacist after the sale. Includes amphetamines and other stimulants (such as methylphenidate), opioids (such as morphine and oxycodone) and other strong habit-forming controlled medicines.

Biological medications are complex molecules of high molecular weight obtained from a biological source or biotechnological procedures and are divided by Anvisa into the following categories:

- Allergens: substances from animals or plants that can induce an IgE response or a type I hypersensitivity reaction
- Monoclonal antibodies: immunoglobulins derived from the same B lymphocyte clone, propagated in continuous cell lines
- Biomedicines: obtained from biological fluids or tissues of animal origin or through biotechnological procedures
- Blood derivatives: obtained from human plasma, subjected to industrialization and standardization processes
- Probiotics: preparations containing viable microorganisms in sufficient quantity to change the microbiota
- Vaccines: immunobiological medications that contain one or more antigenic substances capable of inducing immunity to protect against disease, reduce its severity or fight it

The regulatory status of vaccines, which determines their marketing and distribution, may be one of the following established by Anvisa:

- Sanitary vaccine registration: definitive, for approved drugs
- Temporary emergency use authorization: similar to a US Emergency Use Authorization
- Exceptional import authorization
- COVAX Facility: temporarily lifts the requirement of registration or emergency use authorization for vaccines purchased by the Ministry of Health that are under the Emergency Use Listing of the World Health Organization

Vaccines can only be administered in public health centers or authorized private vaccination services.

=== Canada ===
In Canada, regulation of therapeutic goods is done by Health Canada and governed by the Food and Drug Act and associated regulations. In addition, the Controlled Drugs and Substances Act specifies additional regulatory requirements for controlled drugs and drug precursors.

In Ontario, the Drug and Pharmacies Regulation Act governs "any substance that is used in the diagnosis, treatment, mitigation or prevention of a disease... in humans, animals or fowl."

=== China ===
The regulation of drugs in China is governed by the National Medical Products Administration (NMPA) which replaced the former China Food and Drug Administration.

=== Egypt ===
The regulation of drugs in Egypt is governed by the Egyptian Drug Authority (EDA)

=== European Union ===
The European Union (EU) medicines regulatory system is based on a network of around 50 regulatory authorities from the 31 EEA countries (28 EU Member States plus Iceland, Liechtenstein and Norway), the European Commission and European Medicines Agency (EMA). EMA and the Member States cooperate and share expertise in the assessment of new medicines and of new safety information. They also rely on each other for exchange of information in the regulation of medicine, for example regarding the reporting of side effects of medicines, the oversight of clinical trials, and the conduct of inspections of medicines' manufacturers and compliance with good clinical practice (GCP), good manufacturing practice (GMP), good distribution practice (GDP), and good pharmacovigilance practice (GVP). EU legislation requires that each Member State operates to the same rules and requirements regarding the authorisation and monitoring of medicines.

Within the EU, EudraLex maintains the collection of rules and regulations governing medicinal products in the European Union, and the European Medicines Agency acts to regulate many of these rules and regulations. Amongst these rules and regulations are:

- Directive 65/65/EEC1, requires prior approval for marketing of proprietary medicinal products
- Directive 75/318/EEC, clarifies requirements of 65/65/EEC1 and requires member states to enforce them
- Directive 75/319/EEC, requires marketing authorization requests to be drawn up only by qualified experts
- Directive 93/41/EEC, establishes the European Agency for the Evaluation of Medicinal Products
- Directive 2001/20/EC, defines rules for the conduct of clinical trials
- Directive 2001/83/EC
- Directive 2005/28/EC, defines Good Clinical Practice for design and conduct of clinical trials

=== Germany ===
German law classifies drugs into

- Narcotics ("Betäubungsmittel")
  - Anlage I BTMG (authorized scientific use only)
  - Anlage II BTMG (authorized trade only, not prescriptible)
  - Anlage III BTMG (special prescription form required – "Betäubungsmittelrezept")
- Research chemicals ("neue psychoaktive Stoffe" – permitted only for industrial and scientific purposes)
- Prescription drugs ("verschreibungspflichtig" or "rezeptpflichtig")
- Pharmacy-only drugs ("apothekenpflichtig")
- General sales list drugs ("freiverkäuflich")
- Raw materials for synthesizing drugs
  - Kategorie 1 (authorization required)
  - Kategorie 2 (reporting required)
  - Kategorie 3 (export restrictions)

=== Iceland ===
Medicines in Iceland are regulated by the Icelandic Medicines Control Agency.

=== India ===
Medicines in India are regulated by Central Drugs Standard Control Organization (CDSCO) Under Ministry of Health and Family Welfare. Headed by Directorate General of Health Services(India).CDSCO regulates pharmaceutical products through Drugs Controller General of India (DCGI) at chair.

Drugs are classified under five headings. Under retail and distribution:

- Schedule X drugs - narcotics
- Schedule H and L - injectables, antibiotics, antibacterials
- Schedule C and C1 - biological products, for example serums and vaccines

Under manufacturing practice:

- Schedule N - list of the equipment for the efficient running of manufacturing wing, qualified personnel
- Schedule M

=== Indonesia ===
Medicines in Indonesia are regulated by National Agency of Drug and Food Control of Indonesia. Drugs in Indonesia are classified into:

- Over-the-counter (OTC) drug (Obat bebas), drugs freely available to the public. Marked by green circle with black line.
- Limited OTC drug (Obat bebas terbatas), drugs available to the public only through pharmacy (apotek) or licensed drug stores. Marked by blue circle with black line.
- Prescription drug (Obat keras), prescription only medicine. Marked by red circle with letter "K" inside circle and black line.
- Narcotics and psychoactive drugs (Obat psikotropika dan narkotika). National Narcotics Board perform law enforcement measure at illegal drug abuse and drug trafficking.

=== Ireland ===
Medicines in Ireland are regulated according to the Misuse of Drugs Regulations 1988. Controlled drugs (CDs) are divided into five categories based on their potential for misuse and therapeutic effectiveness.

- CD1: cannabis, lysergamide, coca leaf, etc. Use is prohibited except in limited circumstances where a license has been granted.
- CD2: amphetamine, methadone, morphine, fentanyl, oxycodone, tapentadol, etc. Prescriptions must be handwritten and are only valid for 14 days. Repeat prescriptions are not permitted. Drugs must comply with safe custody and destruction of unsold/unused medication must be witnessed. Must be registered in a Controlled Drugs register.
- CD3: temazepam, flunitrazepam, etc. As CD2, except witnessed destruction and CD register are not required.
- CD4: benzodiazepines, e.g. diazepam, nitrazepam, low dose (methyl)phenobarbitone
- CD5: low-dose codeine, etc.

=== Myanmar (Burma) ===
The regulation of drugs in Burma is governed by the Food and Drug Administration (Burma) and Food and Drug Board of Authority.

=== Norway ===
Medicines in Norway are regulated by the Norwegian Medical Products Agency. Drugs are divided into five groups:

Class A

Narcotics, sedative-hypnotics, and amphetamines in this class require a special prescription form:

- morphine and its immediate family, heroin, desomorphine, nicomorphine;
- codeine and its immediate family, dihydrocodeine, ethylmorphine, nicocodeine;
- morphine relatives: hydromorphone and oxymorphone;
- codeine relatives: hydrocodone and oxycodone;
- synthetic opioids: pethidine, methadone, fentanyl, and levorphanol;
- various sedative-hypnotics: temazepam, methaqualone, pentobarbital, and secobarbital;
- various stimulants: amphetamines and methylphenidate;
- flunitrazepam (moved from class B)

Class B

Restricted substances which easily lead to addiction like: co-codamol, tramadol, diazepam, nitrazepam and all other benzodiazepines (with the exception of temazepam and flunitrazepam) phentermine.

Class C - All prescription-only substances

Class F - Substances and package-sizes not requiring a prescription

Unclassifieds - Brands and packages not actively marketed in Norway

=== Philippines ===
The Food and Drug Administration regulates drugs and medical devices in the Philippines.

=== Sri Lanka ===
Prohibited. Brands and packages not actively marketed in Sri Lanka.

=== Switzerland ===
Medicines in Switzerland are regulated by Swissmedic. The country is not part of the European Union, and is regarded by many as one of the easiest places to conduct clinical trials on new drug compounds.

There are five categories from A to E to cover different types of delivery category:

- A: Supply once with a prescription from a doctor or veterinarian
- B: Supply with a prescription from a doctor or veterinarian
- C: Supply on technical advice from medical staff
- D: Supply on technical advice
- E: Supply without technical advice

=== United Kingdom ===
Medicines for Human Use in the United Kingdom are regulated by the Medicines and Healthcare products Regulatory Agency (MHRA). The availability of drugs is regulated by classification by the MHRA as part of marketing authorisation of a product.

The United Kingdom has a three-tiered classification system:

- General Sale List (GSL)
- Pharmacy medicines (P)
- Prescription Only Medicines (POM)

Within POM, certain agents with a high abuse/addiction liability are also separately scheduled under the Misuse of Drugs Act 1971 (amended with the Misuse of Drugs Regulations 2001); and are commonly known as Controlled Drugs (CD).

=== United States ===
Therapeutic goods in the United States are regulated by the U.S. Food and Drug Administration (FDA), which makes some drugs available over the counter (OTC) at retail outlets and others by prescription only.

The prescription or possession of some substances is controlled or prohibited by the Controlled Substances Act, under the FDA and the Drug Enforcement Administration (DEA). Some US states apply more stringent limits on the prescription of certain controlled substances C-V and BTC (behind the counter) drugs such as pseudoephedrine. Three primary branches of pharmacovigilance in the U.S. include the FDA, the pharmaceutical manufacturers, and the academic/non-profit organizations (such as RADAR and Public Citizen).

== See also ==
- Council for International Organizations of Medical Sciences (CIOMS, WHO)
- Counterfeit drug
- Drug Efficacy Study Implementation (DESI)
- Drug policy and Drug prohibition law
- International Conference on Harmonisation of Technical Requirements for Registration of Pharmaceuticals for Human Use
- Inverse benefit law
- List of stringent regulatory authorities
- Over-the-counter drug
- Prescription drug
- Uppsala Monitoring Centre (WHO)
- Validation (drug manufacture)
- World Health Organization
- Legal drug trade
- Illegal drug trade
