= Electronic trial master file =

Electronically formatted trial master file

An electronic trial master file (eTMF) is a trial master file in electronic (digital content) format. It is a type of content management system for the pharmaceutical industry, providing a formalized means of organizing and storing documents, images, and other digital content for pharmaceutical clinical trials that may be required for compliance with government regulatory agencies. The term eTMF encompasses strategies, methods and tools used throughout the lifecycle of the clinical trial regulated content. An eTMF system consists of software and hardware that facilitates the management of regulated clinical trial content. Regulatory agencies have outlined the required components of eTMF systems that use electronic means to store the content of a clinical trial, requiring that they include: Digital content archiving, security and access control, change controls, audit trails, and system validation.

== History and background ==
In order to comply with government regulatory requirements surrounding BioPharma clinical trials, every organization involved in regulated clinical trials must maintain and store certain 'essential documents' related to the clinical trial to ensure regulatory compliance. Depending on the regulatory jurisdiction, this information is typically stored in the trial master file or TMF. The TMF has historically been composed primarily of paper documents, images and media captured centrally in physical file cabinets.

In order to lower costs and to expedite the clinical trials approval processes, government agencies involved in regulating clinical trials such as the U.S. Food and Drug Administration (FDA) and the European Medicines Agency (EMA) have been developing technology initiatives. In the U.S., the FDA created regulation CFR 21 Part 11 which supports the use of electronic records, digital media and digital signatures in clinical trials. In Europe, the European Medicines Agency has issued policies that support the use of digital signatures in clinical trials.

In clinical trials and healthcare, enterprises with manual paper-based systems are seeking to transition to automated electronic enterprise content management (ECM) systems to ensure higher levels of regulatory compliance for reduced business risk. As a result of the FDA's Part 11 policy supporting the use of electronic records and digital signatures in lieu of paper, US organizations involved in U.S. clinical trials can move from a paper-based TMF to an electronic TMF (eTMF), and still be in compliance with FDA regulatory policies.

== Definition ==
The definition of what comprises an eTMF is defined by the regulatory agency with jurisdiction over the clinical trial. In Europe, the EMA has recently defined an eTMF as follows: 'An eTMF can contain digital documents in their original format, potentially with digital signatures, or records that have been converted from another format, such as paper documents that have been converted to digital images, which may contain wet-ink signatures. The metadata applied to documents is recommended be formally defined to ensure consistency across all documents.' At the time of this article no formal US FDA requirement exists for the use of an eTMF system in a clinical trial. However, if a clinical trial elects to store trial master file 'essential documents' in electronic format, then the eTMF system used to store those files is subject to regulatory controls specified under FDA Title 21 CFR Part 11.

== Required components of an eTMF system ==
With respect to the FDA, the required components, controls and policies for an eTMF used in US based clinical trials follow US FDA CFR 21 Part 11 requirements. In August 2003, the FDA issued additional guidance to the industry that outlines the required components, controls, policies and validation required for electronic systems and electronic signatures. According to the FDA, systems used to store electronic records or documents are generally subject to the following controls and requirements:

- Limiting system access to authorized individuals
- Use of operational system checks
- Use of authority checks
- Use of device checks
- Determination that persons who develop, maintain, or use electronic systems have the education, training, and experience to perform their assigned tasks
- Establishment of and adherence to written policies that hold individuals accountable for actions initiated under their electronic signatures
- Appropriate controls over systems documentation
- Controls for open systems corresponding to controls for closed systems bulleted above (§ 11.30)
- Requirements related to electronic signatures (e.g., §§ 11.50, 11.70, 11.100, 11.200, and 11.300)
- Record Audit trail (timestamping of records)
- Record export to a portable format such as PDF or XML
- Validation of the system (11.10 (a))

Although the FDA and other regulatory agencies have defined the requirements for electronic document and record systems that store clinical trial essential documents, no government agency has defined how eTMF content should be classified, or the standards for metadata that may used in content indexing, or the electronic format(s) that should be used to model, store or exchange eTMF data. As a result of the lack of a standard to represent eTMF content, eTMF information interoperability and content exchange between systems and applications is inefficient.

== eTMF standards initiative ==
In an effort to assure interoperability of eTMF data among clinical trial stakeholders, in September 2013 non-profit CareLex and SureClinical initiated an eTMF standards initiative under the OASIS open standards development organization for the development of a global eTMF standard. The initiative, known as the OASIS eTMF Standard Technical Committee, has a stated objective to "define an open, internationally recognized standard that will assure information interoperability among clinical trial stakeholders in the BioPharma industry." According to minutes from the OASIS eTMF Standard Technical Committee (TC), the standards initiative is coordinating the efforts of clinical trial sponsors, CRO’s (Contract Research Organizations), academic research organizations, and vendors to develop an ISO standard.

As of July 2014, a list of members in the OASIS eTMF Standard TC includes CareLex, Forte Research, Fujitsu, HL7, Mayo Clinic, NextDocs (since acquired by Aurea), Oracle, Paragon Solutions (since acquired by CGI), Phlexglobal, SAFE-BioPharma, SterlingBio, and SureClinical.

Information on the charter for the OASIS eTMF Standard TC is available for download through OASIS. Membership in the OASIS eTMF Standard TC was opened to anyone in September 2013; membership in the OASIS eTMF Standard TC remains open to anyone who wishes to join and the work of the TC is open to public comment and review. All work of the OASIS eTMF standard TC is available freely under OASIS open source IPR policies. The eTMF Technical Committee closed on 17 November 2017 without publishing a standard and is no longer active.

In June 2018, the TMF Reference Model project team published a specification [8] and an example XML exchange file [9] for an eTMF Exchange Mechanism Standard [10] at the DIA Global Meeting in Boston, USA. Use of this standard will help facilitate the exchange of TMF content between systems.

== Recent developments ==
In February 2013, the EMA (European Medicines Agency) created a draft guideline document that recognizes the importance and legal equivalence of the TMF and the eTMF, and provided guidance to organizations implementing TMFs and eTMF systems. In the guideline document, EMA inspectors state that paper TMF documents may be stored in electronic eTMF systems, and after this process, that the paper may be destroyed. The use of eTMF systems for electronic storage is fully supported by the EMA in clinical trials as a replacement for paper. In a cautionary statement, the agency cites quality problems with TMFs and eTMFs due to document quality and discrepancies such as missing pages, improper labeling or missing documents.

A recent study shows that the adoption of eTMF solutions is accelerating - with more than 50% of investigative site expected to have access to a sponsor/CRO eTMF application within three years.
