= Special prescription form =

Form for the prescription of controlled narcotics

Special prescription forms, sometimes called narcotic prescription forms, controlled prescription forms, psychotropic prescription forms or triplicate prescription forms (because they often have to be signed in triplicate) are forms required in some countries for the prescription of controlled narcotics and other psychotropic substances, for which a standard medical prescription is not sufficient. They exist at least in Germany, the United Arab Emirates, Saudi Arabia, India, Russia, Australia, Norway, Canada, Poland, Brazil and some US states. While a medical practitioner can typically issue a normal prescription on forms of their own choice, special prescription forms are distributed and controlled by government authorities.

== See also ==
- Regulation of therapeutic goods
