= Trial master file =

In order to comply with government regulatory requirements pertinent to clinical trials, every organization involved in clinical trials must maintain and store certain documents, images and content related to the clinical trial. Depending on the regulatory jurisdiction, this information may be stored in the Trial Master File or TMF, which today takes the form of an electronic trial master file (eTMF). The International Conference on Harmonization (ICH) published a consolidated guidance for industry on Good Clinical Practice in 1996 with the objective of providing a unified standard for the European Union, Japan, and the United States of America to facilitate mutual acceptance of clinical data by the regulatory authorities in those jurisdictions. This guidance document established the requirement across all ICH regions to establish trial master files containing essential documents that individually and collectively permit evaluation of the conduct of a trial and the quality of the data produced.^{[2]} In some jurisdictions, for example the USA, there is no specific requirement for a trial master file. However, if the regulatory authority requires ICH GCP to be followed, then there is consequently a requirement to create and maintain a trial master file.^{[2]}

== History ==
In a clinical trial involving human subjects, a set of content known as a trial master file (TMF) must be produced in accordance with applicable international and local regulations. TMFs are a collection of documents and other artifacts which "individually and collectively permit evaluation of the conduct of a trial and the quality of the data produced. These documents serve to demonstrate the compliance of the investigator, sponsor and monitor with the standards of Good Clinical Practice and with all applicable regulatory requirements." Historically, TMFs have been paper-based content sets stored in physical file cabinets, central file rooms, or shelved in binders. The size and complexity of a TMF is in direct proportion to the length and complexity of the trial. The TMF is actively built during a trial, and must be maintained during a post-trial period for possible regulatory agency inspection in alignment with GCP and local country regulations. Traditionally, the TMF content names and requirements varies from sponsor to sponsor, creating a high degree of variability and inconsistency.

== TMF definition ==
A trial master file contains essential documents for a clinical trial that may be subject to regulatory agency oversight. In the European Union (EU), TMFs have a different definition and set of requirements than in the US. The EU Commission's Directive 2005/28/EC 63 Chapter 4 states 'the trial master file shall consist of essential documents, which enable both the conduct of a clinical trial and the quality of the data produced to be evaluated. Those documents shall show whether the investigator and the sponsor have complied with the principles and guidelines of good clinical practice and with the applicable requirements.' The US FDA recognizes the use of TMFs as a significant piece of information but unlike the EU with its TMF regulation, there is no formal requirement for maintenance of essential documents in a TMF in US-based clinical trials in the U.S. Code of Federal Regulations. However, since the U.S. FDA require trials to be conducted in compliance with ICH GCP, there is an expectation that a trial master file will be created and maintained in accordance with those guidelines.

== TMF content ==
The United States, the EU and Japan support the International Conference on Harmonisation or ICH. The ICH has published a minimum set of essential documents for the TMF. The minimum essential documents that are required for the registration of pharmaceutical products designed for human use are specified in the document 'ICH Good Clinical Practices,' published in 1997 by the ICH Example ICH essential documents that would be required in any US, EU or Japan based clinical trial would include: signed protocol, audit certificate, subject enrollment log. Although the ICH guidelines are applicable to the three named ICH regions, many other countries have agreed to follow the guidelines and have incorporated the principles into their national medicines legislation. Creation of a TMF and inclusion of ICH essential documents is based on the discretion of the regulatory agency for the country in which the clinical trial is conducted. In addition, the submission of a marketing application will normally require compliance with the regulatory requirements of that country, including requirements specific to TMF content.

== TMF content classification efforts ==
Since the requirement to maintain a TMF containing essential records was documented in the ICH GCP E6 R1 Consolidated Guideline in 1996, trial sponsors have struggled to identify exactly what content the TMF should contain. ICH E6 R1 includes details of only a minimum list of contents and no other regulation or guideline provides a comprehensive list of TMF content. As a result of the inconsistencies in TMF content, a number of groups within industry recognised a need for the development of a standard TMF content list. In 2007, an industry group called the GCP-RMA (Good Clinical Practice Records Managers Association) decided to develop a standard contents list based on clinical trial processes for the TMF but struggled to get traction within industry. Independently, in March 2009, the TMF Reference Model team was formed out of the Document and Records Management Community of the DIA (Drug Information Association) as suggested by the Electronic Document Management (EDM) Reference Model group. The TMF Reference Model team included some members of the EDM Reference Model group, GCP-RMA, the eClinical Forum and other stakeholder groups. With input from a large number of stakeholders, work started on producing the first standardised TMF Structure across the industry.

The first version of the TMF Reference Model (TMF RM)^{[5]} was released on the 10th June 2010 (ref launch presentation) and was updated in February, 2011 (v1.1) based on feedback provided by Regulators, and again in December, 2011 (v1.2), based on feedback provided by users of the model as they used it within their respective organizations to structure their paper and electronic TMFs. TMF Reference Model v2.0 in June 2012 incorporating process-based metadata, an idea that was initially presented by the GCP-RMA at the DIA Document Management Conference in Vienna in December 2009. v2.0 also included other expansions to the reference model. Artifacts, the term used for content types, were added for Investigator Site Files, Device trials, and Investigator Initiated Studies.

In June 2015 v3.0 of the TMF Reference Model was published. v3.0 includes provision for sub-classification of artifacts; identified as sub-artifacts. Section 01.03 (Trial Committees) was revised to provide additional flexibility, allowing for limitless numbers of committees to be managed within a TMF with a common classification structure. It also included 12 new artifacts, 8 removed artifacts and 1 re-classified artifact. The DIA states on their website 'The TMF Reference Model provides an opportunity for standardization across the industry, and can be used by any company in an electronic or paper format'.^{[5]} Whilst the DIA doesn't have a formal, public and open standards effort in place to develop a formal, published standard, the use of the Reference Model is helping industry to standardize on the content of the trial master file, on the nomenclature for trial master file artifacts and on the taxonomy used. For clarification purposes, there was initially no intention by the DIA or the members of the Reference Model Project for the TMF Reference Model to be considered a formal standard.

In September 2013 non-profit CareLex initiated an eTMF standards initiative under the OASIS standards organization to develop a consistent, machine-readable content classification model for eTMFs.^{[8]} This initiative did not receive industry support and is now effectively dismantled.

The TMF contains the trial sponsor’s and participating investigators’ set of content which individually and collectively permit the evaluation of the conduct of a clinical trial and the quality of the data produced. These documents serve to demonstrate compliance with the standards of GCP and with all applicable regulatory requirements.^{[1]} It is part of the evidence provided for regulatory inspection that verifies that the members of the trial team: ensured subject protection, compliance with regulations/Good Clinical Practice, and that scientifically robust benefit-risk data was produced. While ICH GCP E6 details the minimum essential documents, it addresses only a sub-set of TMF content that is required to be created and available for inspection. Documentation requirements for the set-up and maintenance of quality systems, electronic systems, safety monitoring, and proof of an adequate and well-controlled trial, to name a few, exist in various regulations across many countries or regions, but are not explicitly described in ICH GCP E6. Since there was no comprehensive, common industry model or best practice for a TMF, the objective of the TMF RM is to provide a single, unified interpretation of the regulations of the ICH regions as a document-type listing which would be accepted by all clinical trial stakeholders and which can be adopted or adapted by any company, institution or organization. It does not provide guidance on the process by which the content is created, managed or retained.

TMF Reference Model shortcomings

As of May 2013, the TMF RM v2.0 was made available in an electronic spreadsheet format which is suitable for human viewing. While the TMF RM is acceptable for paper TMFs, there is no support for TMF content exchange between computer systems. As the TMF RM is not a standard and is therefore not fixed, the TMF Model allows for flexibility in approach and any aspect of the model can be changed to suit an individual user's needs. Whilst this benefits the individual user, it results in variances in use and interpretation from one company to another.

One issue with the use of the TMF RM as an eTMF classification model relates to duplicate artifact names in the TMF RM. The current release of the TMF RM v3.0 contains several duplicate artifact names such as 'Communications' or 'General', each with different contexts and uses but the same name, which makes the TMF artifact names more challenging to implement in eTMF search and retrieval where a unique set of search results is desired.^{[9]} A second issue with the TMF RM relates to the length of the TMF RM artifact names - one artifact name is more than 64 characters. Different file systems have different limits on the depth of the filename path, creating potential problems and limitations based on the file system hierarchy in use.^{[10]} Thirdly, with respect to the use of the TMF Reference Model as a database schema, the TMF RM v3.0 spreadsheet cannot be used without manual modification as a classification taxonomy in an electronic database.^{[11]} Electronic systems which are not based on interoperability standards are often unable to communicate with other systems or applications.^{[12]} The TMF RM currently lacks a controlled vocabulary based on published standards, which means that content indexed with the TMF RM artifact names and terms could return duplicate records, incorrect records or possibly no records at all if the model is not implemented appropriately.^{[13]}The TMF RM doesn't provide standards-based methods to exchange the TMF model except for exchanging spreadsheet copies of TMF models. Today internet standards such as those promoted by the W3C are utilized for interoperable electronic exchange over legacy manual information exchange approaches.

Development of eTMF Content Exchange Standards and Protocols In an effort to assure interoperability of eTMF data among clinical trial stakeholders, in September 2013 non-profit CareLex initiated an eTMF standards initiative under the OASIS Open standards development organization for the development of a global eTMF ISO standard supporting seamless eTMF content exchange and portability. CareLex and SureClinical Inc are the founding sponsors of the eTMF standards initiative, with participation on the curation of a controlled vocabulary by the National Cancer Institute. The stated objective of the eTMF standards initiative is to "define an open, internationally recognized standard that will assure information interoperability among clinical trial stakeholders in the BioPharma industry." According to minutes from the OASIS eTMF standard Technical Committee, the standards initiative is coordinating the efforts of clinical trial sponsors, CRO’s, research organizations, and vendors to develop an ISO standard. This effort did not receive industry support and has now been dismantled and replaced by the TMF Reference Model Exchange Mechanism.

As of February 2014, a partial list of members in the OASIS eTMF Standard Technical Committee includes CareLex, EMC, Forte Research, HL7, Mayo Clinic, Oracle, Paragon Solutions, Safe-BioPharma, SterlingBio, and SureClinical. National Cancer Institute worked with the OASIS team to curate eTMF terms. The Technical Committee was closed by TC Administration without publication of a standard on 17 November 2017 and is no longer active.

In June 2018, the TMF Reference Model project team published a specification and an example XML exchange file for an eTMF Exchange Mechanism Standard at the DIA Global Meeting in Boston, USA. Use of this standard will help facilitate the exchange of TMF content between systems.

Effective from April 27, 2022 the TMF Reference Model ceased to be affiliated with DIA and transferred affiliation to the CDISC standards organization. Under CDISC, the intention is to develop the TMF Reference Model as a CDISC-certified standard.

== TMF recent developments ==
In February 2013, the EMA (European Medicines Agency) created a draft guideline document that recognizes the importance and legal equivalence of the TMF and the eTMF, and provided guidance to organizations implementing TMFs and eTMF systems. In the guideline document, EMA inspectors state that paper TMF documents may be stored in electronic eTMF systems, and after this process, that the paper may be destroyed. The use of eTMF systems for electronic storage is fully supported by the EMA in clinical trials as a replacement for paper. In a cautionary statement, the agency cites quality problems with TMFs and eTMFs due to document quality and discrepancies such as missing pages, improper labelling or missing documents.^{[16]} In April 2014, the European Parliament approved Regulation (EU) No 536/2014 on clinical trials on medicinal products for human use, repealing Directive 2001/20/EC.^{[17]} Article 57 of the Regulation requires that the TMF "shall at all times contain the essential documents relating to that clinical trial which allow verification of the conduct of a clinical trial and the quality of the data generated", confirming that the trial master file should be maintained contemporaneously. Article 58 requires that "the sponsor and investigator shall archive the content of the clinical trial master file for at least 25 years after the end of the clinical trial." This requirement defines a minimum retention period across the EU for all clinical trial master files, irrespective of whether the data subsequently supports a marketing authorization approval.

== Companies ==
Many contract research organizations (CROs) provide document management services to support trial master file management. In addition, there are a small number of niche companies that focus specifically on the trial master file. Their services include process and quality consultancy, management and filing of trial master file content and provision of trial master file document management technology solutions (eTMFs).

== International Trial Master File (TMF) Day - 10th June ==
The first International TMF Day was on 10th June 2025. The 10th June was chosen to coincide with the date the first International Conference on Harmonization (ICH) on Good Clinical Practice (GCP) ( ) was published in 1996. The phrase 'Trial Master File' was first officially used in this publication. This date also coincides with the launch date in 2010 of the TMF Reference Model Version 1 as shown in the launch presentation. The awareness day was created to raise the importance and focus of the TMF in the clinical trial process. This awareness day was launched on LinkedIn on 27th May 2025.
