= Investigator's brochure =

Compilation of data regarding a drug undergoing human trials

In drug development and medical device development the Investigator's Brochure (IB) is a comprehensive document summarizing the body of information about an investigational product ("IP" or "study drug") obtained during a drug trial. The IB is a document of critical importance throughout the drug development process and is updated with new information as it becomes available. The purpose of the IB is to compile data relevant to studies of the IP in human subjects gathered during preclinical and other clinical trials.

An IB is intended to provide the investigator with insights necessary for management of study conduct and study subjects throughout a clinical trial. An IB may introduce key aspects and safety measures of a clinical trial protocol, such as:

- Dose (of the study drug)
- Frequency of dosing interval
- Methods of administration
- Safety monitoring procedures

An IB contains a "Summary of Data and Guidance for the Investigator" section, of which the overall aim is to "provide the investigator with a clear understanding of the possible risks and adverse reactions, and of the specific tests, observations, and precautions that may be needed for a clinical trial. This understanding should be based on the available physical, chemical, pharmaceutical, pharmacological, toxicological, and clinical information on the investigational product(s). Guidance should also be provided to the clinical investigator on the recognition and treatment of possible overdose and adverse drug reactions that is based on previous human experience and on the pharmacology of the investigational product".

The sponsor is responsible for keeping the information in the IB up-to-date. The IB should be reviewed annually and must be updated when any new and important information becomes available, such as when a drug has received marketing approval and can be prescribed for use commercially.

Owing to the importance of the IB in maintaining the safety of human subjects in clinical trials, and as part of their guidance on good clinical practice (GCP), the U.S. Food and Drug Administration (FDA) has written regulatory codes and guidances for authoring the IB, and the International Conference on Harmonisation (ICH) has prepared a detailed guidance for the authoring of the IB in the European Union (EU), Japan, and the United States (US).

== Guidance documents ==
As part of its guidance on good clinical practice (GCP), the International Conference on Harmonisation (ICH) has prepared a detailed guidance for the contents of the IB in the European Union (EU), Japan, and the United States (US). (broken link)

If many clinical trials have been completed, tables that summarize findings across the various studies can be very useful to demonstrate outcomes in, e.g., different patient populations or different indications.

- Code of Federal Regulations, Title 21, Part 312, Investigational New Drug Application
- Code of Federal Regulations, Title 21, Part 201.56 (and Part 201.57)
- CDER Guidance for Industry. Adverse Reactions Section of Labeling for Human Prescription Drug and Biological Products — Content and Format.
- CDER Guidance for Industry. Clinical Studies Section of Labeling for Human Prescription Drug and Biological Products — Content and Format.
- CDER Guidance for Industry. Estimating the Maximum Safe Starting Dose in Initial Clinical Trials for Therapeutics in Adult Healthy Volunteers.

== See also ==
- Directive 2001/20/EC (Europe)
- Directive 2005/28/EC (Europe)
- Clinical trial
