= Commission Directive 91/71/EEC =

1991 EU directive

Directive 91/71/EEC
- European Union directive
- Title: Commission Directive 91/71/EEC of 16 January 1991 completing Council Directive 88/388/EEC on the approximation of the laws of the Member States relating to flavourings for use in foodstuffs and to source materials for their production
- Made by: Commission

History
- Date made: 16 January 1991
- Entry into force: 7 February 1991
- Implementation date: 7 February 1991

Directive 91/71/EEC is an EU directive that was passed by the European Commission in 1991 regarding the level of sweeteners, flavourings and additives used in foods by states within the European Union and banning foods that did not comply. The directive was repealed in 2011.

== Regulations ==
The directive required that all foodstuffs containing colouring, additives or flavouring, within member states in the EU had to be identified clearly on the packaging. The directive was an attempt to harmonise the identification of sweeteners and prohibit additives within certain foods. The directive would come into force in 1994, when all foods that did not conform would be banned from sale in the EU.

== Prawn cocktail crisps ==
One particular euromyth about the directive was that it would lead to a ban of prawn cocktail-flavoured crisps in the United Kingdom. The source of the myth was a proposal by EU Commissioner Martin Bangemann to ban artificial sweeteners in crisps, thus leading to news reports that the EU wanted to ban prawn cocktail crisps altogether. As a result, Bangemann was called "The sour kraut who wants to ban our crisps" in the British media, and journalists followed him in Luxembourg and offered him prawn cocktail crisps.

The potential ban was later revealed to an error on the part of the UK's Civil Service, which forgot to include specifically-flavoured crisps when they compiled a list of the nation's food items that were to be exempt from the directive. When the food industry pointed out the omission, the mistake was rectified.

The story was parodied in The Thin Blue Line sitcom in which a French EU Commissioner states, "You [British] insist on eating prawn cocktail crisps, despite the fact we have told you not to!". It was also cited by Boris Johnson during the United Kingdom's referendum on the British membership in the European Union campaign in 2016.
