= Directive 2001/83/EC =

Main European Union (EU) law on pharmaceutical goods

Directive 2001/83/EC of the European Parliament and of the Council of 6 November 2001 is the main piece of pharmaceutical regulation of the European Union.

It relates to medicinal products for human use in mainly countries that are part of the European Union.

The Directive deals with the disparities between certain national provisions, in particular between provisions relating to medicinal products, which directly affect the functioning of the internal market of the European Union, and regulated the activities of the European Medicines Agency.

== See also ==
- EudraLex
- Directive 65/65/EEC1, requires prior approval for marketing of proprietary medicinal products
- Directive 75/318/EEC
- Directive 75/319/EEC, requires marketing authorization requests to be drawn up only by qualified experts
- Directive 93/41/EEC
- Directive 2001/20/EC
- European Directive on Traditional Herbal Medicinal Products
- Regulation of therapeutic goods
- European Medicines Agency
