= Directive 75/318/EEC =

Directive 75/318/EEC of 20 May 1975 of the European Union, on the approximation of the laws of Member States relating to analytical, pharmaco-toxicological and clinical standards and protocols in respect of the testing of proprietary medicinal products, sought to bring the benefits of innovative pharmaceuticals to patients across Europe by introducing the mutual recognition, by Member States, of their respective national marketing authorisations.

The Directive says that Member States shall take all appropriate measures to ensure that the applications for marketing authorization, are submitted by the applicants in accordance with the guidelines of the Directive.

== See also ==
- EudraLex
- Directive 75/319/EEC
- Directive 65/65/EEC1
- Directive 93/41/EEC
- Directive 2001/83/EC
- Regulation of therapeutic goods
- European Medicines Agency
