= Directive 93/41/EEC =

European Union Directive (EU) 1993/41

Council of the European Communities Directive 93/41/EEC of 14 June 1993 repealed Directive 87/22/EEC on the approximation of national measures relating to the marketing of high-technology medicinal products, as this directive had been superseded by Council Regulation (EEC) No 2309/93 of 22 July 1993 laying down Community procedures for the authorization and supervision of medicinal products for human and veterinary use and establishing a European Agency for the Evaluation of Medicinal Products (5) and by Council Directive 88/182/EEC of 22 March 1988 amending Directive 83/189/EEC laying down a procedure for the provision of information in the field of technical standards and regulations (6).

== See also ==
- EudraLex
- Directive 65/65/EEC1
- Directive 75/318/EEC
- Directive 75/319/EEC
- Directive 2001/83/EC
- Regulation of therapeutic goods
- European Medicines Agency
