= EudraLex =

EU laws on medicinal products

EudraLex is the collection of rules and regulations governing medicinal products in the European Union.

== Volumes ==
EudraLex consists of 10 volumes:

- Concerning Medicinal Products for Human use:
  - Volume 1 - Pharmaceutical Legislation.
  - Volume 2 - Notice to Applicants.
    - Volume 2A deals with procedures for marketing authorisation.
    - Volume 2B deals with the presentation and content of the application dossier.
    - Volume 2C deals with Guidelines.
  - Volume 3 - Guidelines.
- Concerning Medicinal Products for human use in clinical trials (investigational medicinal products).
  - Volume 10 - Clinical trials.
- Concerning Veterinary Medicinal Products:
  - Volume 5 - Pharmaceutical Legislation.
  - Volume 6 - Notice to Applicants.
  - Volume 7 - Guidelines.
  - Volume 8 - Maximum residue limits.
- Concerning Medicinal Products for Human and Veterinary use:
  - Volume 4 - Good Manufacturing Practices.
  - Volume 9 - Pharmacovigilance.
- Miscellaneous:
  - Guidelines on Good Distribution Practice of Medicinal Products for Human Use (94/C 63/03)

== Directives ==
- Directive 65/65/EEC1, requires prior approval for marketing of proprietary medicinal products
- Directive 75/318/EEC, clarifies requirements of 65/65/EEC1 and requires member states to enforce them
- Directive 75/319/EEC, requires marketing authorization requests to be drawn up only by qualified experts
- Directive 93/41/EEC, establishes the European Agency for the Evaluation of Medicinal Products
- Directive 2001/20/EC, defines rules for the conduct of clinical trials
- Directive 2001/83/EC
- Directive 2005/28/EC, defines Good Clinical Practice for design and conduct of clinical trials

== See also ==
- European Union law
- European Union directive
- European Commission
- Directorate-General
- EUR-Lex
- Regulation of therapeutic goods
- International Conference on Harmonisation of Technical Requirements for Registration of Pharmaceuticals for Human Use
- Good clinical practice
- European Medicines Agency
- EUDRANET
- EudraVigilance
- Title 21 of the Code of Federal Regulations (USA)
- Drug development
