= Directive 75/319/EEC =

Directive 75/319/EEC of 20 May 1975 on the approximation of the laws of Member States relating to analytical, pharmaco-toxicological and clinical standards and protocols in respect of the testing of proprietary medicinal products. This directive of the European Union sought to bring the benefits of innovative pharmaceuticals to patients across Europe by introducing the mutual recognition, by Member States, of their respective national marketing authorisations.

The Directive says that Member States shall take all appropriate measures to ensure that the documents and particulars for marketing authorization requests are drawn up by experts with the necessary technical or professional qualifications before they are submitted to the competent authorities.

== See also ==
- EudraLex
- Directive 75/318/EEC
- Directive 65/65/EEC1
- Directive 93/41/EEC
- Directive 2001/83/EC
- Regulation of therapeutic goods
- European Medicines Agency
