= Regulation (European Union) =

Type of EU legislative act

A regulation is a legal act of the European Union which becomes immediately enforceable as law in all member states simultaneously. Regulations can be distinguished from directives which, at least in principle, need to be transposed into national law. Regulations can be adopted by means of a variety of legislative procedures depending on their subject matter. Despite their name, regulations are primary legislation rather than regulatory delegated legislation; hence, the EU increasingly uses the term "Act" in the short titles of many of its regulations (e.g., the Digital Services Act).

== Description ==
The description of regulations can be found in Article 288 of the Treaty on the Functioning of the European Union (formerly Article 249 TEC).

Article 288

To exercise the Union's competences, the institutions shall adopt regulations, directives, decisions, recommendations and opinions.

A regulation shall have general application. It shall be binding in its entirety and directly applicable in all Member States.

A directive shall be binding, as to the result to be achieved, upon each Member State to which it is addressed, but shall leave to the national authorities the choice of form and methods.

A decision shall be binding in its entirety upon those to whom it is addressed.

Recommendations and opinions shall have no binding force.

The Council can delegate legislative authority to the Commission and, depending on the area and the appropriate legislative procedure, both institutions can make laws. There are Council regulations and Commission regulations. Article 288 does not clearly distinguish between legislative acts and administrative acts, as is normally done in national legal systems.

== Legal effect ==
Regulations are in some sense equivalent to the legislative acts of the member states, in the sense that what they say is law and they do not need to be mediated into national law by means of implementing measures. As such, regulations constitute one of the most powerful forms of European Union law. Therefore, they require a great deal of care in their drafting and formulation.

When a regulation comes into force, it overrides all national laws dealing with the same subject matter and subsequent national legislation must be consistent with and made in the light of the regulation. While member states are prohibited from obscuring the direct effect of regulations, it is common practice to pass legislation dealing with consequential matters arising from the coming into force of a regulation.

Although a regulation in principle has a direct effect, the Belgian Constitutional Court has ruled that the international institutions, such as the EU, may not derogate from the national identity as set out in the political and constitutional basic structures of the country, or the core values of the protection of the Constitution.

== Subclasses ==
Name	Example title	Example ELI	Example CELEX
Regulation of the European Parliament and of the Council	Regulation (EU) No 524/2013 of the European Parliament and of the Council of 21 May 2013 on online dispute resolution for consumer disputes and amending Regulation (EC) No 2006/2004 and Directive 2009/22/EC (Regulation on consumer ODR)	http://data.europa.eu/eli/reg/2013/524/oj	32013R0524
Council Regulation	Council regulation (EC) No 1346/2000 of 29 May 2000 on insolvency proceedings	http://data.europa.eu/eli/reg/2000/1346/oj	32000R1346
Commission Regulation	Commission Regulation (EC) No 2257/94 of 16 September 1994 laying down quality standards for bananas (Text with EEA relevance)	http://data.europa.eu/eli/reg/1994/2257/oj	31994R2257
Commission Implementing Regulation	Commission Implementing Regulation (EU) No 923/2012 of 26 September 2012 laying down the common rules of the air and operational provisions regarding services and procedures in air navigation and amending Implementing Regulation (EU) No 1035/2011 and Regulations (EC) No 1265/2007, (EC) No 1794/2006, (EC) No 730/2006, (EC) No 1033/2006 and (EU) No 255/2010 Text with EEA relevance	http://data.europa.eu/eli/reg_impl/2012/923/oj	32012R0923

== See also ==
- Acquis communautaire – EU's accumulated law and legal precedent
- EudraLex – EU laws on medicinal products
- EUR-Lex – Official website of EU Law and documents
- European Union law
- Framework decision – Former EU law on criminal justice
- List of European Union directives
- List of European Union regulations
