= Good clinical practice =

International quality standard for drug testing and production

In drug development and production, good clinical practice (GCP) is an international quality standard, which governments can then transpose into regulations for clinical trials involving human subjects. GCP follows the International Council for Harmonisation of Technical Requirements for Registration of Pharmaceuticals for Human Use (ICH), and enforces tight guidelines on ethical aspects of clinical research.

High standards are required in terms of comprehensive documentation for the clinical protocol, record keeping, training, and facilities, including computers and software. Quality assurance and inspections ensure that these standards are achieved. GCP aims to ensure that the studies are scientifically authentic and that the clinical properties of the investigational product are properly documented.

GCP guidelines include protection of human rights for the subjects and volunteers in a clinical trial. It also provides assurance of the safety and efficacy of the newly developed compounds. GCP guidelines include standards on how clinical trials should be conducted, define the roles and responsibilities of institutional review boards, clinical research investigators, clinical trial sponsors, and monitors. In the pharmaceutical industry monitors are often called clinical research associates.

A series of unsuccessful and ineffective clinical trials in the past were the main reason for the creation of ICH and GCP guidelines in the US and Europe. These discussions ultimately led to the development of certain regulations and guidelines, which evolved into the code of practice for international consistency of quality research.

== History ==
ICH first published the Good Clinical Practice (GCP) guideline as E6 in 1996. The guideline was revised as E6(R2) in 2016 and as E6(R3) in 2025.

== Legal and regulatory status ==
- European Union: In the EU, Good Clinical Practice is backed and regulated by formal legislation contained in the Clinical Trial Regulation (Officially Regulation (EU) No 536/2014 of the European Parliament and of the Council of 16 April 2014 on clinical trials on medicinal products for human use, and repealing Directive 2001/20/EC). A similar guideline for clinical trials of medical devices is the international standard ISO 14155, which is valid in the European Union as a harmonized standard. These standards for clinical trials are sometimes referred to as ICH-GCP or ISO-GCP to differentiate between the two and the lowest grade of recommendation in clinical guidelines.
- United States: Although ICH GCP guidelines are recommended by the Food and Drug Administration (FDA), they are not statutory in the United States. The National Institutes of Health requires NIH-funded clinical investigators and clinical trial staff who are involved in the design, conduct, oversight, or management of clinical trials to be trained in Good Clinical Practice.

== ICH GCP overview ==
- Glossary
- Principles of ICH GCP
- Guidelines for:
  - institutional review board (IRB) / independent ethics committee (IEC)
  - investigator
  - trial sponsor (industrial, academic)
  - clinical trial protocol and protocol amendments
  - investigator's brochure
  - essential documents

== Criticism ==
GCP has been called 'a less morally authoritative document' than the Declaration of Helsinki, lacking moral principles and guidance in the following areas:

- Disclosure of conflict of interest
- Public disclosure of study design
- Benefit for populations in which research is conducted
- Reporting of accurate results and publication of negative findings
- Access to treatment after research has been conducted
- Restriction of use of placebo in control group where effective alternative treatment is available

In the book Bad Pharma, Ben Goldacre mentions these criticisms and notes that the GCP rules "aren't terrible... [they are] more focused on procedures, while Helsinki clearly articulates moral principles".

== See also ==
- GxP – Good practice guidelines and regulations
- Good laboratory practice
- Data monitoring committees
- Directive 2001/20/EC
- Drug development – Process of bringing a new pharmaceutical drug to the market
- EudraVigilance
- European Forum for Good Clinical Practice
- European Medicines Agency – Agency of the European Union
- Institutional review board – Type of committee that applies research ethics
- Inverse benefit law – Drug benefit-harm ratio falls with marketing
- Medical ethics – System of moral principles of the practice of medicine
- Pharmaceutical company – Industry involved with discovery, development, production and marketing of drugs
- Pharmacovigilance – Study of pharmaceutical drug safety
