= Directive 65/65/EEC =

Directive 65/65/EEC1 was the first European pharmaceutical directive. (Dated 26 January 1965.)

== Intention ==
The directive was a reaction to the Thalidomide tragedy in the early 1960s, when thousands of babies were born with deformities as a result of their mothers taking the drug during pregnancy. The directive aimed at harmonising standards for the approval of medicines within the then European Economic Community.

== Regulation ==
The main article 3 of the directive requires that a Proprietary medicinal product could not be marketed within the community without prior authorisation of the competent authority of at least one member state. Proprietary medicinal product being defined as "Any ready-prepared medicinal product placed on the market under a special name and in a special pack."

== See also ==
- EudraLex
- Kefauver Harris Amendment
- Regulation of therapeutic goods
- European Medicines Agency
