= List of patient-reported quality of life surveys =

This page lists patient-reported quality of life surveys used in the field of medicine, pharmaceuticals, and other scientific trials. These surveys are patient-reported outcome measures, may be questionnaires or surveys, and may be used to evaluate patient satisfaction, symptoms, disease state, or psychological well-being.

== List ==
- Alzheimer's disease. The Quality of Life of Carers of Alzheimer's Disease Patients (ACQLI) is a measure which assesses the quality of life of people who care for Alzheimer's disease patients. It was developed in 1997 by Galen Research and has been used in studies investigating rosiglitazone and the effects of pharmacological treatment.
- Angina. The Seattle Angina Questionnaire (SAQ) measures five dimensions of coronary disease and consists of 19 items. The SAQ has been utilized in studies investigating spinal cord stimulation, ivabradine and ranolazine and refractory angina pectoris.
- Ankylosing spondylitis. The Ankylosing Spondylitis Quality of Life questionnaire (ASQoL) was developed Galen Research and published in 2003. It has been used in the evaluation of adalimumab and etanercept.
- Asthma.
1. The Adult Asthma Quality of Life Questionnaire (AQLQ) was developed at McMaster University in Ontario, Canada and was published in 1992. It has since been used as a comparison tool as well as a tool in clinical trials.
2. The Asthma Life Impact Scale (ALIS) measure was developed in 2010 by Galen Research. It has been translated into 16 languages.
- Atopic dermatitis.
1. The Parents' Index of Quality of Life in Atopic Dermatitis (PiQOL-AD) measures the impact that atopic dermatitis has on quality of life, from the parents' perspective. It has 28 items and was developed simultaneously in the United Kingdom, The Netherlands, Germany, Italy, Spain, France and the United States. It has been utilised in several research studies investigating the treatment of paediatric atopic dermatitis with pimecrolimus. and also in a research study regarding health-related quality of life measurement in children in Ibero-American countries.
2. The Quality of Life Index for Atopic Dermatitis (QoLIAD) measures the impact that atopic dermatitis has on a given patient's quality of life. It is a 25 item questionnaire for patients over the age of 16. The QoLIAD has also been utilized in studies looking into educational intervention, topical corticosteroids and pimecrolimus.
- Arthroplasty (Knee replacement).The Oxford knee score (OKS) is owned by Isis Outcomes and was developed at Oxford University. It was published in 1998. It has been validated for use in assessing other non-surgical treatments for issues of the knee.
- Chickenpox. The Family Disruption Measure for Chickenpox was developed in 1994 by Galen Research. It has been used in a study investigating rotavirus gastroenteritis.
- Chronic Otitis media. The Zurich Chronic Middle Ear Inventory (ZCMEI-21) has 21 questionnaires with answers as a 5-point Likert scale and measures health-related quality of life in chronic Otitis media with or without Cholesteatoma. It has originally been developed in German and has been translated into several languages, including English, Italian and Japanese.
- Chronic obstructive pulmonary disease. The Living with Chronic Obstructive Pulmonary Disease questionnaire (LCOPD) has 22 yes or no questions and measures a patient's quality of life. It has been translated into 14 languages and also been used in an investigation of fatigue, sleep loss and mood for patients with COPD.
- Depression. The Quality of Life in Depression Scale (QLDS) assesses the impact that depression has on a patient's quality of life. It was developed by Galen Research in 1992 and was funded by Lilly Industries. Studies utilizing the QLDS include investigations into venlafaxine, duloxetine and bupropion.
- Diabetes. The Diabetes Health Profile (DHP) was developed in 1996 by Isis Outcomes. It has been officially adapted into 29 languages and was selected by the United Kingdom Department of Health for their Long Term Conditions PROM Pilot Study.
- Epilepsy. The Epilepsy Surgery Inventory 55 (ESI-55) was developed at the University of California and covers eleven health concepts. It has been used in clinical studies to investigate life pre and post surgery, psychiatric disorders and the subjective handicap of epilepsy.
- Eye disease. The National Eye Institute Visual Function (VFQ-25) is a 25-item questionnaire designed to assess eye health, intended for use in clinical studies. The survey has been utilized in clinical studies investigating macular degeneration, congenital cataracts and uveitis.
- Fatigue. The Unidimensional Fatigue Impact Scale (U-FIS) was developed in 2009 by Galen Research primarily for the measurement of multiple sclerosis related fatigue. It has been recommended for use in determining fatigue by an independent clinical research study and translated into eight languages.
- General Health.
1. The Assessment of Quality of Life scales (AQoL) were psychometrically developed and refined over the past 30 years and are reliable and well-validated. There are 4 instruments available; the AQoL-8D is the most comprehensive as it assesses HR-QoL across 8 domains - independent living, happiness, mental health, coping, relationships, self worth, pain, senses (https://www.aqol.com.au).
2. The Quality of Well-Being Scale (QWB) was developed in the 1970s, and a self-administered version called the QWB-SA was published in 1996. The QWB has been used in studies investigating HIV patients and musculoskeletal disease, amongst others.
3. The EQ-5D is a generalised health-related quality of life measure which was developed in 1991 by the EuroQol Group. It has five standard dimensions and has been translated into over 60 languages. The EuroQoL has been extensively used in clinical trials, investigating a range of topics including overactive bladder, attention deficit hyperactivity disorder and denosumab for osteoporosis.
4. The Nottingham Health Profile (NHP) is a general patient-reported outcome designed to measure a patient's view of their own health status, in a number of areas. It can be completed in 5 minutes. It was developed in 1975 and current copyright belongs to Galen Research. Clinical research studies where the NHP has been utilized include investigations into erythropoiesis-stimulating agents, glucocorticoid replacement therapy and transcutaneous electrical nerve stimulation for tinnitus.
5. The Short Form 36 (SF-36) Health Survey is a survey of general health developed by the RAND corporation. It was designed for use in clinical practice, research, health policy evaluations and population surveys. It has been used in numerous studies including ones investigating giardia intestinalis, breast cancer survivors and Parkinson's disease.
6. The Sickness Impact Profile (SIP) was developed in 1997 by the Johns Hopkins University. It consists of 136 items and has been adapted for strokes, and ex-ICU patients.
7. The Health Utilities Index measures health status, health-related quality of life and produces utility scores. It was developed by Health Utilities Inc. in Canada. It has been used in clinical studies investigating knee osteoarthritis, urinary incontinence and children who have been admitted to intensive care.
- Genital herpes.
1. The Herpes Outbreak Impact Questionnaire (HOIQ) is designed to determine the impact of recurrent genital herpes outbreaks on a patient's life. Its efficacy has been tested in an Australian clinical trial.
2. The Herpes Symptom Checklist (HSC) was developed alongside the HOIQ in order to assess daily symptoms of genital herpes outbreaks. It was also used in an Australian clinical trial which tested the effectiveness of famciclovir.
3. The Recurrent genital herpes quality of life measure (RGHQoL) was developed in 1998 by Galen Research in order to assess the impact recurrent genital herpes has on quality of life. It has been used in clinical trials investigating famciclovir, suppressive antiviral therapy and patient perspectives and quality of life.
- Growth hormone deficiency. The Quality of Life Assessment of Growth Hormone Deficiency in Adults Measure (QoL-AGHDA) was developed by Galen Research and measures the effect growth hormone deficiency has on adult patients. The QoL-AGHDA has been used in numerous clinical practice and research studies worldwide and is also utilized by the Pfizer International Metabolic Database (KIMS) and the National Institute for Health and Care Excellence (NICE) in the UK.
- Kidney disease. The Kidney Disease Quality of Life (KD-QOL) Instrument was developed in 1994 by the RAND corporation. It has been utilized in studies investigating thirst and xerostomia in maintenance hemodialysis patients, different types of dialysis and quality of life in hemodialysis patients.
- Migraine. The Migraine Specific Quality of Life (MSQoL) was funded by the Wellcome Foundation and developed by Galen Research, as part of an international research study which was conducted in eight countries, with initial work conducted in the UK and US. It has been used to assess the effect of nadolol and topiramate, regular water intake and using migraine patients as trainers in preventive attack management.
- Multiple sclerosis. The Patient Reported Outcome Indices for Multiple Sclerosis (PRIMUS) was developed in 2009 by Galen Research and funded by Novartis Pharmaceuticals. The PRIMUS has been used to assess the efficacy of fingolimod and rivastigmine. and has been translated into ten different languages.
- Osteoarthritis. The Osteoarthritis Quality of Life (OAQOL) questionnaire was published in 2008 and was developed at the University of Leeds, the University of Lancashire and Galen Research. It has been used in clinical studies investigating prednisolone, methotrexate and hydroxychloroquine.
- Pachyonychia Congenita. The Pachyonychia Congenita Quality of Life (PCQoL) was developed in 2012 to determine the effect Pachyonychia Congenita has on a patient's quality of life.
- Rheumatoid arthritis. The Rheumatoid Arthritis Quality of Life (RAQoL) questionnaire determines the effect rheumatoid arthritis has on a patient's quality of life. The RAQoL has 30 items with a yes and no response format and takes about six minutes to complete. The RAQoL has been used in clinical studies in order to confirm the efficacy of tocilizumab and infliximab.
- Pulmonary hypertension. The Cambridge Pulmonary Hypertension Outcome Review (CAMPHOR) is a disease-specific measure which assesses quality of life of patients with pulmonary hypertension. It was developed in 2006 and has since been translated into fourteen different languages. The CAMPHOR has been utilized in clinical trials which investigate the effects of treprostinil, as well as trials which investigate sildenafil.
- Psoriasis. The Psoriasis Index of Quality of Life (PSORIQOL) was the first psoriasis specific quality of life questionnaire. It was developed in 2003 by Galen Research and has been translated into 10 languages. The PSORIQOL has been recognized by the National Institute for Health and Care Excellence (NICE) as a suitable tool for assessing disease impact and has also been used in clinical studies.
- Psoriatic arthritis. The Psoriatic Arthritis Quality of Life (PsAQoL) measures the effect that psoriatic arthritis has on a patient's quality of life. It is a self-administered, 20-item questionnaire that takes about three minutes to complete. It has been translated into 30 languages and used to evaluate infliximab and adalimumab.
- Scars. The Patient-Reported Impact of Scars Measure (PRISM) was developed in 2010 by Galen Research and was the first scar specific patient-reported outcome measure. It consists of two scales: one with 24 items for quality of life, and one with 13 items for symptoms.
- Systemic lupus erythematosus. The Systemic Lupus Erythematosus Quality of Life measure (L-QoL or SLEQoL) was published in 2009 by Galen Research and was funded by the Arthritis Research Campaign. It has been evaluated in two medical research studies.
