= Biomedical Systems =

Clinical trials company

- Company type: Private
- Industry: Healthcare; Clinical research; Pharmaceutical service; Medical technology
- Founded: 1975
- Founder: Ray Barrett
- Headquarters: Maryland Heights, Missouri, United States
- Number of locations: 5 (Internationally)
- Number of employees: ~400 (2016)
- Parent: ERT

Biomedical Systems Corporation was a U.S.–based provider of centralized clinical trial services and medical technology founded in 1975 by W. Raymond Barrett and headquartered in Maryland Heights, Missouri. The company supplied cardiac safety, medical imaging and respiratory endpoint services, and supported electronic patient-reported outcomes (ePRO) for biopharmaceutical sponsors and CROs. In April 2014 it sold its physician- and hospital-based cardiology testing unit to BioTelemetry for approximately $8.65 million in cash and stock, and in September 2017 it was acquired by ERT (eResearch Technology). Following ERT’s merger with Bioclinica, the parent company rebranded as Clario in 2021.

== History ==
Founded in 1975, Biomedical Systems offered centralized cardiac safety, medical imaging and respiratory services in drug development and also collected, analyzed and distributed electronic patient-reported outcome (ePRO) in multiple modalities across all phases of clinical research.

In 2010 Biomedical Systems introduced their own Wireless Ambulatory ECG Monitoring System called the TruVue™ Wireless Telemetry Device as part of their Cardiac Patient Services Business. TruVue would record and remotely transmit heartbeats for up to 30 days; and was intended for the diagnosis and management of atrial fibrillation and other cardiac arrhythmia. Biomedical Systems later sold TruVue to Malvern, Pennsylvania-based BioTelemetry, Inc. for $8.65 million.

Later in 2012 Biomedical Systems added ePRO services through their acquisition of Belgium-based Symfo.

On September 8, 2017, ERT announced its acquisition of Biomedical Systems.

== Controversies and legal issues ==
In 2002, the U.S. Court of Appeals for the Eighth Circuit affirmed a jury verdict awarding Biomedical Systems $75 million in a breach-of-contract case against GE Marquette Medical Systems related to FDA clearance strategy for a home uterine activity monitor.

== Locations ==
- Maryland Heights, Missouri (global headquarters)
- Brussels, Belgium (European headquarters, established in 1981)
- Tsukuba, Japan
- Pondicherry, India
- Beijing, China (partnership)

== See also ==
- Contract research organization
- Electronic patient-reported outcome
- Cardiac monitoring
