= Data clarification form =

Questionnaire used in clinical research

A data clarification form (DCF) or data query form is a questionnaire specifically used in clinical research. The DCF is the primary data clarification tool from the trial sponsor or contract research organization (CRO) towards the investigator to clarify discrepancies and ask the investigator for clarification. The DCF is part of the data validation process in a clinical trial.

== See also ==
- Case report form
- Clinical data acquisition
- Clinical research associate (CRA)
- Clinical trial
- Clinical trial protocol
- Drug development
- Electronic data capture
- Patient-reported outcome
