= Signs and symptoms of cancer =

Cancer signs and symptoms
- Symptoms of cancer can be based on the affected organs.
- Specialty: Oncology
- Deaths: 8.8 million (2015)

Cancer symptoms are changes in the body caused by the presence of cancer. They are usually caused by the effect of a cancer on the part of the body where it is growing, although the disease can cause more general symptoms such as weight loss or tiredness. There are more than 100 different types of cancer with a wide range of signs and symptoms which can manifest in different ways.

== Signs and symptoms ==
Cancer is a group of diseases involving abnormal cell growth with the potential to invade or spread to other parts of the body. Cancer can be difficult to diagnose because its signs and symptoms are often nonspecific, meaning they may be general phenomena that do not point directly to a specific disease process.

In medicine, a sign is an objective piece of data that can be measured or observed, as in a high body temperature (fever), a rash, or a bruise. A symptom, by contrast, is the subjective experience that may signify a disease, illness or injury, such as pain, dizziness, or fatigue. Signs and symptoms are not mutually exclusive, for example a subjective feeling of fever can be noted as sign by using a thermometer that registers a high reading.

Because many symptoms of cancer are gradual in onset and general in nature, cancer screening (also called cancer surveillance) is a key public health priority. This may include laboratory work, physical examinations, tissue samples, or diagnostic imaging tests that a community of experts recommends be conducted at set intervals for particular populations. Screenings can identify cancers before symptoms develop, or early in the disease course. Certain cancers can be prevented with vaccines against the viruses that cause them (e.g., HPV vaccines as prevention against cervical cancer).

Additionally, patient education about worrisome symptoms that require further evaluation is paramount to reduce morbidity and mortality from cancer. Symptoms that cause excess worry, symptoms that persist or are unexplained, and/or the appearance of several symptoms together particularly warrant evaluation by a health professional.

=== Mechanisms ===
Cancer may produce symptoms in one or more of the following ways:

- Mass effect: An abnormal growth of tissue, or tumor, may compress nearby structures, causing pain, inflammation or disruption of function. Not all cancers produce solid tumors. Even benign cancers (those that do not metastasize, or spread to other tissues) may have serious consequences if they appear in dangerous places, particularly the heart or brain. Small bowel obstructions caused by the growth of a tumor in the digestive system is another example of a 'space-occupying' consequence of cancer.
- Loss of Function: Tumor cells may deplete normal cells of oxygen and nutrients, thus disrupting the function of a vital organ. Many tumors stimulate new blood vessel formation which serves to supply the tumor rather than the normal, healthy tissue. The abnormal function of cancer cells and reduced function of normal cells in a given organ may lead to organ failure.
  - Increased Lactate Production: The Warburg Effect states that cancer cells in the presence of oxygen and glucose take a different path of energy production, diverting energy for biomass production to support tumor growth. This unique metabolism of cancer cells opens doors for possible cancer treatments including targeting lactate dehydrogenase and TCA intermediate production.
- Paraneoplastic Syndromes: Some cancers produce "ectopic" hormones, particularly when tumors arise from neuroendocrine cells, causing a variety of endocrine imbalances. Examples include the production of parathyroid hormones by parathyroid tumors or serotonin by carcinoid tumors. In these cases, the cell types that produce these active small molecules proliferate malignantly and lose their responsiveness to negative feedback. Because hormones operate on tissues far from the site of production, paraneoplastic signs and symptoms may appear far from the tumor of origin.
  - Venous Thromboembolism: Patients with certain types of cancers are at increased risk of blood clots due to excess production of clotting factors. These clots may disrupt circulation locally or dislodge and travel to the heart, lungs, or brain, and may be fatal. Symptoms of blood clots may include pain, swelling, warmth and in late stages, numbness, particularly in the arms and legs. Some cancer treatments may further increase this risk.
- Effusions: Cancers may stimulate fluid shifts in the body and lead to extracellular collections of fluid. Breast and lung cancer, for example, often cause pleural effusions, or a buildup of fluid in the lining of the lungs. Abdominal cancers, including ovarian and uterine cancers, may cause fluid buildup in the abdominal cavity.

==== Suspicious Symptoms ====
Symptoms of cancer may be nonspecific changes to the individual's sense of physical well-being (constitutional symptoms), or may localize to a particular organ system or anatomic region.

The following symptoms may be manifestations of an underlying cancer. Alternatively, they may point to non-cancerous disease processes, benign tumors, or even be within the physiological range of normal. They may appear at the primary site of cancer or be symptoms of cancer metastasis, or spread. Further workup by a trained healthcare professional is required to diagnose cancer.

==== Constitutional Symptoms ====
- Unexplained weight loss: Weight loss that is unintended and not explained by diet, exercise or other illness may be a warning sign of many types of cancer
- Unexplained pain: Pain that persists, has no clear cause, and does not respond to treatment may be a warning sign of many types of cancers.
- Unexplained tiredness or fatigue: Unusual and persistent tiredness may point to underlying illness, including blood cell cancers like leukemia or lymphoma
- Unexplained night sweats or fever: These may be signs of an immune system cancer. Fever in children rarely points to malignancy, but may merit evaluation.

==== Local Symptoms ====
System	Symptom	Cancer Type	Notes
Head & Neck	Difficulty in swallowing	Esophageal (throat) or GI cancer	
Respiratory	persistent cough or hoarseness Blood in sputum (hemoptysis) Shortness of breath (dyspnea)	Lung cancer	
Gastrointestinal (GI)	Change in bowel habits Unusual diarrhea or constipation Continuing indigestion or heartburn Abdominal pain, bloating, or nausea Blood in the stool Enlarged liver	GI or GU cancers, including stomach, pancreatic, colon, prostate or bladder	Significant bloating or the feeling of fullness (satiety) is a known symptom of ovarian or uterine cancers.
Genitourinary (GU)	Difficulty passing urine Any abnormal bleeding, including menstrual irregularities*, bleeding from the vagina blood in urine	Urothelial cancers, as in bladder or kidney cancer or GI cancers Uterine, ovarian or vaginal cancer	*Postmenopausal vaginal bleeding is always abnormal and should be evaluated for possible cancer.
Skin/Mucosa	Persistent sore or ulcer* Unexplained rash Unusual lump Changes in a mole*	Skin cancers, including melanoma, basal cell carcinoma, or squamous cell carcinoma Oral cancers, or other cancers of the tissues where they develop	*These are increasingly concerning in people who use tobacco or alcohol. **These are often evaluated with the ABCD mnemonic for changes in
Breast	New lumps Changes in skin texture, e.g. dimpling Inversion of nipples Unusual or bloody discharge	Breast Cancer	Breast cancer develops especially but not exclusively in women.
Musculoskeletal	Bone pain Fractures, esp. spinal		
Hematologic/Immunologic	Excessive bruising or bleeding Swollen lymph node or unusual lump	Leukemias Lymphomas	Bruises out of proportion to direct injury or
Neurologic	Persistent headaches New-onset seizures Vertigo	Brain cancer	Headaches that last for more than two weeks, or a first presentation of seizure should warrant evaluation for possible brain tumor.

== Medical Workup ==
When patients present with "suspicious symptoms", healthcare providers follow specific guidelines or diagnostic pathways to evaluate for potential cancer. Healthcare professionals face challenges of distinguishing potentially serious symptoms as opposed to common benign conditions. Recent research in the UK has shown that some cancer types often require multiple consultations before confirmed diagnosis. Understanding these diagnostic challenges is crucial for both the healthcare providers and patients in navigating the cancer diagnostic process effectively and ethically.

A healthcare professional may pursue a formal diagnostic workup to evaluate symptoms of cancer. The tests ordered will depend upon the type of cancer suspected. These may include the following:

- Basic Metabolic Panel
- Barium enema
- Biopsy
- Bone scan
- Bone marrow aspiration and biopsy
- Breast MRI
- Colonoscopy, Sigmoidoscopy, and/or Endoscopy
- Complete Blood Count and/or Peripheral Blood Smear
- Computed Tomography (CT) Scan
- Digital Rectal Exam
- Electrocardiogram (EKG) and Echocardiogram
- Fecal Occult Blood Tests
- Magnetic Resonance Imaging (MRI)
- Mammogram
- MUGA Scan
- Pap Test
- Positron Emission Tomography (PET) Scan
- Tumor Marker Tests

== Early Detection Technologies ==
Modern approaches to cancer detection have evolved beyond traditional symptom recognition because of new technologies that can potentially identify cancers at earlier, more treatable stages.

=== Biomarkers ===
Cancer biomarkers provide crucial information about the different states of cells when transitioning from healthy to malignant cancer conditions. Recent research has shown proof of extensive biomarker technologies that show potential for early cancer detection, primarily focusing on minimally invasive approaches. These minimally invasive approaches are being developed to complement traditional screening methods. Essentially, these modern technologies and how they can detect cancer at earlier stages rather than traditional symptom recognition, could overall potentially improve survival rates.

=== Liquid Biopsies ===
Liquid biopsies allow for minimally invasive molecular characterizations of cancers through the detection of circulating different cells and their DNA. This technology offers guidance on how these approaches could be beneficial for detection of early cancer symptoms before they actually develop, potentially leading to earlier intervention and improved outcomes.

=== Artificial Intelligence (AI) ===
Artificial intelligence (AI) applications in cancer diagnosis across clinical practices, while also keeping in mind the potential challenges, could be a beneficial impact for cancer screening and diagnostic processes. AI algorithms can analyze medical images, detect patterns in biomarker data, and help identify patients who are high-risk and may benefit from more extensive screening and applications like ai. These technologies could aim to assist healthcare professionals in screening asymptomatic patients, investigating symptomatic patients, and diagnosing cancer more effectively than just traditional methods alone.

== Treatment-related and Secondary Symptoms ==
Cancers treatments may include surgery, chemotherapy, radiation therapy, hormonal therapy, targeted therapy (including immunotherapy such as monoclonal antibody therapy) and synthetic lethality, most commonly as a series of separate treatments (e.g. chemotherapy before surgery). Some of these cancer therapies may produce treatment-related, or secondary, symptoms, including:

- Pain
  - Cancer pain may be caused by the tumor itself compressing nearby structures, impinging on nerves, or causing an inflammatory response. It may also be caused by therapies such as radiation or chemotherapy. With competent management, cancer pain can be eliminated or well controlled in 80% to 90% of cases, but nearly 50% of cancer patients in the developed world receive less than optimal care. Worldwide, nearly 80% of people with cancer receive little or no pain medication. Cancer pain in children and in people with intellectual disabilities is also reported as being under-treated.
- Infection
- Deep Vein Thrombosis
- Pulmonary Embolism
- Tumor Lysis Syndrome
- Muscle Aches

Symptoms that require immediate treatment include:

- Fever that is 100.4 °F (38 °C) or higher
- Shaking chills
- Chest pain or shortness of breath
- Confusion
- Severe headache with a stiff neck
- Bloody urine

== Cancer-related Symptom Burden ==
Cancer-related symptom burden refers to the cumulative impact of physical, psychological, and emotional symptoms—such as pain, fatigue, nausea, and emotional distress (e.g., anxiety, depression)—experienced by individuals with cancer due to the disease and its treatment. This burden encompasses both the severity of these symptoms and the patient's perception of their impact on daily life and overall well-being.

In 2013, the Eastern Cooperative Oncology Group (ECOG), informed by recommendations from an expert panel from the Center for Medical Technology Policy and comprehensive systematic reviews, established core symptoms that represent commonly reported cancer-related (including treatment-related) symptoms for the purposes of clinical research and assessment of quality of care. Individuals with breast, prostate, colorectal, and lung cancers—of all disease stages and phases of care—were represented in their large multi-center study. These symptoms include, but are not limited to:

- Fatigue/tiredness
- Disturbed sleep
- Pain
- Dry mouth
- Distress
- Numbness/tingling
- Shortness of breath
- Lack of appetite
- Sadness
- Constipation
- Diarrhea
- Nausea
- Vomiting

Other patient-reported outcomes such health-related quality of life (HRQoL), a broader construct which subjectively assesses life as a whole, may be confused with cancer-related symptom burden. Both constructs are considered when effectively defining endpoints in cancer clinical trials that share a common goal of symptom reduction. Contrary to HRQoL, cancer-related symptom burden focuses more on the impact of nonspecific, often co-occurring symptoms, and symptom clustering which are not are not monitored as closely as other toxicities within clinical settings, to ultimately inform symptom management.

Measures that assess for cancer-related symptom burden recognize that patients can experience multiple symptoms as a result of disease and/or treatment. Collectively, they can be thought of as an indicators of symptom severity and the perception of the extent to which these symptoms affect daily functioning.

=== Screening and Assessment ===
A variety of PROs are utilized to assess symptom burden among cancer patients participating in cancer clinical research. Common measures recommended due to their psychometric properties and utility in cancer clinical research include:

- Edmonton Symptom Assessment System
- Functional Assessment of Cancer Therapy - General
- Linear Analog Self-Assessment
- MD Anderson Symptom Inventory
- Memorial Symptom Assessment Scale
- Patient Care Monitor
- Patient-Reported Outcomes version of the Common Terminology Criteria for Adverse Events
- Patient-Reported Outcomes Measurement Information System
- European Organisation for Research and Treatment of Cancer Quality of Life Questionnaire
- Rotterdam Symptom Checklist
- Symptom Distress Scale

Many of these measures also have adapted versions according to specific cancer and/or illness type. In addition to clinical trials, many PROs are increasingly being collected within ambulatory care settings to inform symptom management and intervention as well as through electronic methods such as electronic patient-reported outcomes.

=== Diagnosis ===
There is no formal diagnosis for cancer-related symptom burden as it is conceptualized as a constellation of concerns commonly reported by individuals with cancer, any of which, may be endorsed at any time before, during, or after treatment and throughout the cancer control continuum.

Accurate assessment of cancer-related symptom burden requires repeatedly measuring the types, severity, and effects symptoms that patients experience throughout their cancer journey. Scientific review studies have advocated for standardization among PROs to capture this information in a consistent manner. Existing measures allow clinicians to measure the severity of symptoms and follow their progression over time to ensure timely interventions can be made to minimize any negative patient impacts.

Further, scientific reviews have identified common clusters of symptoms in cancer patients such as fatigue, pain, and depression. Identification of such clusters is important since they can contribute to increased symptom burden and negatively impact quality of life. Holistic diagnostic methods that recognize the interactions between several symptoms are important to appropriately diagnosing and treating these symptoms. Standardized PROs along with identification of common symptom clusters can help provide clinicians with the necessary information to manage symptom burden in a timely manner, thereby improving patient care and outcomes.

=== Current Interventions ===
Recent research on ePROs have provided general support for the implementation of ePRO-based interventions to improve symptom burden, quality of life, and survival among individuals with cancer. Additionally, among patients receiving specific treatments, these interventions were found to be effective in reducing symptom burden and promoting better quality of life.

A scientific review also highlighted potential non-pharmacological interventions for individuals with cancer experiencing pain concerns and facing social disparities such as identifying as an ethnic minority, having low income, and vulnerable women. This study revealed a high risk of bias across studies evaluating education, coaching, and online support group interventions and underscored the need to further investigate supportive care interventions that are responsive to the needs of individuals facial social disparities.

Another review of randomized controlled trials evaluating nursing interventions aimed at reducing symptom burden in adult cancer patients highlighted some clinically meaningful reductions in symptom burden but cautioned against making any definitive conclusions and potential generalizations regarding key components, circumstances, and target population of the interventions and called for further research.

There is also some support for the potential utility of mindfulness based interventions (MBIs) in reducing symptom burden among individuals with cancer.

=== Prognosis ===
Comprehensive review studies demonstrate that symptom burden can often persist beyond completion of primary treatment. A meta-analysis that included breast, gynecological, prostate, and colorectal cancer survivors showed that fatigue, pain, and psychological distress persisted well beyond treatment completion, ultimately impacting quality of life negatively. This in turn, highlights the need for continued symptom monitoring, management, and supportive care that is responsive to the long-term needs of cancer survivors.

Additionally, studies suggest that cancer patients with advanced disease often have several different co-occurring symptoms, which translates into a high overall burden. One scientific review revealed that pain, fatigue, and depression symptoms overlapped in a way that negatively impacted daily functioning and quality of life in these patients. Understanding and treating these symptom clusters from a holistic palliative care perspective is critical to patients' outcomes and quality of life.

The general increase observed in both symptom burden and HRQoL in late stage vs. early stage disease across 10 cancer types studied in a recent scientific review, also underscores the need for earlier detection and intervention to promote survival as well as minimize the adverse effects on symptom burden and HRQoL.

These findings underscore the need for comprehensive, ongoing symptom assessment and treatment across the cancer control continuum to improve cancer patient outcomes and reduce symptom burden.

=== Socio-cultural Considerations ===
Recent research has revealed that cancer-related symptom burden varies widely by race and ethnicity. For example, a retrospective analysis of symptom burden by race and ethnicity in a large cohort of cancer patients revealed that racial and ethnic minority patients experienced greater symptom burden than non-Hispanic White patients.

Additionally, studies on social determinants of health and symptom burden in cancer treatment suggest that marginalized cancer survivors might experience significantly greater symptom burden including higher frequency and severity, and higher levels of depression and anxiety. Supporting this notion, findings from a review that examined quality of life among U.S. Latino cancer survivors revealed that compared to other racial/ethnic communities, Hispanic/Latinos reported higher symptom burden across several HRQoL domains. Further, there is some evidence to suggest a disparity in the reporting of symptom burden within routine cancer care among individuals who identify as Black.

Overall research on potential symptom burden disparities among individuals with cancer from historically-marginalized populations is currently limited. Another recent review that examined cognitive impairment among Black, Hispanic, and Asian breast cancer survivors from the U.S. revealed that Black and Hispanic patients were more likely to report cognitive impairment concerns relative to White patients, pre and post chemotherapy. Additionally, Black cancer survivors reported greater cognitive concerns when compared to their White counterparts.
