= Electronic data capture =

Clinical data collection system

An electronic data capture (EDC) system is a computerized system designed for the collection of clinical data in electronic format for use mainly in human clinical trials. EDC replaces the traditional paper-based data collection methodology to streamline data collection and expedite the time to market for drugs and medical devices. EDC solutions are widely adopted by pharmaceutical companies and contract research organizations (CRO).

Typically, EDC systems provide:

- a graphical user interface component for data entry
- a validation component to check user data
- a de-identification component to make data less identifiable
- a reporting tool for analysis of the collected data

EDC systems are used by life sciences organizations, broadly defined as the pharmaceutical, medical device and biotechnology industries in all aspects of clinical research, but are particularly beneficial for late-phase (phase III-IV) studies and pharmacovigilance and post-market safety surveillance.

EDC can increase data accuracy and decrease the time to collect data for studies of drugs and medical devices. The trade-off that many drug developers encounter with deploying an EDC system to support their drug development is that there is a relatively high start-up process, followed by significant benefits over the duration of the trial. As a result, for an EDC to be economical the saving over the life of the trial must be greater than the set-up costs. This is often aggravated by two conditions:

1. that initial design of the study in EDC does not facilitate the decrease in costs over the life of the study due to poor planning or inexperience with EDC deployment; and
2. initial set-up costs are higher than anticipated due to initial design of the study in EDC due to poor planning or experience with EDC deployment.

The net effect is to increase both the cost and risk to the study with insignificant benefits. However, with the maturation of today's EDC solutions, much of the earlier burdens for study design and set-up have been alleviated through technologies that allow for point-and-click, and drag-and-drop design modules. With little to no programming required, and reusability from global libraries and standardized forms such as CDISC's CDASH, deploying EDC can now rival the paper processes in terms of study start-up time. As a result, even the earlier phase studies have begun to adopt EDC technology.

== History ==
EDC is often cited as having its origins in remote data entry (RDE) software, which surfaced in the life sciences market in the late 1980s and early 1990s. However, its origins might be tracked to a contract research organization known then as Institute for Biological Research and Development (IBRD). Drs. Nichol, Pickering, and Bollert offered "a controlled system for post-marketing surveillance (PMS) of newly approved (NDA) pharmaceutical products," with surveillance data being "entered into an electronic data base on site" at least as early as 1980.

Clinical research data—patient data collected during the investigation of a new drug or medical device is collected by physicians, nurses, and research study coordinators in medical settings (offices, hospitals, universities) throughout the world. Historically, this information was collected on paper forms which were then sent to the research sponsor (e.g., a pharmaceutical company) for data entry into a database and subsequent statistical analysis environment. However, this process had a number of shortcomings:

- data are copied multiple times, which produces errors
- errors that are generated are not caught until weeks later
- visibility into the medical status of patients by sponsors is delayed

To address these and other concerns, RDE systems were invented so that physicians, nurses, and study coordinators could enter the data directly at the medical setting. By moving data entry out of the sponsor site and into the clinic or other facility, a number of benefits could be derived:

- data checks could be implemented during data entry (real-time), preventing some errors altogether and immediately prompting for resolution of other errors
- data could be transmitted nightly to sponsors, thereby improving the sponsor's ability to monitor the progress and status of the research study and its patients

These early RDE systems used "thick client" software—software installed locally on a laptop computer's hardware—to collect the patient data. The system could then use a modem connection over an analog phone line to periodically transmit the data back to the sponsor, and to collect questions from the sponsor that the medical staff would need to answer.

Though effective, RDE brought with it several shortcomings as well. The most significant shortcoming was that hardware (e.g., a laptop computer) needed to be deployed, installed, and supported at every investigational (medical) site. This became expensive for sponsors and complicated for medical staff. Usability and space constraints led to a lot of dissatisfaction among medical practitioners. With the rise of the internet in the mid-1990s, the obvious solution to some of these issues was the adoption of web-based software that could be accessed using existing computers at the investigational sites. EDC represents this new class of software.

== Current landscape ==
The EDC landscape has continued to evolve from its evolution from RDE in the late 1990s. Today, the market consists of a variety of new and established software providers. Many of these providers offer specialized solutions targeting certain customer profiles or study phases. Modern features of EDC now include features like cloud data storage, role-based permissions, and case report form designers, as well as clinical trials analytics, interactive dashboards, and electronic medical record integration.

== Future ==
In 2013, the U.S. Food and Drug Administration (FDA) introduced its eSource guidance, which suggests methods of capturing clinical trial data electronically from the very beginning and moving it to the cloud, as opposed to EDC's more traditional method of capturing data initially on paper and transcribing it into the EDC system. Adoption of eSource was initially slow, with the FDA producing a webinar in July 2015 to further promote the guidance. Efforts like the TransCelerate eSource Initiative (in 2016) have been founded "to facilitate the understanding of the eSource landscape and the optimal use of electronic data sources in the industry to improve global clinical science and global clinical trial execution for stakeholders." A 2017 study by the Tufts Center for the Study of Drug Development suggested that with the following three years a "majority of [surveyed clinical information] companies" (growing from 38 percent to 84 percent) planned to incorporate eSource data. With 87 percent of research sites (2017) stating that eSource would be "helpful" or "very helpful" if integrated with today's EDC, a shift away from EDC (or EDC taking a more complementary role) may be possible.

== See also ==
- Clinical data acquisition
- Clinical data management system (CDMS)
- Case report form (CRF)
- Remote data entry (RDE)
- Remote data capture (RDC)
- Patient-reported outcome (PRO)
- Use of esource in clinical trials
- Electronic patient-reported outcome (ePRO)
- Title 21 CFR Part 11
- Mobile forms
