= José María Valderas Martínez =

José María Valderas Martinez
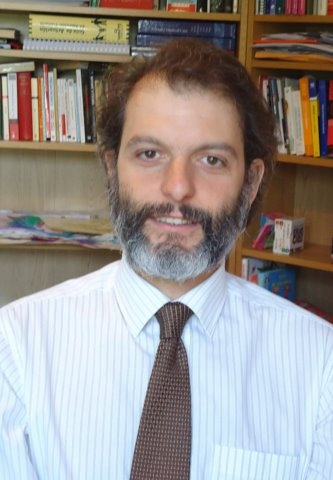
- Born: 1 April 1972 (age 54); Barcelona, Spain

Academic background
- Education: University of Barcelona
- Website: discovery.nus.edu.sg/19962-jose-m-valderas

Professor José María Valderas Martínez (for research purposes also known as Jose M Valderas) (born 1 April 1972 in Barcelona, Spain) is an Academic General Practitioner and health services researcher.

He graduated in medicine from the University of Barcelona in 1997, and qualified as a General Practitioner in 2003. Both his PhD (on the routine use of Patient Reported Outcomes in clinical practice) and MPH (development of a tool for the standardized assessment of Patient Reported Outcomes measures) were completed at the Health Services Research Unit at the Institut Municipal d'Investigació Mèdica (IMIM - Hospital del Mar). He subsequently worked with Barbara Starfield as a post-doctoral Research Fellow at the Department of Health Policy and Management, Johns Hopkins University. Later he went on to take a post as Clinical Lecturer at the National Primary Care Research and Development Centre and the National Institute for Health and Care Research (NIHR) School of Primary Care Research at the University of Manchester. He subsequently moved to the Nuffield Department of Primary Care Health Sciences, University of Oxford, where he set up and led the Health Services and Policy Research group. He moved in 2013 to the University of Exeter Medical School, where he took up the chair in Health Services and Policy. In 2021 he was appointed Head of the Department in Family Medicine at the National University Health System and the National University of Singapore and in 2022 as Director of the NUS Centre for Health Systems Performance. He is also Adj. Professor at the Department of Community & Family Medicine at the University of Toronto and Hon. Professor at the University of Exeter.

His research is focused on the routine use of Patient Reported Outcomes and other patient-centred measures in clinical practice, the study of the implications of multimorbidity for the provision of health services, the evaluation of interventions aimed at quality improvement of health care and policies for primary health care. He has led the development of an integrated model of quality of life and other Patient Reported Outcomes, the Overall Adult Health Outcomes Set for the International Consortium for Health Outcome Measurement (ICHOM)., the OECD Patient Reported Indicators Survey (PaRIS) patient questionnaire, the WHO Patient Reported Experience Measure-Primary Care suite of tools, and the Patient Reported Experiences and Outcomes of Safety in Primary Care.

He was elected by his peers as President of the International Society for Quality of Life Research, (2017-2019) and subsequently chairman of the World Organization of Family Doctors (WONCA) Working Party in Quality and Safety. (2021-2025). In 2025 he was elected chairman of the World Organization of Family Doctors (WONCA) Working Party in Research.

He is founding Field Chief Editor of Frontiers in Health Services and has previously served as an Associate Editor to the European Journal of General Practice in the period 2010-2018 and to Quality of Life Research 2008–2011. He has held visiting appointments as Senior Research Fellow at the London School of Economics (2010-2013), Fellow at the European Observatory of Health Systems and Policies (2010-2013), Visiting Scientist at the University of Paris-Cité (2022) and Scholar at the University of Sydney (2011) and the University of Cape Town (2026).

He was one of the key contributors to the new vision for the World Health Organization Astana Declaration of Primary Health Care.

== Publications ==
Some of his most cited papers include:

- "Epidemiology and impact of multimorbidity in primary care: a retrospective cohort study." by C Salisbury, L Johnson, S Purdy, JM Valderas, AA Montgomery. British Journal of General Practice 61 (582), e12-e21 PMID 21401985.
- "Defining comorbidity: Implications for understanding health and health services." by Valderas, J.M., Starfield, B., Sibbald, B., Salisbury, C., Roland, M. Annals of Family Medicine Volume 7, Issue 4, July–August 2005, Pages 357-363 doi:10.1370/afm.983 PMID 19597174.
- "The impact of measuring patient-reported outcomes in clinical practice: A systematic review of the literature" by Valderas, J. M., Kotzeva, A., Espallargues, M., Guyatt, G., Ferrans, C.E., Halyard, M.Y., Revicki, D.A., Symonds, T., Parada, A., Alonso, J Quality of Life Research Volume 17, Issue 2, March 2008, Pages 179-193 PMID 18175207.
- "Patient reported outcome measures: a model-based classification system for research and clinical practice" by Valderas, J. M., Alonso, J Quality of Life Research Volume 17, Issue 9, November 2008, Pages 1125-1135 PMID 18836850.
