= Mpro =

Mpro may refer to:

- Electronic patient-reported outcome
- SARS coronavirus main proteinase, an enzyme
