= Red Hat (disambiguation) =

Red Hat is an American software company that provides open source software products. Red Hat may also refer to:

- MAGA hat, a usually red political hat
- Operation Red Hat, a 1971 United States movement of chemical warfare munitions
- Red Hat, a site in Project 112, an American biological and chemical weapon experimentation project
- Red Hat sect, three different schools of Tibetan Buddhism
- Red Hat Society, a women's social organization
- Red Hat Cell Block, a former prison cell block at the Louisiana State Penitentiary
- Red hat, one of de Bono's Six Thinking Hats
- Red hat, a trainee in a volunteer fire department
- Red Hat Enterprise Linux
- Red Hat Linux

== See also ==
- Redcap (disambiguation)
- Red beret, a military beret worn by many military police forces
- Galero, a red hat traditionally worn by cardinals of the Catholic Church
- Zucchetto, a small, hemispherical, form-fitting ecclesiastical skullcap
- Make America Great Again
