= REDCap =

Browser-based data capture software for academic research

- Developer: Vanderbilt University
- Initial release: August 2004; 21 years ago
- Stable release: v14.1.2
- Written in: PHP
- Operating system: Unix-like, Windows, Linux
- Type: Research software, Clinical trial, CRF software
- Website: projectredcap.org

REDCap (Research Electronic Data Capture) is a browser-based, metadata-driven EDC software and workflow methodology for designing clinical and translational research databases. It is widely used in the academic research community: the REDCap Consortium is a collaborative, international network of more than 5900 institutional partners in 145 countries, with more than 2.1 million total end-users employing the software. Over 19,000 journal articles cite REDCap.

== History ==
REDCap was developed by an informatics team at Vanderbilt University with ongoing support from NCRR and NIH grants and first released in 2004. REDCap was designed to address common problems for academic biomedical researchers hoping to use electronic databases. First, major vendor electronic data capture and clinical data management system software is designed and priced for large clinical trials, and can be prohibitively expensive for investigator-initiated studies or other such studies at a smaller scale. Second, the independent research environment often lacks the informatics and other multidisciplinary support necessary for effective IT integration into research protocols. The REDCap software as distributed through the REDCap consortium attempts to facilitate informatics support for clinical researchers and foster a collaborative network of institutional researchers who share and support REDCap as a common research tool.

== Software licensing and intended use ==
Although REDCap is available at no charge to institutional partners – discounting the cost of internal IT support staffing – REDCap is expressly not open-source software. Certain end-user license agreements distinguish it from a typical open-source license. Namely, the software is restricted in use, permitted only for non-commercial research purposes. REDCap is also restricted in redistribution because Vanderbilt is the only entity that can distribute it. Furthermore, any and all derived works – such as innovations or programmatic features added on by the user – are essentially owned by Vanderbilt. Vanderbilt catalogues such derived works in their REDCap Consortium library, which is available to all consortium members. The REDCap End-User License Agreement also encompasses control by Vanderbilt over its licensees' publications on or about REDCap, specifying that Vanderbilt shall coordinate and have editorial control over any "publications created by CONSORTIUM MEMBERS which discuss the SOFTWARE and its methodologies, functionality, and/or abilities." Publications that describe scientific studies which have utilized REDCap are exempt from these editorial restrictions.

The REDCap software is distributed from Vanderbilt to institutional consortium partners, who in turn give research teams access to REDCap. REDCap project design has an intended workflow outlined by the developers. Upon request, the informatics core gives the research team a demonstration of REDCap, highlighting the most relevant user interface features. The researchers then fill out a Microsoft Excel spreadsheet file with key metadata (i.e. field name, data-type, data range, etc.) about each measurement in their CRF. The informatics core converts this spreadsheet template into study-specific database tables which are linked to a working web-based EDC forms and applications environment. The researchers then test this prototype web application by filling out dummy data, and the metadata spreadsheet is revised and refined in an iterative process. Once the REDCap project design is finalized, the application is deployed from development to production mode, all dummy data is lost, and researchers begin committing actual patient data.

The REDCap design workflow exhibits certain limitations that merit consideration. Once a project enters production mode, revisions to the database design require approval from the informatics core. Additionally, specific alterations to production mode are not permissible. For instance, the REDCap calendar tool precludes production mode revisions to calendar metadata, thereby necessitating researchers to exercise caution when creating metadata and event-handlers, to avoid committing to the inflexibility of production mode.

== Data Architecture and Compliance ==
REDCap employs a metadata-driven architecture. Study variables are defined in a data dictionary, including variable names, data types, and allowed values. The system uses this metadata to generate electronic case report forms and the database structure automatically. This method accelerates the development of data collection tools, ensures consistency and standardization, reduces errors, and facilitates data management in clinical research and academic research.

REDCap includes security and compliance features to protect sensitive research data. It implements role-based user access, assigning permissions according to each user’s project role. This ensures that only authorized individuals can view or edit specific data. The system maintains audit trails, recording who made changes and when they happened. This supports modification tracking and accountability. Additionally, it logs all activities, helping institutions meet regulatory data protection standards. These features facilitate compliance with regulations such as the HIPAA in the United States, which governs personal health information.
