= Patient diary =

Method of monitoring a medical condition or treatment

A patient diary is a tool used during a clinical trial or a disease treatment to assess the patient's condition (e.g. symptom severity, quality of life) or to measure treatment compliance. An electronic patient diary registers the data in a storage device and allows for automatically monitoring the time the entry was made.

Frequent recording of symptoms using a diary helps to reduce recall bias. Electronic diaries ensure entries are made as scheduled, and not, for example, in a batch immediately before the clinic visit.

Patient diaries are also way to find out if a patient takes the medication according to the treatment schedule, which is an important problem during clinical trials and the treatment of degenerative diseases with relatively few symptoms.

== See also ==
- Case report form
- Electronic patient reported outcomes (ePRO)
- Patient-reported outcome
