= RDE =

RDE may refer to:

- Redundant data elimination, the process of reducing file storage requirements through data deduplication
- Revue d'Égyptologie, a scholarly journal of Egyptology (commonly abbreviated RdE)
- Rotating detonation engine, a rocket engine that uses continuous detonation to provide thrust.
- Rotating disk electrode, a type of electrode used in electrochemistry
- Remote data entry, a process for the collection of data in electronic format
- European Democratic Alliance (Rassemblement des Démocrates Européens), a political group in the European Parliament 1984–1995.
- European Democratic and Social Rally group, formerly the Democratic and European Rally group (groupe du Rassemblement démocratique et européen), a parliamentary group in the French Senate
- Real Driving Emissions, see European emission standards.
