= E-Pro (disambiguation) =

"E-Pro" is a 2005 song by Beck from Guero.

E-Pro may also refer to:

- e-Pro (certification), an Internet certification program for real estate agents
- Electronic patient-reported outcome or ePRO, a patient-reported outcome that is collected by electronic methods
