= Cancer sign =

Cancer sign may refer to:

- Cancer (astrology)
- Signs and symptoms of cancer
