= CSDD =

CSDD may refer to:

- Corporate Sustainability Due Diligence Directive, a proposed directive in EU law relating to corporate environmental goals
- the Tufts Center for the Study of Drug Development, a non-profit organization based at Tufts University in Boston.
- the Road Traffic Safety Directorate, the Latvian national department of motor vehicles
