= Oxford Knee Score =

Patient reported outcome questionnaire

The Oxford Knee Score (OKS) is a Patient Reported Outcome questionnaire that was developed to specifically assess the patient's perspective of outcome following Total Knee Arthroplasty. The OKS has subsequently been validated for use in assessing other non-surgical therapies applied to those suffering from issues with the knee. The OKS consists of twelve questions covering function and pain associated with the knee. It was designed and developed by researchers within the department of Public Health and Primary Health Care at the University of Oxford in association with surgical colleagues at the Nuffield Orthopaedic Centre. The benefit to this questionnaire is that it is short, practical, reliable, valid and sensitive to clinically important changes over time.

The Oxford Knee Score is owned, managed and supported by Isis Outcomes, an activity within Isis Innovation Ltd, the Technology Transfer Company for the University of Oxford.

== Score Evaluation ==
The original evaluation of the Oxford Knee Score was as follows:

First, each of the 12 answers are assigned the previously defined number of points. They range from 1 = least difficult to 5 = most difficult. The 12 ratings are then added together to give a total score used to assess the patient. The possible total score ranges from 12 to 60 points. Here, a low score (e.g. 12 points) indicates good outcomes and vice versa.

Because of misunderstandings concerning this, the right holders proposed a different system where response points range from 0 to 4 with a total score range from 0 to 48. Here, a high score (e.g. 48) indicates satisfactory joint function and vice versa.

Both scoring systems remain valid. To avoid misinterpretation one should always show the scoring system used.
