= Louis Lasagna =

American physician and professor of medicine (1923–2003)

- Born: February 22, 1923; Queens, New York, U.S.
- Died: August 6, 2003 (aged 80); Auburndale, Massachusetts, U.S.
- Occupations: physician, professor
- Known for: revision of the Hippocratic Oath
- Spouse: Helen Lasagna
- Children: 7

Louis Cesare Lasagna (February 22, 1923 – August 6, 2003) was an American physician and professor of medicine, known for his revision of the Hippocratic Oath.

== Early life and education ==
Lasagna was an internationally recognized and respected expert in clinical pharmacology. Born in Queens, New York in 1923, Lasagna was raised in New Brunswick, New Jersey, by his Italian immigrant parents, and graduated from New Brunswick High School. He graduated from Rutgers University in 1943 and earned his medical degree from Columbia University in 1947. During his time at Rutgers University, he joined Kappa Sigma Fraternity (Gamma-Upsilon). After completing a clinical research fellowship in anesthesia at Harvard Medical School, Lasagna joined the faculty of Johns Hopkins University in 1954, where he established the first ever clinical pharmacology department. Lasagna taught medicine and pharmacology at Johns Hopkins until 1970, when he accepted the position as the first chairman of the Department of Pharmacology and Toxicology at the University of Rochester's, School of Medicine and Dentistry, which he held for the next decade (1970–1980). Early in his fourteen-year career at Rochester, Lasagna founded the Center for the Study of Drug Development, later called the Tufts Center for the Study of Drug Development. In July 1984, the Center moved with Lasagna to Tufts University, where he became dean of the Sackler School of Graduate Biomedical Sciences.

While living in Rochester, Lasagna was also active in the city's cultural life, serving as the President of the Rochester Philharmonic Orchestra, supporting the Garth Fagan Dance company, and writing, directing, and starring in the "Mighty Lasagna Players" annual theater production by the University of Rochester, Department of Pharmacology Medical and Toxicology students and faculty.

== Revision of Hippocratic oath ==
Throughout Lasagna's career he wrote and lectured extensively on a variety of topics. He was well known for his simple eloquence, as well as his sense of humor and humanity in addressing such controversial topics as birth control, abortion, euthanasia, and medical experimentation on humans. In 1964, Lasagna wrote a modernized version of the Hippocratic Oath, which emphasized a holistic and compassionate approach to medicine. Today, the "Lasagna Oath" has been adopted by many medical colleges.

== The Doctors' Dilemmas ==
Lasagna was the author of the book The Doctors' Dilemmas (1963). It was described in a review as an "unusually readable account of the complex development of medical practice from a confusion of superstition and ignorance in its earliest days down to its present." In one chapter, Lasagna had criticized popular alternative medicine ideas and famous quacks such as Franz Mesmer and Elisha Perkins.

== Involvement with US federal drug regulation ==
In addition to updating the Hippocratic oath, Lasagna figured prominently in the conceptualization of controlled clinical trials and the placebo effect. He served as a consultant to, and headed, several Federal commissions on Federal drug approval. Lasagna's work led to the improvement of controlled clinical trials to test drug effectiveness, and improved the regulation of drugs for effectiveness and safety.

In 1962 Lasagna delivered testimony to Congress during the Kefauver hearings on the 1962 amendments to the Food, Drug and Cosmetic Act. His guidance resulted in, among other things, the requirement for controlled clinical trials as necessary for proving drug effectiveness as a condition for regulatory approval of a new drug which resulted in major improvements in the evidentiary standard in the Food and Drug Administration (FDA) and the pharmaceutical industry. This was the first prescription drug law in the world to specify the criteria for proving effectiveness, and other countries soon followed suit. It may be the largest single advance in the standards and outcome of medical therapy of all time.

Among the subsequent committees that Lasagna served on were: the National Committee to Review Procedures for the Approval of New Cancer and AIDS Drugs, the "blue ribbon" panel to examine the FDA, and the "Rogers Group" aimed at reforming drug regulation processes.

== Academic accolades ==
Lasagna's numerous honors and awards include honorary Sc.D. degrees from Hahnemann Medical School (1980) and Rutgers University (1983); and an honorary doctoral degree from the University of Alcalá in Spain (1998).

== Death ==
Lasagna died in August 2003 of lymphoma. He was survived by his wife Helen and his seven children.

== Archives ==
Lasagna's letters and manuscripts are archived at the University of Rochester.

This article incorporates information from the archive, with written permission.

== Publications ==
- The Doctors' Dilemmas (1963)
- Life, Death, and the Doctor (1968)
- Obesity: Causes, Consequences, and Treatment (1974)
- Regulation and Drug Development (1975)
- Innovation and Acceleration in Clinical Drug Development (1987)
- Phenylpropanolamine: A Review (1988)
