= Cambridge Pulmonary Hypertension Outcome Review =

The Cambridge Pulmonary Hypertension Outcome Review (CAMPHOR) is a disease specific patient-reported outcome measure which assesses quality of life of patients with pulmonary hypertension (PH). It was the first pulmonary hypertension specific questionnaire for assessing patient reported symptoms, quality of life and functioning.

== History ==
The CAMPHOR questionnaire was developed by Galen Research in 2006 to allow for cost-utility analyses for treatments of PH. The theoretical basis for the CAMPHOR is the needs-based model of quality of life, which states that quality of life is highest when an individual has the ability and capacity to satisfy their own needs.

== Properties ==
The CAMPHOR is made up of 3 main dimensions which assess symptoms, functioning and quality of life (QoL). The symptom dimension is made up of 25 symptoms and is broken up into 3 subscales: energy, breathlessness and mood. The QoL scale has 25 items which focus on socialization, role, acceptance, self-esteem, independence, and security. The activity scale has 15 items. Response options include true and not true. Scores for QoL and symptoms range from 0–25, with higher scores indicating worse quality of life. Activity scores range from 0–30, with higher scores indicating more physical limitations.

== Language Adaptations and Validations ==
Since the development of the CAMPHOR, it has been translated and validated into fourteen different languages, including Australian and New Zealand English, German and Swedish.

== Use in Clinical Trials ==
The Cambridge Pulmonary Hypertension Outcome Review has been a useful tool in clinical trials as it allows researchers to assess whether new medication or therapy is effective. The CAMPHOR has been utilized in clinical trials which investigate the effects of treprostinil, as well as trials which investigate sildenafil.
