= Remote data entry =

A remote data entry (RDE) system is a computerized system designed for the collection of data in electronic format. The term is most commonly applied to a class of software used in the life sciences industry for collecting patient data from participants in clinical research studies—research of new drugs and or medical devices.

Typically, RDE systems provide:

- a graphical user interface component for data entry.
- a validation component to check user data.
- a reporting tool for analysis of the collected data.

The development of RDE systems started in the mid- to late-1980s as software installed locally on portable computers with modems. It has largely been replaced by a newer generation of software called electronic data capture, or EDC, that provides the same type of functionality over the Internet using web pages.

== See also ==
- Clinical data acquisition
- Electronic data capture, provides a brief history of the RDE and EDC software landscape, remote jobs.
