= Psoriatic Arthritis Quality of Life =

Medical questionnaire

The Psoriatic Arthritis Quality of Life (PsAQoL) measure is a disease specific patient-reported outcome measure which measures the effect that psoriatic arthritis has on a patient's quality of life.

It is a self-administered, 20-item questionnaire that takes about three minutes to complete. The answers are restricted to true or false.

== Development ==
The PsAQoL was first published in 2004 by Galen Research. The development of the measure was a joint effort between Galen Research, the University of Leeds and St. Vincent's University Hospital in Dublin. The study was funded by the Arthritis Research Campaign in the UK.

Qualitative interviews were conducted with 48 patients, after which a 51-item questionnaire was created. A follow-up survey with 94 patients was then conducted which reduced the items to 35. An additional 286 patients were surveyed and Rasch analysis was performed, which finalized the PsAQoL to 20 items. A high score on the PsAQoL indicates a lower quality of life.

== International Use ==
The Psoriatic Arthritis Quality of Life measure has been translated into 30 languages, other than UK English. These languages include Dutch and Swedish. The PsAQoL has also been utilized in clinical research studies in order to determine whether a medication or treatment is effective in treating psoriatic arthritis. If the scores on the PsAQoL change after treatment, this means that the given treatment has had an effect on quality of life. The PsAQoL has been used to evaluate infliximab and adalimumab.
