= Unidimensional Fatigue Impact Scale =

Measurement for fatigue

The Unidimensional Fatigue Impact Scale (U-FIS) is a disease-specific patient-reported outcome measure which measures the impact of multiple sclerosis–related fatigue. It is a 22-item unidimensional scale which is based on needs-based quality of life theory.

== Background ==
The U-FIS was developed by Galen Research and published in 2009. It was derived from the Fatigue Impact Scale, a scale identified by the Multiple Sclerosis Council for Clinical Practice Guidelines “as the most appropriate for assessing the impact of MS-related fatigue on quality of life”.

Data from the FIS went through Rasch analysis and additional items were added from interviews with multiple sclerosis patients. The U-FIS was then tested for validity via patient interviews and a validation survey.

== International Use ==
The U-FIS has been translated and validated into eight different language versions: Canadian English, Canadian French, German, Swedish, Italian, French, US English and Spanish.

It has been recommended for use in determining fatigue impact by an independent meta analysis and has also been utilized in a study investigating the role of neuroticism, perfectionism and depression in chronic fatigue syndrome.
