= Asthma Life Impact Scale =

- Purpose: measures asthma effect on quality of life

The Asthma Life Impact Scale (ALIS) measure is a disease-specific patient reported outcome questionnaire which assesses the impact that asthma has on a patient’s quality of life.

The questionnaire has 22 items, which goes beyond earlier focus on the symptoms, functioning and environmental triggers of asthma and includes emotional issues.

== Development ==
The ALIS was developed simultaneously in the UK and in the US via interviews and focus groups. It was developed and published in 2010 by Galen Research, and was funded by Novartis AG. It was the first asthma specific quality of life measure that was developed using Item Response Theory. Items that were featured on the ALIS include: “asthma restricts my social activities”; “asthma affect my close relationships”, “my illness controls me” and “my asthma affects my interest in sex”.

== International use ==
Currently, the ALIS has been translated into 16 different languages, including Russian and Italian.
