= Case report form =

Document in clinical trial research

A case report form (or CRF) is a paper or electronic questionnaire specifically used in clinical trial research. The case report form is the tool used by the sponsor of the clinical trial to collect data from each participating patient. All data on each patient participating in a clinical trial are held and/or documented in the CRF, including adverse events.

The sponsor of the clinical trial develops the CRF to collect the specific data they need in order to test their hypotheses or answer their research questions. The size of a CRF can range from a handwritten one-time 'snapshot' of a patient's physical condition to hundreds of pages of electronically captured data obtained over a period of weeks or months. (It can also include required check-up visits months after the patient's treatment has stopped.)

The sponsor is responsible for designing a CRF that accurately represents the protocol of the clinical trial, as well as managing its production, monitoring the data collection and auditing the content of the filled-in CRFs.

In this case, this is a wrong case. Case report forms contain data obtained during the patient's participation in the clinical trial. Before being sent to the sponsor, this data is usually de-identified (not traceable to the patient) by removing the patient's name, medical record number, etc., and giving the patient a unique study number. The supervising Institutional Review Board (IRB) oversees the release of any personally identifiable data to the sponsor.

From the sponsor's point of view, the main logistic goal of a clinical trial is to obtain accurate CRFs. However, because of human and machine error, the data entered in CRFs is rarely completely accurate or entirely readable. To combat these errors monitors are usually hired by the sponsor to audit the CRF to make sure the CRF contains the correct data.

When the study administrators or automated mechanisms process the CRFs that were sent to the sponsor by local researchers, they make a note of queries. Queries are non-sensible or questionable data that must be explained. Examples of data that would lead to a query: a male patient being on female birth control medication or having had an abortion, or a 15-year-old participant having had hip replacement surgery. Each query has to be resolved by the individual attention of a member of each local research team, as well as an individual in the study administration. To ensure quality control, these queries are usually addressed and resolved before the CRF data is included by the sponsor in the final clinical study report. Depending on variables relating to the nature of the study, (e.g., the health of the study population), the effectiveness of the study administrators in resolving these queries can significantly impact the cost of studies.

== eCRF ==
Originally all case report forms were made on paper. But recently there is a changing trend to perform clinical studies using an electronic case report form (eCRF). This way of working has many advantages:

- Faster and more efficient
- High security
- Environmentally friendly

== See also ==
- Clinical data acquisition
- Clinical research associate (CRA)
- Clinical trial protocol
- Data clarification form
- Data collection system
- Drug development
- Electronic data capture
- Patient diary
- Patient-reported outcome
