= The Quality of Life Assessment of Growth Hormone Deficiency in Adults Measure =

Medical questionnaire

The Quality of Life Assessment of Growth Hormone Deficiency in Adults (QoL-AGHDA) is a disease specific patient-reported outcome measure which measures the effect growth hormone deficiency has on adult patients. The score of the QoL-AGHDA is used to determine the extent to which growth hormone deficiency has affected the patient’s quality of life, and what treatment can then be administered. A high score on the QoL-AGHDA indicates that the patient suffers from many symptoms and therefore has a lower quality of life.

The questionnaire consists of 25 “Yes” or “No” items and is self-administered, meaning that the patient can complete the survey on their own. The QoL-AGHDA addresses seven different areas of concern for growth hormone deficient (GHD) patients. They are: body image and fat distribution, energy level, concentration and memory, irritability and temper, strength and stamina, coping with stress, and physical and mental drive.

== History and language adaptation ==
The QoL-AGHDA was published in 1999 and was funded by Pharmacia & Upjohn AB, Sweden. The research company that developed the QoL-AGHDA was Galen Research. The measure was originally created for use in UK English, Swedish, Italian, German and Spanish, but later on it was also adapted for the United States, Belgium, the Netherlands, Brazil and Denmark. Subsequent to that, the QoL-AGHDA was translated into Czech, Polish, Serbian and Slovakian.

== Clinical and scientific use ==
The QoL-AGHDA has been used in numerous clinical practice and research studies worldwide. It is also utilized by the Pfizer International Metabolic Database (KIMS), which monitors treatment and growth hormone replacement therapy outcomes internationally. Additionally, the questionnaire is used by the National Institute for Health and Care Excellence (NICE) in the UK. NICE has recommended that somatropin hormone treatment may be given to a patient only if they meet three criteria; they have a severe growth hormone deficiency, they are already receiving full replacement with other deficient pituitary hormones as they need it and they have a score of at least 11 on the QoL-AGHDA. It is also recommended that the patient’s quality of life is reassessed using the Qol-AGHDA nine months after starting therapy, and if their score is not improved by at least seven points the treatment must be discontinued. This was the first time a quality of life measure was used to determine whether treatment should be given for a specific disease.
