= Patient Reported Outcome Indices for Multiple Sclerosis =

Medical research tool

The Patient Reported Outcome Indices for Multiple Sclerosis (PRIMUS) is a disease specific patient-reported outcome questionnaire which measures the quality of life (QoL) of patients with multiple sclerosis.

The measure contains an assessment of quality of life, activity limitations and symptoms. A higher score on any or all of these scales indicates a lower quality of life due to the disease.

== History and properties ==
First published in 2009 by Galen Research and funded by Novartis Pharmaceuticals, the PRIMUS was developed in order to provide a more holistic view of the impact of MS on a patient.

The measure has three scales: quality of life, symptoms and activity limitations, which are designed to be used together or as standalone measures. The QoL and symptom scales are based on simple statements with dichotomous response options. Each scale has a total score which ranges from 0 to 22. The activity scale is based on 15 statements describing tasks. Patients are asked to rate their ability to perform these tasks on a scale from 1 to 3. The total score of the activities section ranges from 0 to 30.

== International use ==
Since the development of the PRIMUS, it has been translated into several languages including Canadian English and French, French, German, Italian, Spanish, Swedish, US English, Australian and New Zealand English and US Spanish. This has allowed researchers to conduct studies for specific populations, such as Spain and Europe.

== Clinical studies ==
The PRIMUS has been utilized in clinical trials which assess the efficacy of a treatment or medication. If a patient's score on the PRIMUS changes after a trial has taken place, it is inferred that the trial has had an effect on the patient's quality of life. PRIMUS has been used to assess the efficacy of fingolimod and rivastigmine.
