= Clario =

American technology company

CLARIO
- Type: Private
- Industry: Healthcare; Clinical Research; Pharmaceutical Service; Medical Technology
- Founded: 1972
- Headquarters: Philadelphia, U.S.
- Key people: Christopher Fikry, M.D.(CEO)
- Revenue: $350 million to $400 million (USD) per year
- Owner: Privately Owned
- Number of employees: 1001 to 5000 employees (2024)
- Website: clario.com

CLARIO, formerly ERT and Bioclinica, is a technology company specializing in clinical services and customizable medical devices to biopharmaceutical and healthcare organizations. It offers centralized cardiac safety and respiratory efficacy services in drug development and also collects, analyzes and distributes electronic patient-reported outcomes (ePRO) in multiple modalities across all phases of clinical research.

== Operations ==
Clario provides technology and services for collecting and analyzing clinical trial data used to evaluate the safety and effectiveness of treatments. Its services cover electronic clinical outcome assessments, medical imaging, cardiac safety, and respiratory measurements. Its technology has been used in approximately 26,000 clinical trials and has supported studies associated with about 70 percent of drug approvals in the United States.

== History ==
In 2008, ERT acquired Biosigna, a Munich-based company, which specialized in biomedical signal processing.

In 2009, ERT ended its foray into the electronic data capture (EDC) business as ERT sold its EDC division for approximately $2.025 million of OmniComm shares.

In 2010, ERT acquired the Research Services Division of the CareFusion Corporation. This nearly doubled the company in size and brought a new service line and enhancements to its two current service offerings; Respiratory Services, specializing in centralized spirometry, Multi-Mode ePRO for patient reported outcomes, and enhanced Cardiac Safety Solutions. Along with the acquisition, ERT now has the capability to design and construct their own clinical diagnostic devices from a manufacturing facility in Estenfeld, Germany.

In 2010, the then-current CEO of ERT was replaced on an interim basis by Joel Morganroth, M.D.

In 2011, Jeffrey S. Litwin, M.D. was appointed ERT's new president and chief executive officer. Litwin joined ERT in 2000 as senior vice president and chief medical officer and was subsequently promoted in December 2005 to executive vice president and chief medical officer. Dr. Litwin oversaw ERT's global cardiac safety operations for seven years.

On July 3, 2012, ERT announced that Genstar Capital LLC of San Francisco acquired ERT in a take-private transaction valued at approximately $400 million.

In November 2014, ERT acquired eClinical Insights (eCI), a provider of cloud-based clinical trials management software.

On February 27, 2015, ERT acquired PHT Corporation (PHT).

In March 2016, ERT was acquired by Nordic Capital, a private healthcare investment firm for about $1.8 billion.

In December 2016, ERT acquired Exco InTouch, a provider of patient engagement, data capture and digital health solutions.

In May 2017, ERT acquired ImageIQ, clinical trial biomedical imaging and analysis company.

In September 2017, ERT acquired Biomedical Systems (BMS), a provider of imaging as well as cardiac safety and respiratory data collection solutions.

In December 2017, ERT acquired iCardiac Technologies, a global provider of centralized cardiac safety, respiratory, and electronic clinical outcome assessment (eCOA) solutions that accelerate clinical research.

In June 2020, ERT acquired APDM Wearable Technologies, a next-generation provider of wearables and digital biomarkers.

In December 2020, ERT announced a merger with Bioclinica, a global clinical trial end-point solutions company, with Joe Eazor to be its head. In November 2021, following the merger, the company renamed itself to Clario.

In April 2024, it was announced Clario had acquired the Leuven, Belgium-headquartered AI medical technology company, ArtiQ.

In October 2025, Thermo Fisher Scientific announced an agreement to acquire Clario for $8.88 billion in cash from a shareholder group including Novo Holdings. The transaction was expected to close in mid-2026. The acquisition was completed on March 24, 2026, with Clario becoming part of Thermo Fisher's Laboratory Products and Biopharma Services segment.
