= Redcap (disambiguation) =

A redcap is a goblin in Northumbrian folklore.

Redcap, RedCap or red cap may also refer to:

== Geography ==
- Red Cap, California, a former mining camp in Klamath County, California

== Mission ==
- Redcap, a real rescue mission assigned to the Civil Air Patrol, as contrasted with a SARCAP, a practice mission.

== Birds ==
- Derbyshire Redcap, a chicken breed usually known as the Redcap
- European goldfinch, a small passerine bird in the finch family

== Uniforms with red caps ==
- Nickname for a Royal Military Police officer in the British Army
- Porter (railroad) at a railway station (Canadian or American English)
- Skycap, a porter at an airport
- Jacksonville Red Caps, a Negro league baseball team
- Bonnets Rouges, 21st century French protest movement
- Nickname for the Chapelgorris, a type of volunteer unit during the Spanish First Carlist War
- Nickname for the Requetés, a type of volunteer unit during the Spanish Civil War

== Brands and products ==
- Red Cap Ale, a brand of the Brick Brewing Company
- REDCAP, a mission designation of the Civil Air Patrol
- REDCap (Research Electronic Data Capture)
- RED CAP, AirAsia airline call sign
- Red Kap is an American workwear company.

== Books ==
- Little Red Cap is an alternate title for the fairy tale Little Red Riding Hood.
  - Little Red Cap (poem), is an adaptation by Carol Ann Duffy.
- Red Cap (book), a 1991 historical fiction book by G. Clifton Wisler
- Redcap (novel), a 2006 novel by the author Brian Callison

== Film and TV ==
- Redcap (TV series), a 1964 British television series, starring John Thaw
- Red Cap (TV series), a 2001 British television series, starring Tamzin Outhwaite
- Red Caps (TV series), a 2011 Italian-Finnish television series

== Other ==
- "Redcap", slang appellation for supporters of the Make America Great Again movement, as red caps with this slogan are frequently worn
- REDCap (Research Electronic Data Capture), a software solution and workflow methodology
- NR RedCap (New Radio Reduced Capability), a telecommunication standard
- Red Cap Garage, a former gay bar in Portland, Oregon
- Redcap, cultural reference, from the song by Blue Öyster Cult "Before The Kiss, A Redcap". The term "redcap" was supposedly slang for a type of barbiturate; however, "redcap" usually referred to the drug Dalmane.

== See also ==
- Red beret
- Little Red Riding Hood (disambiguation)
