= Core outcome set =

A core outcome set (COS) is a standardized set of domains and instruments that define the minimum outcomes to be measured and reported in all clinical trials related to a specific clinical area. It is developed through a rigorous consensus process involving diverse collaborators, including patient research partners, healthcare professionals, and researchers. The process has two key phases:

1. Identifying what to measure (domains), which results in a core domain set.
2. Determining how to measure these domains through the selection of validated instruments.

By providing a common framework for measuring and reporting outcomes, a COS ensures consistency and comparability across studies, leading to more reliable and meaningful data in research on a particular health condition.

== Terminology ==
The term core domain is a key aspect of health or well-being that is considered essential to define, measure, and report in all clinical trials and other research studies related to a specific health condition or disease. These are considered the ‘What’ to measure in core outcome sets. The term core domain should not be confused with the term domain, which refers to any clinical endpoint that can be measured in research, regardless of importance.

Similarly, core domains are distinct from core instruments (also known as outcome measures). While core domains provide guidance on what to measure in clinical studies, core instruments guide how to measure those selected outcomes.

== Scope ==
Core outcome sets are commonly used by clinical investigators who conduct clinical trials for the treatment of a health condition. The patient population associated with a particular core outcome set may vary, as some apply to all patients with that health condition and others apply to a small subset of that population. Core outcome sets are typically used in research, but they may also be used for patient management during routine clinical care.

The need to develop core outcome sets was initially identified by methodologists and aggregators of systematic reviews, like Cochrane, who observed that meta-analyses of trials of similar conditions were frequently impeded by the lack of similarity among the outcomes and outcome measures they employed.

== Methodology ==
In general, the process for developing a core outcome set requires rigorous methodology in which domains are first generated from all possible sources and then subsequently prioritized during a consensus process.

A long list of domains is first developed by means of systematic reviews, literature reviews, and reviews of patient resources. Additional domains are identified by interviewing those with further personal, professional, or scientific knowledge of the health condition, such as patients, representatives of patient support groups, physicians and other clinicians, industry scientists, and healthcare regulators.

After a list of potential domains is identified, an international group of experts and patients then select the domains most important to them by a consensus process, commonly the Delphi technique or nominal group technique.

For each of the selected core domains, instruments are identified and then selected through an instrument selection process.

The selected list of core domains and instruments is then published and disseminated for use by clinical trialists. Uptake of the core outcome set, or its active use by trialists, is encouraged.

== Examples of core outcome set initiatives ==
The first initiative to standardize outcomes was led in 1970 by the World Health Organization (WHO), which attempted to create a set of domains for clinical trials in cancer. Since then, numerous initiatives have been created to both develop core outcome sets and provide resources for other groups.

=== Core Outcome Sets in rheumatology ===
==== OMERACT ====
Over 19 core domain sets related to rheumatology have been developed by The Outcome Measures in Rheumatology (OMERACT) collaboration, including those for fibromyalgia, gout, and osteoporosis. In addition to developing core outcome sets in rheumatology, OMERACT publishes resources and handbooks for researchers that can be applied across all specialties.

=== General initiatives ===
==== COMET ====
The Core Outcome Measures in Effectiveness Trials (COMET) group is an international collaboration that provides extensive methodological support to all groups developing core outcome sets. COMET was first launched in 2010 and is currently led by Paula Williamson.

=== Core outcomes in dermatology ===
==== CS-COUSIN ====
The Cochrane Skin - Core Outcome Set Initiative (CS-COUSIN) group was created with the aim of developing core outcome sets in dermatology and providing methodological support to core outcome set developers. CS-COUSIN is affiliated with the development of 18 dermatologic core outcome sets, including those for vitiligo, eczema, and acne.

==== IMPROVED ====
The Measurement of Priority Outcome Variables in Dermatologic Surgery group (IMPROVED), led by Murad Alam, is an international collaboration of dermatologic surgeons that has developed core outcomes for various dermatologic surgery conditions. Notably, the IMPROVED group has developed core outcome sets for cutaneous squamous cell carcinoma, basal cell carcinoma, and actinic keratosis.

=== Core outcome in women's health ===
==== CROWN ====
Six core outcome sets have been developed by the Core Outcomes in Women's and Newborns' Health (CROWN) collaboration for various health conditions relevant to women's health. Notable sets include those for diabetes in pregnancy, preterm birth, and maternity care.

== Access to core outcome sets ==
Core outcome sets that are published or are in development can be found in a database maintained by the COMET initiative. The database is refreshed annually by a systematic review of core outcome set studies.
