= Remote data capture =

Remote data capture is the process of automatic collection of scientific data. It is widely used in clinic trials, where it is referred to as electronic data capture. In physical sciences, automatic observation hardware in the field can be linked to an observer in a laboratory through a cellphone or other communication link, for example in hydrology. RDC systems influenced the design of later electronic data capture (EDC) systems.
