= Recurrent genital herpes quality of life measure =

The Recurrent Genital Herpes Quality of Life (RGHQoL) measure is a patient-reported outcome measure which determines the impact that recurrent genital herpes has on a patient’s quality of life. It is a 20 item questionnaire with items such as “Herpes makes it difficult for me to plan ahead” and “I worry that sex will trigger an outbreak.”. Lower scores on the RGHQoL indicate a higher negative impact on quality of life.

== Background ==
The RGHQoL was published in 1998 by Galen Research and was funded by Glaxo Wellcome Research & Development. The content of the measure was taken from qualitative interviews conducted with patients with recurrent genital herpes. The initial interviews were conducted in the UK and then an international panel was assembled in order to translate and validate the measure for the UK, USA, Italy, France, Germany and Denmark. Items were translated and then field tested with up to 20 RGH patients in each country. The test-retest correlations for each language version was found to be in excess of 0.85, meaning every version had good reliability.

== International use ==
The RGHQoL has been used in numerous clinical studies worldwide as a tool for assessing new treatments and measuring quality of life. It has been utilized in studies investigating suppressive antiviral therapy, famciclovir and quality of life.
