= Functional Assessment of Cancer Therapy - General =

Patient-reported outcome measure

Functional Assessment of Cancer Therapy - General (FACT-G) is a patient-reported outcome measure used to assess health-related quality of life in patients undergoing cancer therapy. The FACT-G is the original questionnaire that led to the development of the larger Functional Assessment of Chronic Illness Therapy (FACIT) collection of quality of life instruments. The survey assesses the impacts of cancer therapy in four domains: physical, social/family, emotional, and functional. The FACT-G is also offered with additional questions measuring cancer-specific factors that may affect quality of life, leading to the creation of the Functional Assessment of Cancer Therapy - Head and Neck (FACT-H&N), the Functional Assessment of Cancer Therapy - Lung (FACT-L), and 18 others.

== History and development ==
The Fact-G was developed by David Cella, now president and Chief Scientific Officer of FACIT.org and Chair of the Department of Medical Social Sciences at Northwestern University Feinberg School of Medicine. It was developed to assess the quality of life in cancer patients undergoing clinical trials for cancer therapy. Dr. Cella argues for the value of quality of life measures in general because "implicitly, the relief of a symptom is valued because of its associated benefit to patient function and well-being. Explicitly, it is essential to determine whether any supportive-care intervention is producing a benefit that outweighs its cost." Since development began in 1987, the initial 33-item Fact-G published in 1993 has undergone multiple revisions, with the latest version (Fact-G Version 4) "designed to enhance clarity and precision of measurement" through "formatting simplification, item-reduction, and rewording," resulting in the 27-item scale used today. In addition to revisions and refinement, the FACT-G has been translated into over 60 languages.

== Structure and scoring ==
The FACT-G Version 4 has 27 questions, each of which is answered using a 5-point Likert scale ranging from 0 (Not at all) to 4 (Very much). Questions are phrased so that higher numbers indicate a better health state, leading to some items being reverse-scored. Questions measure the respondents' health state over the last 7 days in four subscales: Physical Well-Being (PWB, 7 questions), Social/Family Well-Being (SWB, 7 questions), Emotional Well-Being (EWB, 6 questions), and Functional Well-being (FWB, 7 questions). Disease-specific versions of the FACT-G contain these four core subscales, with additional questions appended to address disease-specific factors.

Scoring the FACT-G is performed through a simple sum of item scores. Each subscale is scored, and a total score for the FACT-G is obtained by adding each of the subscale scores. With a total possible score greater than 100, additional scoring methods have been used to simplify interpretation. Modifications of scoring include normalizing the total score on a scale of 0-100 through mathematical transformations, as well as the use of a Trial Outcome Index (TOI). The Trial Outcome Index is a simple sum of the Physical Well-Being and Functional Well-Being, and is intended as a summary index of functional status to be used as a clinical trials endpoint.

== Current usage ==
The FACT-G is one of the most widely used patient-reported outcomes measures in cancer research along with the European Organisation for Research and Treatment of Cancer Quality of Life Questionnaire Core 30 (EORTC QLQ-C30), according to a 2011 systematic review comparing the two instruments. The authors suggest that researchers interested in the financial impact and physical symptoms of cancer treatment use the EORTC QLQ-C30, while those interested in health-related quality of life or with limited sample sizes use the FACT-G. The review ultimately concludes that "Numerous studies have provided strong support for convergent and discriminant validity of both the QLQ-C30 and FACT-G" and provides an aid to "...clinical researchers in deciding which of the two questionnaires is the most appropriate for their purposes, driven by the outcomes that are of most interest."

Professional organizations in the United States, United Kingdom, and Australia have embraced the FACT-G as a standard assessment of quality of life in cancer clinical trials. The American Society of Clinical Oncology requested that the Food and Drug Administration define the FACT-G as the gold standard assessment of health-related quality of life in a proposed amendment to the Food and Drug Administration's "Guidance for Industry on Clinical Trail Endpoints for the Approval of Cancer Drugs and Biologics" although, this amendment was not included in the May 2007 publication. The Patient-Reported Outcomes Measurement Group at the University of Oxford reported that the FACT-G is a promising patient-reported outcome measurement that is worth piloting in the National Health Service as a standard. Finally, The Cancer Institute NSW in Australia scored multiple quality of life instruments used in cancer care, and cited the FACT-G as "most appropriate in the cancer setting" when measuring health related quality of life in cancer patients.

== Related scales ==
The creation of the FACT-G ultimately led to the development of the FACIT family of questionnaires for use in specific circumstances and additional diseases. There are over 20 cancer-specific scales such as the FACT-B for breast cancer and FACT-C for colorectal cancer and 27 symptom indexes which are short, 6 or 7 item subscales which focus only on symptoms. 12 treatment-specific measures focus on the quality of life impacts that patients receiving enteral feeding or with neurotoxicity experience. Finally, 13 non-cancer specific measures focus on topics beyond the impacts of disease and treatment, such as COST, which assesses financial impacts while the Facit-Sp measures spiritual well-being.
