= The Rheumatoid Arthritis Quality of Life Questionnaire =

Disease-specific patient-reported outcome measure

- Purpose: determine quality of life with Rheumatoid Arthritis

The Rheumatoid Arthritis Quality of Life Questionnaire (RAQoL) is a disease-specific patient-reported outcome measure which determines the effect rheumatoid arthritis has on a patient's quality of life. The RAQoL has 30 items with a yes and no response format and takes about six minutes to complete.

Scores on the RAQoL are a sum of all the individual item scores with a range from 0-30, with a lower score indicating better quality of life. The RAQoL is a self-assessment questionnaire, meaning patients fill out the survey themselves in order to avoid experimental error.

== History ==
The RAQoL was developed by Galen Research, the University of Leeds and the Academic Hospital Maastricht, and was first published in 1997. It was the first patient completed quality of life questionnaire that focused on rheumatoid arthritis and is distinct from other questionnaires as it includes physical contact as a dimension of quality of life. Other dimensions include activities of daily living, social interaction/function, emotions, mood and recreation and pastimes.

== International Use ==
Since its development, the RAQOL has been translated into 33 languages other than Dutch and UK English. Validation studies have been performed in countries such as Sweden, Argentina and Australia in order to confirm the responsiveness and validity of the language adaptations.

The RAQoL has been used in clinical studies in order to confirm the efficacy of proposed treatments of rheumatoid arthritis. It has been utilized in order to confirm the efficacy of tocilizumab and infliximab.
