= Diabetes Health Profile =

Health evaluation measure

The Diabetes Health Profile (DHP) is a diabetes-specific patient reported outcome measure (PROM) developed to evaluate the health-related quality of life (HRQoL) of people living with Type 1 and Type 2 diabetes aged 16 years and older. It has been used in community surveys, research studies, clinical trials, and educational interventions both in Europe and completed globally by more than 10,000 patients. The DHP was the diabetes-specific PROM selected by the UK Department of Health for their Long Terms Conditions PROM Pilot Study being carried out by Oxford University.

== Diabetes Health Profile (DHP-1) ==
Based on a conceptual model the DHP-1 was developed for people with Type 1 diabetes to assess the impact of living with diabetes has on patients quality of life1. Developed using a multimethod methodology including, in-depth interviews with patients, clinical consensus and extensive psychometric validation, the DHP-1 comprises 32 items which are summed to provide three domain scores measuring: Psychological distress – (14-items) (dysphoric mood, feelings of hopelessness, irritability, self-harm, feeling of external hostility); Barriers to activity (13-items) (perceived limitation to activity, operant anxiety) and Disinhibited eating (5-items) (lack of eating control, response to food cues and emotional arousal). The observed Flesch Kincaid readability statistic is 5.8 for the DHP-1 and a Flesch reading ease is 74.7. Completion time is approximately 9–12 minutes. The DHP-1 has demonstrates highly satisfactory measurement properties including reliability coefficients > 0.80, construct, convergent and criterion validity and ability to discriminate between patients experiencing hypoglycaemic episodes.

== Diabetes Health Profile (DHP-18, DHP-3D & DHP-5D) ==
The DHP-18 was developed for people with Type 1 and Type 2 diabetes to measure the impact of living with diabetes on the patient's quality of life(5). It comprises 18 items which capture the three key domains based on a conceptual model and conceptual framework identified for the DHP-1. These are, Psychological distress – 6-items (dysphoric mood, feelings of hopelessness, irritability); Barriers to activity 7-items ( perceived limitation to activity, operant anxiety) and Disinhibited eating 5-items (lack of eating control, response to food cues and emotional arousal). The observed Flesch Kincaid readability statistic is 4.5 for the DHP-1 and a Flesch reading ease is 83.0. Completion time is approximately 5–6 minutes.

The DHP-18 has demonstrated very good measurement properties including reliability coefficient >0.70 and the ability to discriminate between different treatment and patient groups.

Both the DHP-3D and DHP-5D can be used to provide condition-specific utility values to complement generic utilities from more widely validated measures such as the EuroQol-5 Dimension.

== Scoring the DHP ==
Items are scored using a 4-point Likert-type scale ranging from 0-3. Domain raw scores are transformed to a common score range of 0-100, with 0 representing no dysfunction.

== Uses ==
- Evaluating health improvement and quality of life
- Monitoring population quality of life
- Evaluating health programmes and quality of life
- Evaluating treatment effectiveness and quality of life
- Enhancing doctor-patient communication
- Provide condition-specific utility values to complement generic utilities from more widely validated measures

== Language versions ==
The DHP has been officially adapted for use in 32 languages including:

Bulgarian, Canada (English), Canada (French), Croatian, Czech, Danish, Finnish, Flemish, French, French (Swiss), German, German (Austrian), German (Swiss), Hungarian, Italian, Italian (Swiss), Mandarin, Netherlands, Norwegian, Polish, Romanian, Slovak, Slovenian, Spanish, Swedish, US (English), US (Spanish), Turkish (for Germany), Waloon

== Licensing ==
Clinical Outcomes – an activity within Oxford University Innovation ltd, the technology transfer company of the University of Oxford, manage the licensing and marketing of the Diabetes Health Profile (DHP)
