= Migraine Specific Quality of Life =

Medical questionnaire

The Migraine Specific Quality of Life (MSQoL) is a patient-reported outcome measure (PRO or PROM) which assesses the quality of life of migraineurs. It is a 25-item questionnaire which is filled out by the patient and is used to determine how the patient's life has been affected by their migraines.

== History and development ==
The MSQoL was funded by the Wellcome Foundation and developed by Galen Research, as part of an international research study which was conducted in eight countries, with initial work conducted in the UK and US. In the UK, 30 patients who suffer from migraine were interviewed, while 25 patients were interviewed in the US. A focus group was also held with 5 participants. Transcripts of these interviews were used to determine the questionnaire items. The MSQoL was assessed for reliability and validity and was found to have good consistency and test-retest reliability. Scores on the MSQoL were also found to be consistent with another measure of well-being as well as the perceived severity of the affliction for the patients.

== International use ==
The MSQoL has been translated into several languages other than UK English: German, Dutch, Danish, Spanish, Finnish, French, Italian, and USA English.

The MSQoL has also been utilized by pharmaceutical companies in order to test whether a given therapy or medication is effective in treating migraines. The MSQoL has been used in the assessment of the effect of nadolol and topiramate, regular water intake and using migraine patients as trainers in preventive attack management. Different scores on the MSQoL taken before and after the trial infer a change in the patient's quality of life.
