= Ankylosing Spondylitis Quality of Life =

Patient-reported outcome questionnaire

The Ankylosing Spondylitis Quality of Life (ASQoL) questionnaire is a patient-reported outcome (PRO) measure which assesses the quality of life of patients with ankylosing spondylitis. The ASQoL is based on the needs-based quality of life model. It is a self-administered questionnaire which contains 18 items and takes up to four minutes to complete.

Developed by Galen Research and published in 2003, the ASQoL has been used in clinical studies worldwide. The content for the measure was drawn from qualitative interviews that were conducted with ankylosing spondylitis (AS) patients. The draft version of the ASQoL was created and then went through several stages of testing to ensure it had good face validity, content validity, reproducibility and construct validity.

== Language adaptations ==
The ASQoL was initially developed in UK English and Dutch, but to date a total of 37 language versions have been adapted. The language adaptations can be broken down into waves:

| Wave | Language adaptation |
|---|---|
| First Wave | US English, Canadian French, Canadian English, French, German, Italian, Spanish and Swedish |
| Second Wave | Argentinian Spanish, Belgian Flemish, Belgian French, US Spanish, Czech, Hungarian, Mexican Spanish, Turkish, Polish, New Zealand English and Brazilian Portuguese. |
| Third Wave | Bulgarian, Chilean Spanish, Greek, Croatian, Danish, Finnish, Swedish for Finland, Hebrew, Korean, Norwegian, Peruvian Spanish, Philippine Tagalog, Russian, Slovak, UAE Arabic, Traditional Chinese-Taiwan, Simplified Chinese-China. |

== Pharmaceutical use ==
Pharmaceutical companies began utilizing the ASQoL to test the effectiveness of newly developed TNF inhibitors, which aid in the treatment of ankylosing spondylitis. Abbott has utilized the ASQoL to evaluate the impact of adalimumab and other organizations like Wyeth and the Medical Research Council have used it to evaluate the effect of etanercept.

== Evaluation ==
Since the development of the ASQoL, several studies have been performed in order to evaluate and validate the measure. These studies include:

- Validation studies for different language versions of the ASQoL which found good reliability and validity.
