= Patient-Reported Outcomes Measurement Information System =

The Patient-Reported Outcomes Measurement Information System (PROMIS) provides clinicians and researchers access to reliable, valid, and flexible measures of health status that assess physical, mental, and social well–being from the patient perspective. PROMIS measures are standardized, allowing for assessment of many patient-reported outcome domains—including pain, fatigue, emotional distress, physical functioning and social role participation—based on common metrics that allow for comparisons across domains, across chronic diseases, and with the general population. Further, PROMIS tools allow for computer adaptive testing, efficiently achieving precise measurement of health status domains with few items. There are PROMIS measures for both adults and children. PROMIS was established in 2004 with funding from the National Institutes of Health (NIH) as one of the initiatives of the NIH Roadmap for Medical Research.

== Background and history ==
The NIH established the Roadmap for Medical Research in 2004 to identify major opportunities for medical research and the development of new scientific expertise and technology that would lead to tangible benefits for patients. One of the programs within the Roadmap, Re-engineering the Clinical Research Enterprise, called for developing rigorous and systematic infrastructure for clinical research and for translating scientific discoveries into practical applications or tools that can be used by healthcare providers. PROMIS is one initiative within this program. The PROMIS initiative develops and evaluates standard measures for key patient-reported health indicators and symptoms. Patient-reported measures such as pain, fatigue, emotional distress, and physical functioning complement clinical measures (e.g., x-rays and lab tests) by providing healthcare providers with information about what patients are able to do and how they feel.

PROMIS has worked to unify the field of patient-reported outcome (PRO) measurement through the promotion of a common, systematic measurement system broadly applicable across clinical research. PROMIS measures are intended to assess the most common or salient dimensions of patient–relevant outcomes for the widest possible range of chronic disorders and diseases, thus they are "generic" measures vs. specific to given disease or condition. Structured as a multi-institutional collaboration with NIH, PROMIS has advanced the consensus process within the field of PRO measurement through the involvement of the funded research collaborative in establishing a rigorous, systematic infrastructure for measure development and psychometric evaluation.

PROMIS takes advantage of developments in technology, as well as advances in the sciences of psychometric, qualitative, cognitive, and health survey research, to create new models and methods for collecting PROs for use in clinical research and evaluation of medical care. PROMIS incorporates and translates cutting-edge science into practical, easy to use tools for clinicians: For example, PROMIS implements Computer Adaptive Test (CAT) software which tailors the PRO assessment to the individual patient by selecting the most informative set of questions based on responses to previous questions. CAT questionnaires allow an accurate measurement of health status using the fewest possible questions.

== Assessment and expansion ==
In November 2012, the PROMIS network held it first international strategy meeting with organizational partners from 8 European countries, China and Canada to develop a strategic action plan for the international spread of PROMIS.

In early 2013, PROMIS unveiled new materials to expand its outreach to researchers and clinicians: the PROMIS e-newsletter and two instructional videos series about PROMIS and Item Response Theory.

In 2016, an updated PROMIS website at www.HealthMeasures.net was created to provide more information about measure selection, data collection tools, score calculation, score interpretation, item response theory, and support an online forum for posting questions to the PROMIS user community.

== Affiliates ==
The PROMIS initiative is fulfilled by a network of primary research sites and coordinating centers that collaborate to develop the items and tools to measure PROs, and to evaluate the reliability and validity of these measures. Between 2004 and 2009, PROMIS consisted of a Statistical Coordinating Center, located at Evanston Northwestern Healthcare, and six research sites located at Duke University, University of North Carolina at Chapel Hill, University of Pittsburgh, Stanford University, Stony Brook University, and University of Washington. In 2010, NIH renewed funding for PROMIS and expanded the program to six additional research sites: Children's Hospital of Philadelphia; Boston University / University of Michigan, Ann Arbor; University of California, Los Angeles; Georgetown University; Children's Hospital Medical Center, Cincinnati; and University of Maryland, Baltimore. PROMIS also added a Network Center, operated by the American Institutes for Research, Washington DC as well as a Statistical Center and a Technology Center, both operated by Northwestern University. These centers provided logistical and technical support to PROMIS.

In September 2014, the NIH extended its support to PROMIS through funding the National Person Centered Assessment Resource (PCAR/HealthMeasures). Three other measurement systems, Quality of Life in Neurologic Disorders (Neuro-QoL), Adult Sickle Cell Quality of Life Measurement system (ASCQ-Me), and the NIH Toolbox for the Assessment of Neurological and Behavioral Function (NIH Toolbox) are also supported through HealthMeasures. HealthMeasures aims to facilitate the dissemination, implementation, and self-sustainability of these four measurement systems. The HealthMeasures grant was awarded to Northwestern University with additional sites at American Institutes for Research, University of California, Los Angeles, University of California, San Diego, University of North Carolina, Chapel Hill, and University of Pittsburgh.

== Mission ==
PROMIS uses measurement science to create a state-of-the-science assessment system for self–reported health.

- Create and promulgate a set of qualitative and quantitative methodological standards for development and validation of PROMIS instruments.
- Launch a sustainable entity that is able to continue and grow the research, development, and dissemination activities for the network.
- Identify and prioritize a set of research and development opportunities for PROMIS that include, but are not limited to, clinical applications.
- Disseminate information on PROMIS to forge strategic alliances with key individuals and organizations that will help PROMIS fulfill its vision and enhance its adoption in research, clinical practice, and policy.

== Measures ==
PROMIS has self-reported health measures in the domains of physical health, mental health and social health for adult self-reported and pediatric-self and proxy-reported health.

Under each main domain (physical health, mental health, social health) are sub-domains associated with symptoms, function, affect, behavior, cognition, relationships or function. The sub-domains developed as of November 2016 are listed below. Domains that are “PROMIS Profile Domains” are included in either PROMIS Adult Profile Instruments (PROMIS-29, PROMIS-43, PROMIS-57) and Pediatric or Parent Proxy Profile Instruments (PROMIS Pediatric/Parent Proxy 25, PROMIS Pediatric/Parent Proxy 37, PROMIS Pediatric/Parent Proxy 49). There are also Sexual Function and Satisfaction Profiles for adults.

=== Adult self-reported health domains ===
Global Health (Mental, Physical)
Physical Health
Profile Domains:
- Physical Function
- Pain Intensity
- Pain Interference
- Fatigue
- Sleep Disturbance
Additional Domains:
- Dyspnea (Activity Motivation, Activity Requirements, Airborne Exposure, Assistive Devices, Characteristics, Emotional Response, Functional Limitations, Task Avoidance, Severity)
- Gastrointestinal Symptoms (Belly Pain, Bowel Incontinence, Constipation, Diarrhea, Disrupted Swallowing, Gas and Bloating, Gastroesophageal Reflux, Nausea and Vomiting)
- Pain Behavior
- Pain Quality (Neuropathic Pain, Nociceptive Pain)
- Sexual Function (Erectile Function, Global Satisfaction, Interest in Sexual Activity, Lubrication, Vaginal Discomfort, Anal Discomfort, Interfering Factors, Orgasm, Therapeutic Aids, Sexual Activities, Oral Discomfort, Oral Dryness, Bother Regarding Sexual Function, Vulvar Discomfort - Clitoral, - Labial)
- Sleep-related (daytime) Impairment
- Upper Extremity Function
Mental Health
Profile Domains:
- Depression
- Anxiety
Additional Domains:
- Alcohol Use, Consequences (Positive, Negative), & Expectancies (Positive, Negative)
- Anger
- Cognitive Function
- Psychosocial Illness Impact (Positive, Negative)
- Self-Efficacy (General, Manage Daily Activities, Manage Emotions, Manage Medications/Treatment, Manage Social Interactions, Manage Symptoms)
- Smoking (Coping Expectancies, Emotional/Sensory Expectancies, Health Expectancies, Psychosocial Expectancies, Nicotine Dependence, Social Motivations)
Social Health
Profile Domains:
- Ability to Participate in Social Roles and Activities
Additional Domains:
- Companionship
- Emotional Support
- Informational Support
- Instrumental Support
- Satisfaction with Participation in Discretionary Social Activities (v1.0)
- Satisfaction with Participation in Social Roles (v1.0)
- Satisfaction with Social Roles and Activities (v2.0)
- Social Isolation

=== Pediatric self- and proxy-reported health domains ===
Global Health
Physical Health
Profile Domains:
- Mobility
- Upper Extremity Function
- Pain Interference
- Pain Intensity
- Fatigue
Additional Domains:
- Asthma Impact
- Pain Behavior
- Physical Activity
- Physical Stress Experiences
- Strength Impact
Mental Health
Profile Domains:
- Depressive Symptoms
- Anxiety
Additional Domains:
- Anger
- Cognitive Function
- Life Satisfaction
- Meaning and Purpose
- Positive Affect
- Psychological Stress Experiences
Social Health
Profile Domains:
- Peer Relationships

== See also ==
- PhenX Toolkit
