= Linguistic validation =

Linguistic validation is the process of investigating the reliability, conceptual equivalence, and content validity of translations of patient-reported outcome (PRO) measurements.

== Methodology ==
Usually, linguistic validation is a process whereby translated text is tested with patients in a target population and target-language group via cognitive-debriefing interviews. For example, if a PRO instrument were intended to measure the symptoms of diabetes in a trial in Denmark, the linguistic-validation interviews would be conducted with diabetic patients in Denmark who speak Danish as their mother tongue.

This interview exercise ensures that items are appropriate for use in the target population, and are clearly expressed and understood. The exercise is also an important tool for demonstrating content validity when compared with the source. During the interview, the respondents complete the questionnaire, and then answer a series of open-ended questions on its content and explain in their own words what they think each item means. The results of this cognitive-debriefing exercise should therefore show the respondents' understanding of the translation, and alterations can be made after this stage if nuances of meaning in the source text have not been expressed clearly in the translation and understood by the respondents.

The process also ensures multi-lingual harmonization of the translations, by making sure that the questionnaire is understood the same way by target populations across all language groups, thus ensuring that the resulting quantitative data can be compared across language groups.

An alternative method of conducting linguistic validation is to ask a clinician who specialises in working with the target population to review the text, to ensure that it is clearly understandable. The clinician's understanding and knowledge of the usual terminology and phrases used by the patient group can be utilised, thus ensuring that the wording used in the translation reflects that which would be used by the target patient group themselves. Some parties feel that this step is sufficient to validate a PRO translation.

However, regulatory authorities consider it preferable to validate measures through the above-mentioned cognitive debriefing with the patients in the target population where possible, and clinician reviews are more usually reserved for clinician-reported measures, or for particular circumstances in which testing with patients in the target population is particularly problematic (Wild et al. 2005).

Some companies use the term "linguistic validation" to refer to the entire process of translating PRO measurements as described in the "Principles of Good Practice" (Wild et al. 2005), and in the International Society for Pharmacoeconomics and Outcomes Research (ISPOR) Task Force report (Wild et al. 2009), even if the process does not include patient interviews or a clinician review.

The recommended methodology utilizes double, independently created translations into the target language, which are then combined into a "reconciled version" which uses the best of both translations. The reconciled version, or harmonization, is then back-translated by two separate "blinded" translators who have no previous knowledge of the original questionnaire. The back-translations are used as a window into the translated version, so that the project manager can assess whether the translated version accurately assesses the concepts measured by the source questionnaire. This stage is described as the back-translation review. Ideally, it would be followed by patient interviews or a clinician review.

PROs should not be confused with PCOs (patient-centered outcomes). PCOs are the use of a questionnaire covering matters and concerns specific to a particular patient.

A comprehensive linguistic-validation process, including cognitive debriefing, is vital to demonstrate content validity in translations for use in a U.S. Food and Drug Administration (FDA) submission.

== See also ==
- Translation
