= Paula Williamson =

British medical statistician

Paula Williamson FMedSci
- Occupation: Statistician

Academic background
- Education: University of Sheffield
- Thesis: Prognostic prediction within Cox's proportional hazards regression model

Academic work
- Discipline: Medical statistics
- Sub-discipline: Clinical trials methodology
- Institutions: University of Liverpool

Paula Ruth Williamson FMedSci is a British medical statistician who specialises in medical statistics and the use of methodology within the field, particularly clinical trials methodology. A graduate from the University of Sheffield, she originally worked as a senior statistician in healthcare before moving to the University of Liverpool, where she became Professor of Medical Statistics and served as head of the Department of Biostatistics from 2002 until 2018. She was elected Fellow of the Academy of Medical Sciences in 2018.

== Biography ==
Paula Ruth Williamson was educated at the University of Sheffield, where she got her Bachelor of Science degree with special honours in Probability and Statistics and eventually her Doctor of Philosophy in Probability and Statistics. Her doctoral dissertation was titled Prognostic prediction within Cox's proportional hazards regression model.

She worked abroad as a senior research assistant at the National Centre in HIV Epidemiology and Clinical Research in Australia from 1990 until 1991, and having worked as a statistical tutor while studying for her PhD in Sheffield, later continued her tutor work abroad at the University of Sydney's Department of Mathematical Statistics in 1990. She worked as a senior statistician at the Yorkshire Clinical Trials and Research Unit (1992-1994) and the Central Manchester Healthcare Trust Department of Medical Genetics (1994-1996). She also worked as a geographer, during which she had some experience in statistics; she recalled this during a November 1999 meeting organised by the Royal Statistical Society's Merseyside Local Group.

In 1996, Williamson moved to the University of Liverpool Department of Mathematical Sciences and started as a lecturer, before being promoted to senior lecturer in 2000 and reader at the Centre for Medical Statistics and Health Evaluation in 2002. In 2005, she was promoted to professor at the Department of Biostatistics, where she served as head from 2002 to 2018. She later moved to the University's Institute of Population Health and became Professor of Medical Statistics. She has also held several positions in government institutions, including chair of the Medical Research Council's Network of Hubs for Trials Methodology Research (2008-2018) and National Institute for Health and Care Research Senior Investigator. In 2021, she was elected to the Council of the Academy of Medical Sciences.

As an academic, Williamson specialises in medical statistics and the use of methodology within the field, particularly clinical trials methodology. In 2017, she was the speaker for the 26th Bradford Hill Memorial Lecture, "Improving health by improving trials: from outcomes to recruitment and back again". She was elected Fellow of the Academy of Medical Sciences in 2018.
