= Mobile forms =

A mobile form is an electronic or digital form application that functions on a smartphone or tablet device. Mobile forms enable users to collect data using mobile devices, and then to send the results back to the source. Mobile forms exist to replace paper forms as a more productive means of data collection, eliminating the need to transcribe or scan paper data results into a back office system.

Depending on the mobile form application provider, some mobile form solutions allow offices to dispatch data to mobile form applications. In addition, other mobile form applications can be connected with various cloud services, servers, and social media platforms.

Depending on the business, the motivating factors to deploying mobile forms may vary. Some businesses implement mobile forms to speed up processes, while others institute mobile forms with field users to reduce costs associated with transporting paper forms back and forth. Furthermore, green-minded businesses implement mobile forms in order to be more environmentally friendly, thus reducing their reliance on paper, ink printing, and subsequent waste.

Advanced mobile form features include signature capture, bar code capture, photo capture, GPS location form info, time form info, and skip logic.

== Location-based Mobile Forms ==
Location-based mobile forms are applications that associate a specific GPS location to the form data. Theses types of application fall into the category of data collection systems and are used by field personnel to collect data at precise locations in the field. Data collected with these applications is georeferenced and is can be transferred to geographic information systems for further data analysis. Location-based mobile forms act as a bridge between field personnel and geomatics specialists.

Uses for mobile forms include:

- Safety inspections
- Work orders
- Expense reports
- Inventory reports
- Merchandise requisition
- Invoicing
- Environmental surveying
