= Nottingham Health Profile =

The Nottingham Health Profile (NHP) is a general patient reported outcome measure which seeks to measure subjective health status.

It is a questionnaire designed to measure a patient’s view of their own health status, in a number of areas. It can be completed in 5 minutes.

The NHP consists of two parts. The first part focuses on health and comprises 38 items which deal with pain, energy, sleep, mobility, emotional reaction and social isolation. The second part focuses on life areas affected and consists of 7 items which deal with problems regarding occupation, housework, social life, family life, sexual function, hobbies and holidays. The second part of the NHP is optional and can be omitted without ruining the test results.

All questions have only yes/no answer options and each section score is weighted. The higher the score, the greater the number and severity of problems. The highest score in any section is 100.

== Development ==
Work on the NHP began in 1975 at the Department of Community Health at the University of Nottingham. The principle researchers involved in the project were Sonja M. Hunt, J. McEwen and S.P. McKenna. 2200 statements describing the effects of poor health were collected from over 700 patients, which covered social, psychological, physical and behavioural sectors. Key concepts were identified from these statements, and many were removed due to redundancy.

138 statements remained, and a series of studies were conducted between 1976 and 1978 in order to refine the number of statements to a further extent. The studies were conducted on a wide range of patients in order to ensure the general efficacy of the NHP.

In 1978, a grant was received from the Social Science Research Council in order to further develop the NHP into a population survey tool. This meant making the profile easier to read, quick and simple to answer and commonly understood. After further testing, statements that fit these criteria were retained and this resulted in the 45 item questionnaire.

Current copyright of the NHP is owned by Galen Research.

== International Use ==
Since its development, the NHP has been used by a number of organisations worldwide.

The NHP has been translated into 24 languages other than UK English which include Spanish, Danish, French and German.

It has been used in research studies worldwide in order to determine the effect a given disease has on a patient’s quality of life. Examples of such studies are investigations into the effect of insomnia on brain tumour patients, fatigue in post-polio patients and the sleep, fragility and cognition of the elderly.

The profile has also been utilized in clinical research studies in order to determine whether a treatment is effective. If a patient’s score on the questionnaire is significantly different after the treatment, this indicates that the treatment has had an effect. Clinical research studies where the NHP was utilized include investigations into erythropoiesis-stimulating agents, glucocorticoid replacement therapy and transcutaneous electrical nerve stimulation for tinnitus.
