= Psoriasis index of quality of life =

Patient-reported outcome measure

The Psoriasis Index of Quality of Life (PSORIQoL) is a patient-reported outcome measure which determines the quality of life of patients with psoriasis. It is based on a needs-based approach to quality of life.

== Background ==
The Psoriasis Index of Quality of Life (PSORIQOL) was published in 2003 by Galen Research. The development of the PSORIQOL was a joint effort between the University of Verona, Erasmus University Rotterdam and the University of Sheffield. The content of the PSORIQOL was derived from 62 qualitative interviews with psoriasis patients. The interview transcripts from the three countries were then analyzed for items for the questionnaire. The rest of the development of the PSORIQoL took place in the United Kingdom. Face and content validity of the selected items were determined by a focus group and further interviews. The PSORIQoL was then completed by two new samples of psoriasis patients by mail, in order to confirm validity and reliability. The result was a 25 item questionnaire.

== International use ==
The PSORIQOL has been recognized by the National Institute for Health and Care Excellence as a suitable tool for assessing the impact of psoriasis on the patient. It has also been used in clinical studies investigating new treatments.
