= Tufts Center for the Study of Drug Development =

Academic research institution

- Formation: 1976
- Founder: Louis Lasagna
- Type: Independent, Academic, Non-Profit Research Center
- Purpose: Researching drug development
- Location: Boston, Massachusetts
- Director: Kenneth Getz
- Website: csdd.tufts.edu

The Tufts Center for the Study of Drug Development is an independent, academic, non-profit research center at Tufts University in Boston, dedicated to researching drug development. It was established in 1976 by American physician Louis Lasagna. The Center develops and publishes information to help researchers, regulators, and policy makers in areas related to the pharmaceutical and biotechnology industries. In any given year, approximately 55% of Tufts CSDD's operating expenses are supported by grants from the private sector and 45% from the public sector.

== Research ==
The Center studies trends in the pharmaceutical industry, maintaining databases pertaining to investigational new drugs, approved drugs, biopharmaceuticals, fast-tracked drugs, and orphan drugs. The Center provides this information with the aim to improve the efficiency of drug development, foster innovation, and increase patient access to medicines.

=== Drug development costs ===
The center has published numerous studies estimating the cost of developing new pharmaceutical drugs. In 2001, researchers from the Center estimated that the cost of doing so was $802 million, and in 2014, they released a study estimating that this amount had risen to nearly $2.6 billion. The 2014 study was criticized by Medecins Sans Frontieres, which said it was unreliable because the industry's research and development spending is not made public. Aaron Carroll of the New York Times also criticized the study, saying it "contains a lot of assumptions that tend to favor the pharmaceutical industry." The center's 2016 estimate, published in the Journal of Health Economics, found the cost to have averaged $2.87 billion (in 2013 dollars).
