= Clinical data acquisition =

Acquisition or collection of clinical trial data can be achieved through various methods that may include, but are not limited to, any of the following: paper or electronic medical records, paper forms completed at a site, interactive voice response systems, local electronic data capture systems, or central web based systems.

== Guidelines ==
There is arguably no more important document than the instrument that is used to acquire the data from the clinical trial with the exception of the protocol, which specifies the conduct of that clinical trial. The quality of the data collected relies first and foremost on the quality of that instrument. No matter how much time and effort go into conducting the clinical trial, if the correct data points were not collected, a meaningful analysis may not be possible. It follows, therefore, that the design, development and quality assurance of such an instrument must be given the utmost attention.

The ICH guidelines on good clinical practice (GCP) use the term ‘case report form’ (CRF) to refer to these systems. No matter what CRF is utilized, the quality and integrity of the data is of primary importance.

== See also ==
- Case report form
- Clinical Data Interchange Standards Consortium (CDISC)
- Clinical data management system (CDMS)
- Clinical Document Architecture (CDA)
- Data management
- Directive 95/46/EC on the protection of personal data
- Electronic data capture
- Health Insurance Portability and Accountability Act (HIPAA)
- Health Level 7
- Patient-reported outcome
- SmartPen – technological system for digitally encoding and transmitting Case Report Forms
- SNOMED
- Title 21 CFR Part 11
