= Drug development =

Process of bringing a new pharmaceutical drug to the market

Drug development is the process of bringing a new pharmaceutical drug to the market once a lead compound has been identified through the process of drug discovery. It includes preclinical research on microorganisms and animals, filing for regulatory status, such as via the United States Food and Drug Administration for an investigational new drug to initiate clinical trials on humans, and may include the step of obtaining regulatory approval with a new drug application to market the drug. The entire process—from concept through preclinical testing in the laboratory to clinical trial development, including Phase I–III trials—to approved vaccine or drug typically takes more than a decade.

== New chemical entity development ==
Broadly, the process of drug development can be divided into preclinical and clinical work.

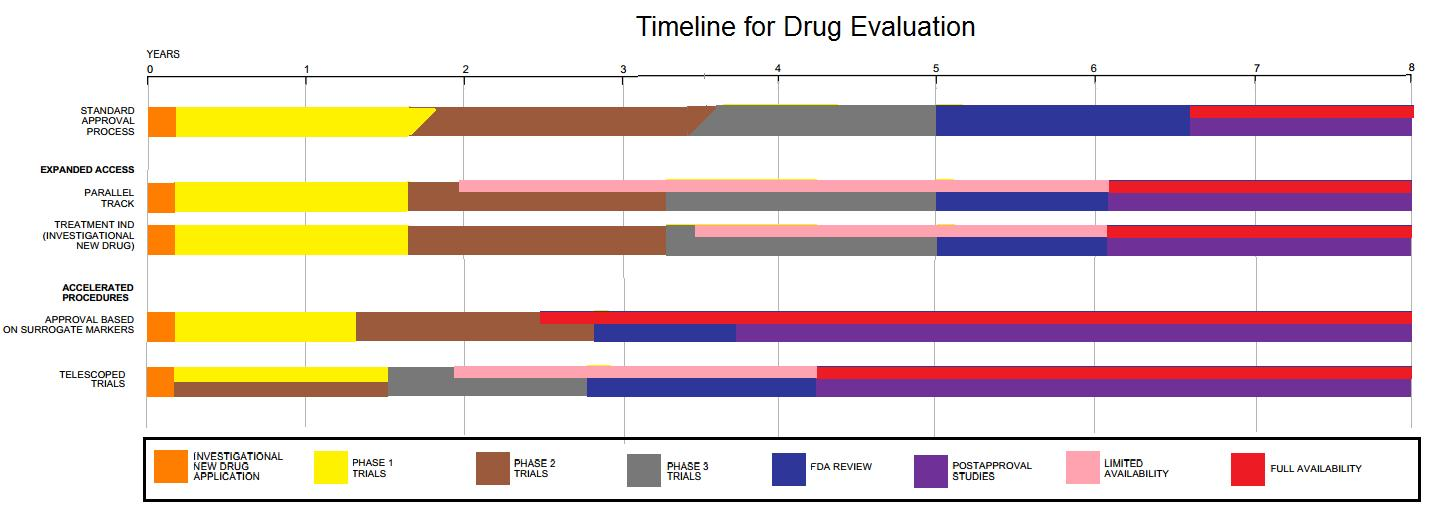
Timeline showing the various drug approval tracks and research phases

=== Pre-clinical ===
New chemical entities (NCEs, also known as new molecular entities or NMEs) are compounds that emerge from the process of drug discovery. These have promising activity against a particular biological target that is important in disease. However, little is known about the safety, toxicity, pharmacokinetics, and metabolism of this NCE in humans. It is the function of drug development to assess all of these parameters prior to human clinical trials. A further major objective of drug development is to recommend the dose and schedule for the first use in a human clinical trial ("first-in-human" [FIH] or First Human Dose [FHD], previously also known as "first-in-man" [FIM]).

In addition, drug development must establish the physicochemical properties of the NCE: its chemical makeup, stability, and solubility. Manufacturers must optimize the process they use to make the chemical so they can scale up from a medicinal chemist producing milligrams, to manufacturing on the kilogram and ton scale. They further examine the product for suitability to package as capsules, tablets, aerosol, intramuscular injectable, subcutaneous injectable, or intravenous formulations. Together, these processes are known in preclinical and clinical development as chemistry, manufacturing, and control (CMC).

Many aspects of drug development focus on satisfying the regulatory requirements for a new drug application. These generally constitute a number of tests designed to determine the major toxicities of a novel compound prior to first use in humans. It is a legal requirement that an assessment of major organ toxicity be performed (effects on the heart and lungs, brain, kidney, liver and digestive system), as well as effects on other parts of the body that might be affected by the drug (e.g., the skin if the new drug is to be delivered on or through the skin). Such preliminary tests are made using in vitro methods (e.g., with isolated cells), but many tests can only use experimental animals to demonstrate the complex interplay of metabolism and drug exposure on toxicity.

However, aside from regulatory requirements, there is a broad range of other factors, such as patient requirements, that are considered during development and testing.

The information gathered from this preclinical testing, as well as information on CMC, and submitted to regulatory authorities (in the US, to the FDA), as an Investigational New Drug (IND) application. If the IND is approved, development moves to the clinical phase.

=== Clinical phase ===
Clinical trials involve four steps:

- Phase I trials, usually in healthy volunteers, determine safety and dosing.
- Phase II trials are used to get an initial reading of efficacy and further explore safety in small numbers of patients having the disease targeted by the NCE.
- Phase III trials are large, pivotal trials to determine safety and efficacy in sufficiently large numbers of patients with the targeted disease. If safety and efficacy are adequately proved, clinical testing may stop at this step and the NCE advances to the new drug application (NDA) stage.
- Phase IV trials are post-approval trials that are sometimes a condition attached by the FDA, also called post-market surveillance studies.

The process of defining characteristics of the drug does not stop once an NCE is advanced into human clinical trials. In addition to the tests required to move a novel vaccine or antiviral drug into the clinic for the first time, manufacturers must ensure that any long-term or chronic toxicities are well-defined, including effects on systems not previously monitored (fertility, reproduction, immune system, among others).

If a vaccine candidate or antiviral compound emerges from these tests with an acceptable toxicity and safety profile, and the manufacturer can further show it has the desired effect in clinical trials, then the NCE portfolio of evidence can be submitted for marketing approval in the various countries where the manufacturer plans to sell it. In the United States, this process is called a "new drug application" or NDA.

Most novel drug candidates (NCEs) fail during drug development, either because they have unacceptable toxicity or because they simply do not prove efficacy on the targeted disease, as shown in Phase II–III clinical trials. Critical reviews of drug development programs indicate that Phase II–III clinical trials fail due mainly to unknown toxic side effects (50% failure of Phase II cardiology trials), and because of inadequate financing, trial design weaknesses, or poor trial execution.

A study covering clinical research in the 1980–1990s found that only 21.5% of drug candidates that started Phase I trials were eventually approved for marketing. During 2006–2015, the success rate of obtaining approval from Phase I to successful Phase III trials was under 10% on average, and 16% specifically for vaccines. The high failure rates associated with pharmaceutical development are referred to as an "attrition rate", requiring decisions during the early stages of drug development to "kill" projects early to avoid costly failures.

== Cost ==
There are a number of studies that have been conducted to determine research and development costs: notably, recent studies from DiMasi and Wouters suggest pre-approval capitalized cost estimates of $2.6 billion and $1.1 billion, respectively. The figures differ significantly based on methodologies, sampling and timeframe examined. Several other studies looking into specific therapeutic areas or disease types suggest as low as $291 million for orphan drugs, $648 million for cancer drugs or as high as $1.8 billion for cell and gene therapies.

The average cost (2013 dollars) of each stage of clinical research was US$25 million for a Phase I safety study, $59 million for a Phase II randomized controlled efficacy study, and $255 million for a pivotal Phase III trial to demonstrate its equivalence or superiority to an existing approved drug, possibly as high as $345 million. The average cost of conducting a 2015–16 pivotal Phase III trial on an infectious disease drug candidate was $22 million.

The full cost of bringing a new drug (i.e., new chemical entity) to market—from discovery through clinical trials to approval—is complex and controversial. In a 2016 review of 106 drug candidates assessed through clinical trials, the total capital expenditure for a manufacturer having a drug approved through successful Phase III trials was $2.6 billion (in 2013 dollars), an amount increasing at an annual rate of 8.5%. Over 2003–2013 for companies that approved 8–13 drugs, the cost per drug could rise to as high as $5.5 billion, due mainly to international geographic expansion for marketing and ongoing costs for Phase IV trials for continuous safety surveillance.

Alternatives to conventional drug development have the objective for universities, governments, and the pharmaceutical industry to collaborate and optimize resources. An example of a collaborative drug development initiative is COVID Moonshot, an international open-science project started in March 2020 with the goal of developing an un-patented oral antiviral drug to treat SARS-CoV-2.

== Valuation ==
The nature of a drug development project is characterised by high attrition rates, large capital expenditures, and long timelines. This makes the valuation of such projects and companies a challenging task. Not all valuation methods can cope with these particularities. The most commonly used valuation methods are risk-adjusted net present value (rNPV), decision trees, real options, or comparables.

The most important value drivers are the cost of capital or discount rate that is used, phase attributes such as duration, success rates, and costs, and the forecasted sales, including cost of goods and marketing and sales expenses. Less objective aspects like quality of the management or novelty of the technology should be reflected in the cash flows estimation.

== Success rate ==
Candidates for a new drug to treat a disease might, theoretically, include from 5,000 to 10,000 chemical compounds. On average about 250 of these show sufficient promise for further evaluation using laboratory tests, mice and other test animals. Typically, about ten of these qualify for tests on humans. A study conducted by the Tufts Center for the Study of Drug Development covering the 1980s and 1990s found that only 21.5 percent of drugs that started Phase I trials were eventually approved for marketing. In the time period of 2006 to 2015, the success rate was 9.6%. The high failure rates associated with pharmaceutical development are referred to as the "attrition rate" problem. Careful decision making during drug development is essential to avoid costly failures. In many cases, intelligent programme and clinical trial design can prevent false negative results. Well-designed, dose-finding studies and comparisons against both a placebo and a gold-standard treatment arm play a major role in achieving reliable data.

== Computing initiatives ==
Novel initiatives include partnering between governmental organizations and industry, such as the European Innovative Medicines Initiative. The US Food and Drug Administration created the "Critical Path Initiative" to enhance innovation of drug development, and the Breakthrough Therapy designation to expedite development and regulatory review of candidate drugs for which preliminary clinical evidence shows the drug candidate may substantially improve therapy for a serious disorder.

In March 2020, the United States Department of Energy, National Science Foundation, NASA, industry, and nine universities pooled resources to access supercomputers from IBM, combined with cloud computing resources from Hewlett Packard Enterprise, Amazon, Microsoft, and Google, for drug discovery. The COVID-19 High Performance Computing Consortium also aims to forecast disease spread, model possible vaccines, and screen thousands of chemical compounds to design a COVID-19 vaccine or therapy. In May 2020, the OpenPandemics – COVID-19 partnership between Scripps Research and IBM's World Community Grid was launched. The partnership is a distributed computing project that "will automatically run a simulated experiment in the background [of connected home PCs] which will help predict the effectiveness of a particular chemical compound as a possible treatment for COVID-19".

== See also ==
- Drug design
- Drug repositioning
- Pharmaceutical engineering
- Pharmaceutical manufacturing
- Generic drug
- International Conference on Harmonisation of Technical Requirements for Registration of Pharmaceuticals for Human Use, a consensus between the U.S. Food and Drug Administration (FDA), EU, and Japan.
- Lists of investigational drugs
- List of pharmaceutical companies
