= Patient-reported outcome =

Outcome type in clinical trials

A patient-reported outcome (PRO) is a health outcome directly reported by the patient who experienced it. It stands in contrast to an outcome reported by someone else, such as a physician-reported outcome, a nurse-reported outcome, and so on. PRO methods, such as questionnaires, are used in clinical trials or other clinical settings, to help better understand a treatment's efficacy or effectiveness. The use of digitized PROs, or electronic patient-reported outcomes (ePROs), is on the rise in today's health research setting.

== Terminology ==
PROs should not be confused with PCOs, or patient-centered outcomes. The latter implies the use of a questionnaire covering issues and concerns that are specific to a patient. Instead, patient-reported outcomes refers to reporting situations in which only the patient provides information related to a specific treatment or condition; this information may or may not be of concern to the patient.

Further, PROs should not be confused with PREMs (patient reported experience measures), which focus more on a patient's overall experience versus a focus on specific treatment outcomes. The term PROs is becoming increasingly synonymous with "patient reported outcome measures" (PROMs).

== Overview ==
PRO is an umbrella term that covers a whole range of potential measurements, but it specifically refers to "self-reporting" by the patient. PRO data may be collected via self-administered questionnaires, which the patient completes themselves, or through patient interviews. The latter will only qualify as a PRO, however, if the interviewer is gaining the patient's views and not using the responses to make a professional assessment or judgment of the impact of a treatment on the patient's condition. Thus, PROs are used as a means of gathering patient- rather than clinical- or other outcomes perspectives. The patient-reported perspective can be an important asset in gaining treatment or drug approval.

There is no incentive for patients to report their outcome data other than to "pay it forward" to the community and help the health industry prevent unnecessary suffering in other patients.

== Characteristics ==
A well-designed PRO questionnaire should assess either a single underlying characteristic or, where it addresses multiple characteristics, should be a number of scales that each address a single characteristic. These measurement "characteristics" are termed constructs and the questionnaires used to collect them, termed instruments, measures, scales or tools. Typically, PRO tools must undergo extensive validation and testing.

A questionnaire that measures a single construct is described as unidimensional. Items (questions) in a unidimensional questionnaire can be added to provide a single scale score. However, it cannot be assumed that a questionnaire is unidimensional simply because the author intended it to be. This must be demonstrated empirically (for example, by confirmatory factor analysis or Rasch analysis). A questionnaire that measures multiple constructs is termed multi-dimensional. A multi-dimensional questionnaire is used to provide a profile of scores; that is, each scale is scored and reported separately. It is possible to create an overall (single summary) score from a multi-dimensional measure using factor analysis or preference-based methods but some may see this as akin to adding apples and oranges together.

Questionnaires may be generic (designed to be used in any disease population and cover a broad aspect of the construct measured) or condition-targeted (developed specifically to measure those aspects of outcome that are of importance for a people with a particular medical condition).

The most commonly used PRO questionnaires assess one of the following constructs:

- Symptoms (impairments) and other aspects of well-being
- Functioning (disability)
- Health status
- General health perceptions
- Quality of life (QoL)
- Health related quality of life (HRQoL)
- Reports and Ratings of health care.

Measures of symptoms may focus on a range of impairments or on a specific impairment such as depression or pain. Measures of functioning assess activities such as personal care, activities of daily living and locomotor activities. Health-related quality of life instruments are generally multi-dimensional questionnaires assessing a combination of aspects of impairments and/or disability and reflect a patient's health status. In contrast, QoL goes beyond impairment and disability by asking about the patient's ability to fulfill their needs and also about their emotional response to their restrictions.

A new generation of short and easy-to-use tools to monitor patient outcomes on a regular basis has been recently proposed. These tools are quick, effective, and easy to understand, as they allow patients to evaluate their health status and experience in a semi-structured way and accordingly aggregate input data, while automatically tracking their physio-emotional sensitivity. As part of the National Institute of Health's Roadmap Initiative, the Patient-Reported Outcomes Measurement Information System (PROMIS) uses modern advances in psychometrics such as item response theory (IRT) and computerized adaptive testing (CAT) to create highly reliable and validated measurement tools. The literature suggests increasing consistency in recommendations to guide PROM selection for clinical trials.

== Validation and quality assessment ==
It is essential that a PRO instrument satisfy certain development, psychometric and scaling standards if it is to provide useful information (e.g.). Specifically, measures should have a sound theoretical basis and should be relevant to the patient group with which they are to be used. They should also be reliable and valid (including responsive to underlying change) and the structure of the scale (whether it possesses a single or multiple domains) should have been thoroughly tested using appropriate methodology in order to justify the use of scale or summary scores. The validation of the PRO measures should incorporate not only short-term but also long-term success in order to be able to reflect sustainability of interventions. Classic examples of such tools and methods are noted in commonly used oncology tools, such as FACT or EORTC tools.

These standards must be maintained throughout every target language population. In order to ensure that developmental standards are consistent in translated versions of a PRO instrument, the translated instrument undergoes a process known as Linguistic validation in which the preliminary translation is adapted to reflect cultural and linguistic differences between diverse target populations.

== Preference-based ==
Preference-based PROs can be used for the computation of a quality-adjusted life year. A preference based PRO has an algorithm attached to the PRO instrument which can 'weigh' the outcomes reported by patients according to the preferences for health outcomes of a group of individuals such as the general public or of patient groups. The purpose of this 'weighing' is to make sure that elements of health that are very important receive larger weight when computing sum scores. For example, individuals may consider problems with their mood to be more important than limitations in usual activities. Examples of generic preference-based PROs are the Health Utilities Index and the EQ-5D. Condition-targeted preference-based PROs also exist, but there are some questions regarding their comparability to generic PROs when used for the computation of Quality Adjusted Life Years.

== Examples ==
Many of the common generic PRO tools assess health-related quality of life or patient evaluations of health care. For example, the SF-36 Health Survey, SF-12 Health Survey, Profile, the Nottingham Health Profile, the Health Utilities Index, the Quality of Well-Being Scale, the EuroQol (EQ-5D), and the Consumer Assessment of Healthcare Providers and Systems (CAHPS) survey instruments are PRO instruments.

Condition-targeted tools may capture any of the constructs listed above, depending on the purpose for which they were designed. Examples include the Adult Asthma Quality of Life Questionnaire (AQLQ), the Kidney Disease Quality of Life Instrument, National Eye Institute Visual Functioning Questionnaire, Epilepsy Surgery Inventory, Migraine Specific Quality of Life (MSQOL), the Ankylosing Spondylitis Quality of Life questionnaire (ASQoL) and the Seattle Angina Questionnaire (SAQ), to name a few.

=== PROMS in the AJRR ===
The American Joint Replacement Registry (AJRR) launched their Level III patient-reported outcome (PRO) platform in November 2015 and switched to a new version created and hosted by Ortech Systems in 2016. AJRR imports the PRO data into the AJRR's Demand Reporting & Electronic Dashboard system. Clinical staff is able to access patient data while having the ability to manage PRO surveys electronically via a secure patient portal. The AJRR Dashboard system can also pull site-specific patient reports and summary results for each PRO measure supported on the AJRR system.

AJRR collaborated with several orthopaedic organizations to identify the specific measures that AJRR should recommend and that may be used as national benchmarks. Even though specific measures are recommended, AJRR understands that some institutions may have in place a long-standing PRO data collection process. Participating hospitals are able to submit and retrieve these alternative measures, but there will not be national benchmarks available for them.

=== PROMs in the NHS ===
Since 1 April 2009 all providers of care funded by the National Health Service (NHS) in England have been required to provide patient-reported outcome measures (PROMs) in four elective surgical procedures: hip replacement, knee replacement, varicose vein surgery and hernia surgery. Patients are asked to complete a questionnaire before undergoing the surgical procedure; a follow-up questionnaire is then sent to the patient some weeks or months later. Patient participation is, however, not compulsory.

In December 2013 a team from the London School of Hygiene and Tropical Medicine reviewed the first three years of NHS PROMs data which captured responses from more than 50,000 patients who underwent groin hernia repair, varicose vein surgery or hip or knee replacements. They found "no grounds to suggest we should start cutting the amount of surgery we are doing".

=== In drug licensing and label claims ===
Patient-reported outcomes are important in a regulatory context. The US Food and Drug Administration (FDA) has issued formal Guidance to Industry on PROs in label claims and the European Medicines Agency (EMA) has produced a reflection paper on HRQoL. Increasing numbers of regulatory submissions for new drugs provide PRO data to support claims. DeMuro et al. (2013) have reviewed drug approvals for the years 2006–2010. They showed that of 75 drugs approved by both agencies, 35 (47%) had at last one PRO-related claim approved by the EMA compared to 14 (19%) for the FDA. The FDA was more likely to approve claims for symptom reduction, while the EMA approved relatively more claims for improvement in functioning or HrQoL.

=== PROMs in Multimodal Pain Therapy ===
Operationalizing success in multi-modal pain therapy is a challenge and is up to now characterized by tremendous heterogeneity. There are efforts to define core sets of patient-relevant outcome variables to be measured in clinical trials in general and for multi-modal pain therapy. Meanwhile, a core outcome measure set based on PROMS was developed with routine data and validated for operationalizing success in multimodal pain therapy. Validation studies suggest also suitability for depicting long-term success in the sense of sustainability of treatment effects.

=== PROMs in Epilepsy in Rural Maharashtra, India ===
Epilepsy accounts for a significant proportion of the world's disease burden, affecting 1% of the population by age 20 and 3% of the population by age 75. The prevalence of epilepsy in Maharashtra is estimated to be 1 million people. Epilepsy Foundation of India has been providing free diagnosis and treatment to people living with epilepsy across rural Maharashtra since 2011. Since 2018, they have been using MedEngage services to collect PROs from thousands of patients across the state. Patients use a zero-cost helpline to report outcomes every 2–3 months related to adherence, medicine availability, seizure frequency, healthcare related quality of life, and a few other parameters. All PROMs are analyzed to help guide public policy and optimize resource allocation for people living with epilepsy in Maharashtra.

=== PROMs in physiotherapy practice, India ===
Patient‑reported outcome measures (PROMs) are increasingly being used in the field of physiotherapy in India and they are primarily used to determine clinical improvement in patients following an intervention. The lack of instruments in non‑English speaking nations is a significant challenge. Moreover, professionals' understanding of the construct, development, and psychometric validation of PROMs are uncertain. A Cross Cultural Adaptation requires a translation process based on criteria, as well as an assessment of psychometric features in the target language. The real challenges include cultural adaptation of the items rather than a word‑for‑word translation

== Relationship to other data ==
The term Patient Reported Health Data was also introduced in 2018 to include patient reported data that are not outcomes (e.g., patient reported comorbidities, medications, hospitalizations).

== See also ==
- Case report form
- Clinical data acquisition
- Clinical research associate (CRA)
- Clinical trial protocol
- Data clarification form
- Drug development
- Electronic data capture
- Linguistic validation
- Patient diary
- Quality of Life in Depression Scale
