= Outline of clinical research =

Medical research using human test subjects

The following outline is provided as an overview of and topical guide to clinical research:

Clinical research is the aspect of biomedical research that addresses the assessment of new pharmaceutical and biological drugs, medical devices and vaccines in humans.

== General topics ==
- Clinical significance – a conclusion that an intervention has an effect that is of practical meaning to patients
- Drug discovery – the identification of candidates, synthesis, characterization, screening, and assays for therapeutic efficacy
- Drug development – the process of taking a new chemical through the stages necessary to allow testing in clinical trials
- Biotechnology – the technological application that uses biological systems, living organisms to make or modify products or processes for specific use
  - Biopharmaceutical – a drug produced using biotechnology
- Clinical trial – an experiment with human subjects to assess safety and efficacy of drugs
  - Academic clinical trials – clinical trials run at academic centers (e.g., medical schools, academic hospitals, and universities)
  - Clinical trials unit – biomedical research units dedicated to conducting clinical trials
- Epidemiology – the study of factors affecting the health and illness of populations
  - Epidemiological methods – statistical techniques used in epidemiology
- Evidence-based medicine – the assessment of the quality of evidence relevant to the risks and benefits of medical treatments
- Pharmacology – the study of the interactions that occur between a living organism and drugs that alter normal biochemical function
  - Biopharmacology – the pharmacology of biopharmaceuticals
  - Clinical pharmacology – the scientific discipline focused on rational drug development and utilization in therapeutics
  - Pharmacokinetics – the study of the fate of drugs administered to the body
    - Bioequivalence – the biological equivalence of two preparations of a drug
  - Pharmacodynamics – the study of the biochemical and physiological effects of drugs on the body
  - Pharmacometrics – the science of interpreting and describing pharmacology in a quantitative fashion
- Pharmacovigilance – the detection, assessment, understanding and prevention of adverse effects of medicines

== Drug terminology ==
- Active ingredient – the substance in a drug that is pharmaceutically active
- Approved drug – a drug that has been approved for marketing by a regulatory body such as the U.S. Food and Drug Administration or the European Medicines Agency
- Excipient – an inactive substance used as a carrier for the active ingredients of a drug
- Medicinal product – any substance or combination of substances used for treating or preventing disease in humans
- Off-label use – the practice of prescribing a drug for an indication for which the drug has not been approved
- Orphan drug – a drug used to treat a rare medical condition, or orphan disease
- Placebo – a sham treatment given to a control group in a clinical study
- Prescription drug – a licensed medicine that can only be obtained by prescription from a doctor
- Standard treatment – a currently available drug used in an active control clinical study

== Types of study design ==
Clinical study design

- Blind experiment
- Case report
- Case series
- Case study
- Case-control study
- Clinical control group
- Cohort study
- Cross-sectional study
- Crossover study
- First-in-man study
- Longitudinal study
- Minimisation
- Multicenter trial
- Nested case-control study
- Observational study
- Open-label trial
- Placebo-controlled studies
- Prospective cohort study
- Randomized controlled trial
- Retrospective cohort study
- Run-in period
- Seeding trial
- Vaccine trial

== Study participant confidentiality and safety ==
Human subject research

- Adverse drug reaction
- Adverse event
- Council for International Organizations of Medical Sciences
- Data confidentiality in clinical trials
- Data monitoring committees
- Ethics Committee (European Union)
- EudraVigilance
- Exclusion criteria
- Great ape research ban
- Inclusion criteria
- Institutional review board
- MedWatch
- Safety monitoring
- Serious adverse event
- Suspected Adverse Reaction Surveillance Scheme

== Clinical study management ==
- Clinical monitoring
- Clinical Trial Management System
- Good clinical practice

=== Clinical research documents ===
- Clinical trial protocol
- Informed consent
- Investigator's brochure
- Source document
- Standing operating procedure

=== Clinical research personnel ===
- Clinical investigator
- Clinical research associate
- Clinical research coordinator

=== Contract research organizations ===
Contract research organization

- PPD
- Fortrea
- Parexel
- Quintiles
- Westat

== Data collection and management ==
Clinical data acquisition

- Case report form
- Clinical data management system
- Clinical data repository
- Data clarification form
- Electronic data capture
- Good clinical data management practice
- Patient diary
- Patient-reported outcome
- Remote data entry

=== Medical term coding dictionaries ===
Medical classification

- Uppsala Monitoring Centre
- COSTART
- MedDRA
- Systematized Nomenclature of Medicine (SNOMED)
- WHOART
- Common Terminology Criteria for Adverse Events

=== Clinical Data Interchange Standards Consortium ===
Clinical Data Interchange Standards Consortium

- Study Data Tabulation Model (SDTM)
- Standard for Exchange of Non-clinical Data (SEND)
- JANUS clinical trial data repository

== Data analysis ==
Analysis of clinical trials

- Censoring (clinical trials)
- Effect size
- End point of clinical trials
- Hazard ratio
- Meta-analysis
- Number needed to harm
- Number needed to treat
- Odds ratio
- Intention to treat analysis
- Post-hoc analysis
- Relative risk
- Risk–benefit analysis
- Sensitivity and specificity
- Subgroup analysis
- Substantial equivalence
- Surrogate endpoint
- Systematic review
- Therapeutic effect

=== Interim analysis ===
- Interim analysis
- Haybittle–Peto boundary
- O'Brien–Fleming boundary
- Pocock boundary

== Results reporting ==
- Medical writing
- Clinical trials publication
- Common Technical Document
- Consolidated Standards of Reporting Trials (CONSORT)
- Electronic Common Technical Document
- Preferred Reporting Items for Systematic Reviews and Meta-Analyses (PRISMA)
- Strengthening the reporting of observational studies in epidemiology (STROBE)
- Uniform Requirements for Manuscripts Submitted to Biomedical Journals (URM)

== Notable clinical studies ==
- British Doctors Study – in 1956 provided convincing statistical proof that tobacco smoking increased the risk of lung cancer.
- Framingham Heart Study – a cardiovascular study based in Framingham, Massachusetts, which began in 1948 with 5,209, and is now on its third generation of participants.
- Heart Protection Study – the largest study to investigate the use of statins in the prevention of cardiovascular disease.
- International Studies of Infarct Survival – four randomized controlled trials of several drugs for treating suspected acute myocardial infarction.
- Intersalt study – a landmark observational study that showed a strong association between dietary salt and risk of cardiovascular disease.
- JUPITER trial – the first clinical trial to demonstrate that statin therapy may provide benefit to patients with low-to-normal LDL levels and no known cardiovascular disease.
- Multicenter AIDS Cohort Study – a study of over 6,000 men infected with HIV that has been ongoing for over 25 years
- Stateville Penitentiary Malaria Study – a controlled study of the effects of malaria on the inmates of Stateville Penitentiary near Joliet, Illinois.
- Tuskegee Study of Untreated Syphilis in the Negro Male – a clinical study, conducted between 1932 and 1972 in Tuskegee, Alabama studied the natural progression of the disease if left untreated.

== Legislation, regulations and guidances ==
=== European Union ===
- Directive 2001/20/EC
- Directive 2001/83/EC
- Directive 2005/28/EC
- Directive 65/65/EEC
- Directive 93/41/EEC
- Directive 95/46/EC on the protection of personal data

=== United States ===
- Federal Food, Drug, and Cosmetic Act (FD&C) – gives authority to the Food and Drug Administration (FDA) to oversee the safety of food, drugs, and cosmetics.
  - Kefauver Harris Amendment – requires drug manufacturers to provide proof of the effectiveness and safety of drugs before approval.
- Prescription Drug User Fee Act – allows the Food and Drug Administration (FDA) to collect fees from drug manufacturers to fund the new drug approval process.
- Title 21 of the Code of Federal Regulations – the section of Federal regulations that interprets and enforces FD&C.
- Title 21 CFR Part 11 – defines the criteria under which electronic records and electronic signatures are considered to be trustworthy, reliable and equivalent to paper records.
- Health Insurance Portability and Accountability Act (HIPAA) – Title II of HIPAA addresses the security and privacy of health data, including data collected from subjects in clinical research.

=== Other ===
- Declaration of Helsinki (United Nations)
- Food and Drugs Act (Canada)
- International Conference on Harmonisation of Technical Requirements for Registration of Pharmaceuticals for Human Use (European Union, Japan, and United States)

== Government agencies ==
- Australian Drug Evaluation Committee
- European Medicines Agency
  - Committee for Medicinal Products for Human Use
- Federal Agency for Medicines and Health Products (Belgium)
- Medicines and Healthcare products Regulatory Agency (United Kingdom)
- Ministry of Health, Labour and Welfare (Japan)
- Norwegian Medicines Agency
- State Food and Drug Administration (China)
- Swedish Medical Products Agency
- Therapeutic Products Directorate (Canada)
- Therapeutic Goods Administration (Australia)

=== United States Food and Drug Administration ===
Food and Drug Administration

==== Departments ====
- Commissioner of Food and Drugs – as head of the Food and Drug Administration, the commissioner reports to the Secretary of the Department of Health and Human Services
- Center for Biologics Evaluation and Research – responsible for review and approval of biologic products, including vaccines, blood products, gene therapy and human cloning
- Center for Devices and Radiological Health – responsible for review and approval of medical devices and safety of non-medical equipment that emit certain types of radiation
- Center for Drug Evaluation and Research – responsible for review and approval of all drugs
- Office of Regulatory Affairs – enforces FDA laws and regulations

==== Review and approval programs ====
- Investigational Device Exemption – allows an investigational device to be used in a clinical study in order to collect safety and effectiveness data
- Investigational New Drug – allows an investigational drug to be used in a clinical study in order to collect safety and effectiveness data
- New Drug Application – a submission to the FDA by a pharmaceutical company for review and approval of a new drug
  - Abbreviated New Drug Application – a submission to the FDA review and approval of a generic drug
  - FDA Fast Track Development Program – a designation given to an NDA by the FDA that accelerates review and approval of new drugs

== See also ==
- Glossary of clinical research
- List of biotechnology articles
