= Glossary of clinical research =

A glossary of terms used in clinical research.

== A ==
Activities of daily living

The tasks of everyday life. These activities include eating, dressing, getting into or out of a bed or chair, taking a bath or shower, and using the toilet. Instrumental activities of daily living are activities related to independent living and include preparing meals, managing money, shopping, doing housework, and using a telephone. Also called ADL. (NCI)

Adverse drug reaction

In the preapproval clinical experience with a new medicinal product or its new usages, particularly as the therapeutic dose(s) may not be established, all noxious and unintended responses to a medicinal product related to any dose should be considered adverse drug reactions. The phrase "responses to a medicinal product" means that a causal relationship between a medicinal product and an adverse event is at least a reasonable possibility, i.e., the relationship cannot be ruled out. Regarding marketed medicinal products: A response to a drug that is noxious and unintended and that occurs at doses normally used in man for prophylaxis, diagnosis, or therapy of diseases or for modification of physiological function. (ICH E6)

Adverse effect

An unwanted side effect of treatment. (NCI)

Adverse event

- An unexpected medical problem that happens during treatment with a drug or other therapy. Adverse events do not have to be caused by the drug or therapy, and they may be mild, moderate, or severe. (NCI)
- An AE is any untoward medical occurrence in a patient or clinical investigation subject administered a pharmaceutical product and that does not necessarily have a causal relationship with this treatment. An AE can therefore be any unfavorable and unintended sign (including an abnormal laboratory finding), symptom, or disease temporally associated with the use of a medicinal (investigational) product, whether or not related to the medicinal (investigational) product (see the ICH guidance for Clinical Safety Data Management: Definitions and Standards for Expedited Reporting). (ICH E6)

Adverse reaction

An unwanted effect caused by the administration of drugs. Onset may be sudden or develop over time (NLM)

Advocacy and support groups

Organizations and groups that actively support participants and their families with valuable resources, including self-empowerment and survival tools. (NLM)

Animal model

An animal with a disease either the same as or like a disease in humans. Animal models are used to study the development and progression of diseases and to test new treatments before they are given to humans. (NCI)

Animal study

A laboratory experiment using animals to study the development and progression of diseases. Animal studies also test how safe and effective new treatments are before they are tested in people. (NCI)

Applicable regulatory requirement

Any law(s) and regulation(s) addressing the conduct of clinical trials of investigational products of the jurisdiction where trial is conducted. (ICH E6)

Approval (in relation to institutional review boards (IRBs))

The affirmative decision of the IRB that the clinical trial has been reviewed and may be conducted at the institution site within the constraints set forth by the IRB, the institution, good clinical practice (GCP), and the applicable regulatory requirements. (ICH E6)

Approved drugs

In the U.S., the Food and Drug Administration (FDA) must approve a substance as a drug before it can be marketed. The approval process involves several steps including pre-clinical laboratory and animal studies, clinical trials for safety and efficacy, filing of a New Drug Application by the manufacturer of the drug, FDA review of the application, and FDA approval/rejection of application (NLM)

Arm

Any of the treatment groups in a randomized trial. Most randomized trials have two "arms," but some have three "arms," or even more (NLM)

Audit

A systematic and independent examination of trial-related activities and documents to determine whether the evaluated trial-related activities were conducted, and the data were recorded, analyzed, and accurately reported according to the protocol, sponsor's standard operating procedures (SOPs), good clinical practice (GCP), and the applicable regulatory requirement(s). (ICH E6)

Audit certificate

A declaration of confirmation by the auditor that an audit has taken place. (ICH E6)

Audit report

A written evaluation by the sponsor's auditor of the results of the audit. (ICH E6)

Audit trail

Documentation that allows reconstruction of the course of events. (ICH E6)

== B ==
Baseline

- 1. Information gathered at the beginning of a study from which variations found in the study are measured. 2. A known value or quantity with which an unknown is compared when measured or assessed. 3. The initial time point in a clinical trial, just before a participant starts to receive the experimental treatment which is being tested. At this reference point, measurable values such as CD4 count are recorded. Safety and efficacy of a drug are often determined by monitoring changes from the baseline values. (NLM)
- An initial measurement that is taken at an early time point to represent a beginning condition, and is used for comparison over time to look for changes. For example, the size of a tumor will be measured before treatment (baseline) and then afterwards to see if the treatment had an effect. (NCI)

Bayesian approaches

Approaches to data analysis that provide a posterior probability distribution for some parameter (e.g. treatment effect), derived from the observed data and a prior probability distribution for the parameter. The posterior distribution is then used as the basis for statistical inference. (ICH E9)

Best practice

In medicine, treatment that experts agree is appropriate, accepted, and widely used. Health care providers are obligated to provide patients with the best practice. Also called standard therapy or standard of care. (NCI)

Bias

- In a scientific research study or clinical trial, a flaw in the study design or the method of collecting or interpreting information. Biases can lead to incorrect conclusions about what the study or clinical trial showed. (NCI)
- When a point of view prevents impartial judgment on issues relating to the subject of that point of view. In clinical studies, bias is controlled by blinding and randomization (NLM)
- The systematic tendency of any factors associated with the design, conduct, analysis and evaluation of the results of a clinical trial to make the estimate of a treatment effect deviate from its true value. Bias introduced through deviations in conduct is referred to as 'operational' bias. The other sources of bias listed above are referred to as 'statistical'. (ICH E9)

Bioavailable

The ability of a drug or other substance to be absorbed and used by the body. Orally bioavailable means that a drug or other substance that is taken by mouth can be absorbed and used by the body. (NCI)

Bioinformatics

The science of using computers, databases, and math to organize and analyze large amounts of biological, medical, and health information. Information may come from many sources, including patient statistics, tissue specimens, genetics research, and clinical trials. (NCI)

Biological drug

A substance that is made from a living organism or its products and is used in the prevention, diagnosis, or treatment diseases. Biological drugs include antibodies, interleukins, and vaccines. Also called biologic agent or biological agent. (NCI)

Biometrics

The science of collecting and analyzing biologic or health data using statistical methods. Biometrics may be used to help learn the possible causes of a disease in a certain group of people. Also called biostatistics and biometry. (NCI)

Biometry

The science of collecting and analyzing biologic or health data using statistical methods. Biometry may be used to help learn the possible causes of a disease in a certain group of people. Also called biostatistics and biometrics. (NCI)

Biostatistics

The science of collecting and analyzing biologic or health data using statistical methods. Biostatistics may be used to help learn the possible causes of a disease in a certain group of people. Also called biometry and biometrics. (NCI)

Blind

- A randomized trial is "Blind" if the participant is not told which arm of the trial he is on. A clinical trial is "Blind" if participants are unaware on whether they are in the experimental or control arm of the study; also called masked. (NLM)
- A procedure in which one or more parties to the trial are kept unaware of the treatment assignment(s). Single blinding usually refers to the subject(s) being unaware, and double blinding usually refers to the subject(s), investigator(s), monitor, and, in some cases, data analyst(s) being unaware of the treatment assignment(s). (ICH E6)

Blind review

The checking and assessment of data during the period of time between trial completion (the last observation on the last subject) and the breaking of the blind, for the purpose of finalising the planned analysis. (ICH E9)

Blinded study

A type of study in which the patients (single-blinded) or the patients and their doctors (double-blinded) do not know which drug or treatment is being given. The opposite of a blinded study is an open label study. (NCI)

== C ==
Candidate

A descriptor which is applied to any substance or process which is being investigated for clinical use but either has not commenced, or has not completed, clinical trials. Examples: candidate vaccine, candidate formulation.

Case report

A detailed report of the diagnosis, treatment, and follow-up of an individual patient. Case reports also contain some demographic information about the patient (for example, age, gender, ethnic origin). (NCI)

Case report form

A printed, optical, or electronic document designed to record all of the protocol-required information to be reported to the sponsor on each trial subject. (ICH E6)

Case series

A group or series of case reports involving patients who were given similar treatment. Reports of case series usually contain detailed information about the individual patients. This includes demographic information (for example, age, gender, ethnic origin) and information on diagnosis, treatment, response to treatment, and follow-up after treatment. (NCI)

Case-control study

A study that compares two groups of people: those with the disease or condition under study (cases) and a very similar group of people who do not have the disease or condition (controls). Researchers study the medical and lifestyle histories of the people in each group to learn what factors may be associated with the disease or condition. For example, one group may have been exposed to a particular substance that the other was not. Also called a retrospective study. (NCI)

Clinical

Pertaining to or founded on observation and treatment of participants, as distinguished from theoretical or basic science. (NLM)

Clinical investigation

Any experiment that involves a test article and one or more human subjects (21CFR50.3)

Clinical investigator

A medical researcher in charge of carrying out a clinical trial's protocol. (NLM)

Clinical practice guidelines

Guidelines developed to help health care professionals and patients make decisions about screening, prevention, or treatment of a specific health condition. (NCI)

Clinical researcher

A health professional who works directly with patients, or uses data from patients, to do research on health and disease and to develop new treatments. Clinical researchers may also do research on how health care practices affect health and disease. (NCI)

Clinical series

A case series in which the patients receive treatment in a clinic or other medical facility. (NCI)

Clinical study or Clinical trial

- A type of research study that tests how well new medical approaches work in people. These studies test new methods of screening, prevention, diagnosis, or treatment of a disease. Also called a clinical trial. (NCI)
- A clinical trial is a research study to answer specific questions about vaccines or new therapies or new ways of using known treatments. Clinical trials (also called medical research and research studies) are used to determine whether new drugs or treatments are both safe and effective. Carefully conducted clinical trials are the fastest and safest way to find treatments that work in people. Trials are in four phases: Phase I tests a new drug or treatment in a small group; Phase II expands the study to a larger group of people; Phase III expands the study to an even larger group of people; and Phase IV takes place after the drug or treatment has been licensed and marketed. (NLM)
- Any investigation in human subjects intended to discover or verify the clinical, pharmacological, and/or other pharmacodynamic effects of an investigational product(s), and/or to identify any adverse reactions to an investigational product(s), and/or to study absorption, distribution, metabolism, and excretion of an investigational product(s) with the object of ascertaining its safety and/or efficacy. The terms clinical trial and clinical study are synonymous. (ICH E6)

Clinical Trial/Study Report

A written description of a trial/study of any therapeutic, prophylactic, or diagnostic agent conducted in human subjects, in which the clinical and statistical description, presentations, and analyses are fully integrated into a single report. (ICH E6)

Clinician

A health professional who takes care of patients. (NCI)

Cohort (statistics)

- A group of individuals who share a common trait, such as birth year. In medicine, a cohort is a group that is part of a clinical trial or study and is observed over a period of time. (NCI)
- In epidemiology, a group of individuals with some characteristics in common. (NLM)

Cohort study

A research study that compares a particular outcome in groups of individuals who are alike in many ways but differ by a certain characteristic (for example, female nurses who smoke compared with those who do not smoke). (NCI)

Community-based clinical trial (CBCT)

A clinical trial conducted primarily through primary-care physicians rather than academic research facilities. (NLM)

Comparator

An investigational or marketed product (i.e., active control), or placebo, used as a reference in a clinical trial. (ICH E6)

Compassionate use

A method of providing experimental therapeutics prior to final FDA approval for use in humans. This procedure is used with very sick individuals who have no other treatment options. Often, case-by-case approval must be obtained from the FDA for "compassionate use" of a drug or therapy. (NLM)

Compassionate use trial

A way to provide an investigational therapy to a patient who is not eligible to receive that therapy in a clinical trial, but who has a serious or life-threatening illness for which other treatments are not available. Compassionate use trials allow patients to receive promising but not yet fully studied or approved therapies when no other treatment option exists. Also called expanded access trial. (NCI)

Complementary and alternative therapy

Broad range of healing philosophies, approaches, and therapies that Western (conventional) medicine does not commonly use to promote well-being or treat health conditions. Examples include acupuncture, herbs, etc. Internet Address: http://www.nccih.nih.gov. (NLM)

Compliance

Adherence to all the trial-related requirements, good clinical practice (GCP) requirements, and the applicable regulatory requirements. (ICH E6)

Confidentiality regarding trial participants

- Refers to maintaining the confidentiality of trial participants including their personal identity and all personal medical information. The trial participants' consent to the use of records for data verification purposes should be obtained prior to the trial and assurance must be given that confidentiality will be maintained. (NLM)
- Prevention of disclosure, to other than authorized individuals, of a sponsor's proprietary information or of a subject's identity. (ICH E6)

Consecutive case series

A clinical study that includes all eligible patients identified by the researchers during the study registration period. The patients are treated in the order in which they are identified. This type of study usually does not have a control group. (NCI)

Content validity

The extent to which a variable (e.g. a rating scale) measures what it is supposed to measure. (ICH E9)

Contract

A written, dated, and signed agreement between two or more involved parties that sets out any arrangements on delegation and distribution of tasks and obligations and, if appropriate, on financial matters. The protocol may serve as the basis of a contract. (ICH E6)

Contract Research Organization

A person or an organization (commercial, academic, or other) contracted by the sponsor to perform one or more of a sponsor's trial-related duties and functions. (ICH E6)

Contraindication

A specific circumstance when the use of certain treatments could be harmful. (NLM)

Control

A control is the nature of the intervention control. (NLM)

Control animal

An animal in a study that does not receive the treatment being tested. Comparing the health of control animals with the health of treated animals allows researchers to evaluate the effects of a treatment more accurately. (NCI)

Control group

- In a clinical trial, the group that does not receive the new treatment being studied. This group is compared to the group that receives the new treatment, to see if the new treatment works. (NCI)
- The standard by which experimental observations are evaluated. In many clinical trials, one group of patients will be given an experimental drug or treatment, while the control group is given either a standard treatment for the illness or a placebo (NLM)

Controlled clinical trial

- A clinical study that includes a comparison (control) group. The comparison group receives a placebo, another treatment, or no treatment at all. (NCI)
- An experiment or clinical trial that includes a comparison (control) group. (NCI)

Controlled trials

Control is a standard against which experimental observations may be evaluated. In clinical trials, one group of participants is given an experimental drug, while another group (i.e., the control group) is given either a standard treatment for the disease or a placebo. (NLM)

Coordinating Committee

A committee that a sponsor may organize to coordinate the conduct of a multicenter trial. (ICH E6)

Coordinating Investigator

An investigator assigned the responsibility for the coordination of investigators at different centers participating in a multicenter trial. (ICH E6)

== D ==
Data and Safety Monitoring Board or Independent Data Monitoring Committee

- DSMB. An impartial group that oversees a clinical trial and reviews the results to see if they are acceptable. This group determines if the trial should be changed or closed. Also called DSMB. (NCI)
- An independent committee, composed of community representatives and clinical research experts, that reviews data while a clinical trial is in progress to ensure that participants are not exposed to undue risk. A DSMB may recommend that a trial be stopped if there are safety concerns or if the trial objectives have been achieved. (NLM)
- An independent data monitoring committee that may be established by the sponsor to assess at intervals the progress of a clinical trial, the safety data, and the critical efficacy endpoints, and to recommend to the sponsor whether to continue, modify, or stop a trial. (ICH E6 and ICH E9)

Diagnostic trials

Refers to trials that are conducted to find better tests or procedures for diagnosing a particular disease or condition. Diagnostic trials usually include people who have signs or symptoms of the disease or condition being studied. (NLM)

Direct Access

Permission to examine, analyze, verify, and reproduce any records and reports that are important to evaluation of a clinical trial. Any party (e.g., domestic and foreign regulatory authorities, sponsors, monitors, and auditors) with direct access should take all reasonable precautions within the constraints of the applicable regulatory requirement(s) to maintain the confidentiality of subjects' identities and sponsor's proprietary information. (ICH E6)

Documentation

All records, in any form (including, but not limited to, written, electronic, magnetic, and optical records; and scans, x-rays, and electrocardiograms) that describe or record the methods, conduct, and/or results of a trial, the factors affecting a trial, and the actions taken. (ICH E6)

Dose

The amount of medicine taken, or radiation given, at one time. (NCI)

Dose-dependent

Refers to the effects of treatment with a drug. If the effects change when the dose of the drug is changed, the effects are said to be dose-dependent. (NCI)

Dose-limiting

Describes side effects of a drug or other treatment that are serious enough to prevent an increase in dose or level of that treatment. (NCI)

Dose-ranging study

A clinical trial in which two or more doses of an agent (such as a drug) are tested against each other to determine which dose works best and is least harmful. (NLM)

Dose-rate

The strength of a treatment given over a period of time. (NCI)

Double-blind study

- A clinical trial design in which neither the participating individuals nor the study staff knows which participants are receiving the experimental drug and which are receiving a placebo (or another therapy). Double-blind trials are thought to produce objective results, since the expectations of the doctor and the participant about the experimental drug do not affect the outcome; also called double-masked study. (NLM)
- A clinical trial in which neither the medical staff nor the person knows which of several possible therapies the person is receiving. (NCI)

Double-dummy

A technique for retaining the blind when administering supplies in a clinical trial, when the two treatments cannot be made identical. Supplies are prepared for Treatment A (active and indistinguishable placebo) and for Treatment B (active and indistinguishable placebo). Subjects then take two sets of treatment; either A (active) and B (placebo), or A (placebo) and B (active). (ICH E9)

Dropout

A subject in a clinical trial who for any reason fails to continue in the trial until the last visit required of him/her by the study protocol. (ICH E9)

Drug

Any substance, other than food, that is used to prevent, diagnose, treat or relieve symptoms of a disease or abnormal condition. Also refers to a substance that alters mood or body function, or that can be habit-forming or addictive, especially a narcotic. (NCI)

Drug–drug interaction

A modification of the effect of a drug when administered with another drug. The effect may be an increase or a decrease in the action of either substance, or it may be an adverse effect that is not normally associated with either drug. (NLM)

== E ==
Efficacy

- The maximum ability of a drug or treatment to produce a result regardless of dosage. A drug passes efficacy trials if it is effective at the dose tested and against the illness for which it is prescribed. In the procedure mandated by the FDA, Phase II clinical trials gauge efficacy, and Phase III trials confirm it (NLM)
- Effectiveness. In medicine, the ability of an intervention (for example, a drug or surgery) to produce the desired beneficial effect. (NCI)

Eligibility criteria

- In clinical trials, requirements that must be met for an individual to be included in a study. These requirements help make sure that patients in a trial are similar to each other in terms of specific factors such as age, general health, and previous treatment. When all participants meet the same eligibility criteria, it gives researchers greater confidence that results of the study are caused by the intervention being tested and not by other factors. (NCI)
- Summary criteria for participant selection; includes Inclusion and Exclusion criteria. (NLM)

Empirical

Based on experimental data, not on a theory. (NLM)

Endpoint

- In clinical trials, an event or outcome that can be measured objectively to determine whether the intervention being studied is beneficial. The endpoints of a clinical trial are usually included in the study objectives. Some examples of endpoints are survival, improvements in quality of life, relief of symptoms, and disappearance of the tumor. (NCI)
- Overall outcome that the protocol is designed to evaluate. Common endpoints are severe toxicity, disease progression, or death. (NLM)

Enrolling

The act of signing up participants into a study. Generally this process involves evaluating a participant with respect to the eligibility criteria of the study and going through the informed consent process. (NLM)

Epidemiology

- The branch of medical science that deals with the study of incidence and distribution and control of a disease in a population. (NLM)
- The study of the patterns, causes, and control of disease in groups of people. (NCI)

Equivalence trial

A trial with the primary objective of showing that the response to two or more treatments differs by an amount which is clinically unimportant. This is usually demonstrated by showing that the true treatment difference is likely to lie between a lower and an upper equivalence margin of clinically acceptable differences. (ICH E9)

Essential Documents

Documents that individually and collectively permit evaluation of the conduct of a study and the quality of the data produced. (ICH E6)

Evaluable disease

Disease that cannot be measured directly by the size of the tumor but can be evaluated by other methods specific to a particular clinical trial. (NCI)

Evaluable patients

Patients whose response to a treatment can be measured because enough information has been collected. (NCI)

Expanded access

Refers to any of the FDA procedures, such as compassionate use, parallel track, and treatment IND that distribute experimental drugs to participants who are failing on currently available treatments for their condition and also are unable to participate in ongoing clinical trials. (NLM)

Expanded access trial

A way to provide an investigational therapy to a patient who is not eligible to receive that therapy in a clinical trial, but who has a serious or life-threatening illness for which other treatments are not available. Expanded access allows a patient to receive promising but not yet fully studied or approved therapies when no other treatment option exists. Also called compassionate use trial. (NCI)

Experimental

In clinical trials, refers to a drug (including a new drug, dose, combination, or route of administration) or procedure that has undergone basic laboratory testing and received approval from the U.S. Food and Drug Administration (FDA) to be tested in human subjects. A drug or procedure may be approved by the FDA for use in one disease or condition, but be considered experimental in other diseases or conditions. Also called investigational. (NCI)

Experimental drug

- A drug that is not FDA licensed for use in humans, or as a treatment for a particular condition (NLM)
- A substance that has been tested in a laboratory and has gotten approval from the U.S. Food and Drug Administration (FDA) to be tested in people. A drug may be approved by the FDA for use in one disease or condition but be considered experimental or investigational in other diseases or conditions. Also called investigational drug. (NCI)

== F ==
Follow-up

Monitoring a person's health over time after treatment. This includes keeping track of the health of people who participate in a clinical study or clinical trial for a period of time, both during the study and after the study ends. (NCI)

Food and Drug Administration (FDA)

The U.S. Department of Health and Human Services agency responsible for ensuring the safety and effectiveness of all drugs, biologics, vaccines, and medical devices, including those used in the diagnosis, treatment, and prevention of HIV infection, AIDS, and AIDS-related opportunistic infections. The FDA also works with the blood banking industry to safeguard the nation's blood supply. Internet address: https://www.fda.gov/. (NLM)

Frequentist methods

Statistical methods, such as significance tests and confidence intervals, which can be interpreted in terms of the frequency of certain outcomes occurring in hypothetical repeated realisations of the same experimental situation. (ICH E9)

Full analysis set

The set of subjects that is as close as possible to the ideal implied by the intention-to- treat principle. It is derived from the set of all randomised subjects by minimal and justified elimination of subjects. (ICH E9)

== G ==
Generalisability, Generalisation

The extent to which the findings of a clinical trial can be reliably extrapolated from the subjects who participated in the trial to a broader patient population and a broader range of clinical settings. (ICH E9)

Global assessment variable

A single variable, usually a scale of ordered categorical ratings, which integrates objective variables and the investigator's overall impression about the state or change in state of a subject. (ICH E9)

Good clinical practice

A standard for the design, conduct, performance, monitoring, auditing, recording, analyses, and reporting of clinical trials that provides assurance that the data and reported results are credible and accurate, and that the rights, integrity, and confidentiality of trial subjects are protected. (ICH E6)

== H ==
Healthy control

In a clinical study, a person who does not have the disorder or disease being studied. Results from healthy controls are compared to results from the group being studied. (NCI)

Historic cohort study

A research study in which the medical records of groups of individuals who are alike in many ways but differ by a certain characteristic (for example, female nurses who smoke and those who do not smoke) are compared for a particular outcome. Also called a retrospective cohort study. (NCI)

Historical control subject

An individual treated in the past and used in a comparison group when researchers analyze the results of a clinical study that had no control group. The use of a control, or comparison, group helps researchers determine the effects of a new treatment more accurately. (NCI)

Human subject

An individual who is or becomes a participant in research, either as a recipient of the test article or as a control. A subject may be either a healthy human or a patient. (21CFR50.3)

Hypothesis

A supposition or assumption advanced as a basis for reasoning or argument, or as a guide to experimental investigation. (NLM)

== I ==
Impartial Witness

A person, who is independent of the trial, who cannot be unfairly influenced by people involved with the trial, who attends the informed consent process if the subject or the subject's legally acceptable representative cannot read, and who reads the informed consent form and any other written information supplied to the subject. (ICH E6)

In vitro

In the laboratory (outside the body). The opposite of in vivo (in the body). (NCI)

In vivo

In the body. The opposite of in vitro (outside the body or in the laboratory). (NCI)

Incidence

The number of new cases of a disease diagnosed each year. (NCI)

Inclusion/exclusion criteria

The medical or social standards determining whether a person may or may not be allowed to enter a clinical trial. These criteria are based on such factors as age, gender, the type and stage of a disease, previous treatment history, and other medical conditions. Inclusion and exclusion criteria are not used to reject people personally, but rather to identify appropriate participants and keep them safe. (NLM)

Independent Ethics Committee

An independent body (a review board or a committee, institutional, regional, national, or supranational), constituted of medical/scientific professionals and nonmedical/nonscientific members, whose responsibility it is to ensure the protection of the rights, safety, and well-being of human subjects involved in a trial and to provide public assurance of that protection, by, among other things, reviewing and approving/providing favorable opinion on the trial protocol, the suitability of the investigator(s), facilities, and the methods and material to be used in obtaining and documenting informed consent of the trial subjects. The legal status, composition, function, operations, and regulatory requirements pertaining to Independent Ethics Committees may differ among countries, but should allow the Independent Ethics Committee to act in agreement with GCP as described in this guidance. (ICH E6)

Indication

In medicine, a sign, symptom, or medical condition that leads to the recommendation of a treatment, test, or procedure. (NCI)

Informed consent

- A process in which a person is given important facts about a medical procedure or treatment, a clinical trial, or genetic testing before deciding whether or not to participate. It also includes informing the patient when there is new information that may affect his or her decision to continue. Informed consent includes information about the possible risks, benefits, and limits of the procedure, treatment, trial, or genetic testing. (NCI)
- The process of learning the key facts about a clinical trial before deciding whether or not to participate. It is also a continuing process throughout the study to provide information for participants. To help someone decide whether or not to participate, the doctors and nurses involved in the trial explain the details of the study. (NLM)
- A process by which a subject voluntarily confirms his or her willingness to participate in a particular trial, after having been informed of all aspects of the trial that are relevant to the subject's decision to participate. Informed consent is documented by means of a written, signed, and dated informed consent form. (ICH E6)

Informed consent document

A document that describes the rights of the study participants, and includes details about the study, such as its purpose, duration, required procedures, and key contacts. Risks and potential benefits are explained in the informed consent document. The participant then decides whether or not to sign the document. Informed consent is not a contract, and the participant may withdraw from the trial at any time. (NLM)

Inspection

The act by a regulatory authority(ies) of conducting an official review of documents, facilities, records, and any other resources that are deemed by the authority(ies) to be related to the clinical trial and that may be located at the site of the trial, at the sponsor's and/or contract research organization's (CROs) facilities, or at other establishments deemed appropriate by the regulatory authority(ies). (ICH E6)

Institution

- Any public or private entity or agency or medical or dental facility where clinical trials are conducted. (ICH E6)
- Any public or private entity or agency (including Federal, State, and other agencies). (21CFR50.3)

Institutional Review Board (IRB)

- 1. A committee of physicians, statisticians, researchers, community advocates, and others that ensures that a clinical trial is ethical and that the rights of study participants are protected. All clinical trials in the U.S. must be approved by an IRB before they begin. 2. Every institution that conducts or supports biomedical or behavioral research involving human participants must, by federal regulation, have an IRB that initially approves and periodically reviews the research in order to protect the rights of human participants. (NLM)
- A group of scientists, doctors, clergy, and consumers that reviews and approves the action plan for every clinical trial. There is an Institutional Review Board at every health care facility that does clinical research. Institutional Review Boards are designed to protect the people who take part in a clinical trial. Institutional Review Boards check to see that the trial is well designed, legal, ethical, does not involve unnecessary risks, and includes safeguards for patients. Also called IRB. (NCI)
- An independent body constituted of medical, scientific, and nonscientific members, whose responsibility it is to ensure the protection of the rights, safety, and well-being of human subjects involved in a trial by, among other things, reviewing, approving, and providing continuing review of trials, of protocols and amendments, and of the methods and material to be used in obtaining and documenting informed consent of the trial subjects. (ICH E6)
- Any board, committee, or other group formally designated by an institution to review biomedical research involving humans as subjects, to approve the initiation of and conduct periodic review of such research. (21CFR50.3)

Intent to treat

- Analysis of clinical trial results that includes all data from participants in the groups to which they were randomized even if they never received the treatment. (NLM)
- The principle that asserts that the effect of a treatment policy can be best assessed by evaluating on the basis of the intention to treat a subject (i.e. the planned treatment regimen) rather than the actual treatment given. It has the consequence that subjects allocated to a treatment group should be followed up, assessed and analysed as members of that group irrespective of their compliance to the planned course of treatment. (ICH E9)

Interaction (Qualitative & Quantitative)

The situation in which a treatment contrast (e.g. difference between investigational product and control) is dependent on another factor (e.g. centre). A quantitative interaction refers to the case where the magnitude of the contrast differs at the different levels of the factor, whereas for a qualitative interaction the direction of the contrast differs for at least one level of the factor. (ICH E9)

Inter-rater reliability

The property of yielding equivalent results when used by different raters on different occasions. (ICH E9)

Interim analysis

Any analysis intended to compare treatment arms with respect to efficacy or safety at any time prior to the formal completion of a trial. (ICH E9)

Interim Clinical Trial/Study Report

A report of intermediate results and their evaluation based on analyses performed during the course of a trial. (ICH E6)

Intervention

- In medicine, a treatment or action taken to prevent or treat disease, or improve health in other ways. (NCI)
- Primary interventions being studied: types of interventions are Drug, Gene Transfer, Vaccine, Behavior, Device, or Procedure. (NLM)

Intervention group

The group receiving the study agent that is being tested in a clinical trial or clinical study. (NCI)

Intervention name

The generic name of the precise intervention being studied. (NLM)

Intra-rater reliability

The property of yielding equivalent results when used by the same rater on different occasions. (ICH E9)

Investigational

In clinical trials, refers to a drug (including a new drug, dose, combination, or route of administration) or procedure that has undergone basic laboratory testing and received approval from the U.S. Food and Drug Administration (FDA) to be tested in human subjects. A drug or procedure may be approved by the FDA for use in one disease or condition, but be considered investigational in other diseases or conditions. Also called experimental. (NCI)

Investigational drug

- A substance that has been tested in a laboratory and has gotten approval from the U.S. Food and Drug Administration (FDA) to be tested in people. A drug may be approved by the FDA for use in one disease or condition but be considered investigational in other diseases or conditions. Also called experimental drug. (NCI)
- A pharmaceutical form of an active ingredient or placebo being tested or used as a reference in a clinical trial, including a product with a marketing authorization when used or assembled (formulated or packaged) in a way different from the approved form, or when used for an unapproved indication, or when used to gain further information about an approved use. (ICH E6)

Investigational New Drug

A new drug, antibiotic drug, or biological drug that is used in a clinical investigation. It also includes a biological product used in vitro for diagnostic purposes. (NLM)

Investigator

- A researcher in a clinical trial or clinical study. (NCI)
- A person responsible for the conduct of the clinical trial at a trial site. If a trial is conducted by a team of individuals at a trial site, the investigator is the responsible leader of the team and may be called the principal investigator. (ICH E6)
- An individual who actually conducts a clinical investigation, i.e., under whose immediate direction the test article is administered or dispensed to, or used involving, a subject, or, in the event of an investigation conducted by a team of individuals, is the responsible leader of that team. (21CFR50.3)

Investigator's Brochure

A compilation of the clinical and nonclinical data on the investigational product(s) that is relevant to the study of the investigational product(s) in human subjects. (ICH E6)

== L ==
Legally Acceptable Representative

An individual or juridical or other body authorized under applicable law to consent, on behalf of a prospective subject, to the subject's participation in the clinical trial. (ICH E6)

Levels of evidence

A ranking system used to describe the strength of the results measured in a clinical trial or research study. The design of the study (such as a case report for an individual patient or a randomized double-blinded controlled clinical trial) and the endpoints measured (such as survival or quality of life) affect the strength of the evidence. (NCI)

== M ==
Masked

The knowledge of intervention assignment. (NLM)

Maximum tolerated dose

The highest dose of a drug or treatment that does not cause unacceptable side effects. The maximum tolerated dose is determined in clinical trials by testing increasing doses on different groups of people until the highest dose with acceptable side effects is found. Also called MTD. (NCI)

Medication

A legal drug that is used to prevent, treat, or relieve symptoms of a disease or abnormal condition. (NCI)

Medicine

Refers to the practices and procedures used for the prevention, treatment, or relief of symptoms of a diseases or abnormal conditions. This term may also refer to a legal drug used for the same purpose. (NCI)

Meta-analysis

The formal evaluation of the quantitative evidence from two or more trials bearing on the same question. This most commonly involves the statistical combination of summary statistics from the various trials, but the term is sometimes also used to refer to the combination of the raw data. (ICH E9)

Monitoring Report

A written report from the monitor to the sponsor after each site visit and/or other trial-related communication according to the sponsor's SOPs. (ICH E6)

Monitoring

The act of overseeing the progress of a clinical trial, and of ensuring that it is conducted, recorded, and reported in accordance with the protocol, standard operating procedures (SOPs), GCP, and the applicable regulatory requirement(s). (ICH E6)

Multicenter study

- A clinical trial that is carried out at more than one medical institution. (NCI)
- A clinical trial conducted according to a single protocol but at more than one site, and, therefore, carried out by more than one investigator. (ICH E6 and ICH E9)

Multidisciplinary opinion

A treatment planning approach in which a number of doctors who are experts in different specialties (disciplines) review and discuss the medical condition and treatment options of a patient. (NCI)

Multiplicity

A large number or variety. (NCI)

== N ==
National Institutes of Health

NIH. A federal agency in the U.S. that conducts biomedical research in its own laboratories; supports the research of non-Federal scientists in universities, medical schools, hospitals, and research institutions throughout the country and abroad; helps in the training of research investigators; and fosters communication of medical information. Access the National Institutes of Health Web site at http://www.nih.gov. Also called NIH. (NCI)

Natural history study

- A study that follows a group of people over time who have, or are at risk of developing, a specific medical condition or disease. A natural history study collects health information in order to understand how the medical condition or disease develops and how to treat it. (NCI)
- Study of the natural development of something (such as an organism or a disease) over a period of time. (NLM)

New Drug Application (NDA)

An application submitted by the manufacturer of a drug to the FDA - after clinical trials have been completed - for a license to market the drug for a specified indication. (NLM)

Nonblinded

Describes a clinical trial or other experiment in which the researchers know what treatments are being given to each study subject or experimental group. If human subjects are involved, they know what treatments they are receiving. (NCI)

Nonclinical Study

Biomedical studies not performed on human subjects. (ICH E6)

Nonconsecutive case series

A clinical study that includes some, but not all, of the eligible patients identified by the researchers during the study registration period. This type of study does not usually have a control group. (NCI)

Non-inferiority trial

A trial with the primary objective of showing that the response to the investigational product is not clinically inferior to a comparative agent (active or placebo control). (ICH E9)

Nonrandomized clinical trial

A clinical trial in which the participants are not assigned by chance to different treatment groups. Participants may choose which group they want to be in, or they may be assigned to the groups by the researchers. (NCI)

== O ==
Objective improvement

An improvement that can be measured by the health care provider (NCI)

Objective response

A measurable response. (NCI)

Observation

Closely monitoring a patient's condition but withholding treatment until symptoms appear or change. Also called watchful waiting, active surveillance, and expectant management. (NCI)

Observational study

A type of study in which individuals are observed or certain outcomes are measured. No attempt is made to affect the outcome (for example, no treatment is given). (NCI)

Off-label

- Describes the legal use of a prescription drug to treat a disease or condition for which the drug has not been approved by the U.S. Food and Drug Administration. (NCI)
- A drug prescribed for conditions other than those approved by the FDA. (NLM)

Open label study

- A type of study in which both the health providers and the patients are aware of the drug or treatment being given. (NCI)
- A clinical trial in which doctors and participants know which drug or vaccine is being administered. (NLM)

Orphan drugs

An FDA category that refers to medications used to treat diseases and conditions that occur rarely. There is little financial incentive for the pharmaceutical industry to develop medications for these diseases or conditions. Orphan drug status, however, gives a manufacturer specific financial incentives to develop and provide such medications. (NLM)

Outcome

A specific result or effect that can be measured. Examples of outcomes include decreased pain, reduced tumor size, and improvement of disease. (NCI)

Outpatient

A patient who visits a health care facility for diagnosis or treatment without spending the night. Sometimes called a day patient. (NCI)

Over-the-counter drug

A medicine that can be bought without a prescription (doctor's order). Examples include analgesics (pain relievers) such as aspirin and acetaminophen. Also called nonprescription and OTC. (NCI)

== P ==
Patient advocate

A person who helps a patient work with others who have an effect on the patient's health, including doctors, insurance companies, employers, case managers, and lawyers. A patient advocate helps resolve issues about health care, medical bills, and job discrimination related to a patient's medical condition. (NCI)

Peer review

Review of a clinical trial by experts chosen by the study sponsor. These experts review the trials for scientific merit, participant safety, and ethical considerations. (NLM)

Per protocol set (Valid Cases, Efficacy Sample, Evaluable Subjects Sample)

The set of data generated by the subset of subjects who complied with the protocol sufficiently to ensure that these data would be likely to exhibit the effects of treatment, according to the underlying scientific model. Compliance covers such considerations as exposure to treatment, availability of measurements and absence of major protocol violations. (ICH E9)

Pharmacokinetics

The processes (in a living organism) of absorption, distribution, metabolism, and excretion of a drug or vaccine. (NLM)

Phase I clinical trials

- The first step in testing a new treatment in humans. These studies test the best way to give a new treatment (for example, by mouth, intravenous infusion, or injection) and the best dose. The dose is usually increased a little at a time in order to find the highest dose that does not cause harmful side effects. Because little is known about the possible risks and benefits of the treatments being tested, phase I trials usually include only a small number of patients who have not been helped by other treatments. (NCI)
- Initial studies to determine the metabolism and pharmacologic actions of drugs in humans, the side effects associated with increasing doses, and to gain early evidence of effectiveness; may include healthy participants and/or patients. (NLM)
- Phase 1 includes the initial introduction of an investigational new drug into humans. Phase 1 studies are typically closely monitored and may be conducted in patients or normal volunteer subjects. These studies are designed to determine the metabolism and pharmacologic actions of the drug in humans, the side effects associated with increasing doses, and, if possible, to gain early evidence on effectiveness. During Phase 1, sufficient information about the drug's pharmacokinetics and pharmacological effects should be obtained to permit the design of well-controlled, scientifically valid, Phase 2 studies. The total number of subjects and patients included in Phase 1 studies varies with the drug, but is generally in the range of 20 to 80. Phase 1 studies also include studies of drug metabolism, structure-activity relationships, and mechanism of action in humans, as well as studies in which investigational drugs are used as research tools to explore biological phenomena or disease processes. (21CFR312)

Phase I/II trial

A trial to study the safety, dosage levels, and response to a new treatment. (NCI)

Phase II clinical trials

- A study to test whether a new treatment has an effect (NCI)
- Controlled clinical studies conducted to evaluate the effectiveness of the drug for a particular indication or indications in patients with the disease or condition under study and to determine the common short-term side effects and risks. (NLM)
- Phase 2 includes the controlled clinical studies conducted to evaluate the effectiveness of the drug for a particular indication or indications in patients with the disease or condition under study and to determine the common short-term side effects and risks associated with the drug. Phase 2 studies are typically well controlled, closely monitored, and conducted in a relatively small number of patients, usually involving no more than several hundred subjects. (21CFR312)

Phase II/III trial

A trial to study response to a new treatment and the effectiveness of the treatment compared with the standard treatment regimen. (NCI)

Phase III clinical trials

- A study to compare the results of people taking a new treatment with the results of people taking the standard treatment (for example, which group has better survival rates or fewer side effects). In most cases, studies move into phase III only after a treatment seems to work in phases I and II. Phase III trials may include hundreds of people. (NCI)
- Expanded controlled and uncontrolled trials after preliminary evidence suggesting effectiveness of the drug has been obtained, and are intended to gather additional information to evaluate the overall benefit-risk relationship of the drug and provide and adequate basis for physician labeling. (NLM)
- Phase 3 studies are expanded controlled and uncontrolled trials. They are performed after preliminary evidence suggesting effectiveness of the drug has been obtained, and are intended to gather the additional information about effectiveness and safety that is needed to evaluate the overall benefit-risk relationship of the drug and to provide an adequate basis for physician labeling. Phase 3 studies usually include from several hundred to several thousand subjects. (21CFR312)

Phase IV clinical trial

- After a treatment has been approved and is being marketed, it is studied in a phase IV trial to evaluate side effects that were not apparent in the phase III trial. Thousands of people are involved in a phase IV trial. (NCI)
- Post-marketing studies to delineate additional information including the drug's risks, benefits, and optimal use. (NLM)

Pilot study

The initial study examining a new method or treatment. (NCI)

Placebo

- A placebo is an inactive pill, liquid, or powder that has no treatment value. In clinical trials, experimental treatments are often compared with placebos to assess the treatment's effectiveness. (NLM)
- An inactive substance or treatment that looks the same as, and is given the same way as, an active drug or treatment being tested. The effects of the active drug or treatment are compared to the effects of the placebo. (NCI)

Placebo controlled study

- A method of investigation of drugs in which an inactive substance (the placebo) is given to one group of participants, while the drug being tested is given to another group. The results obtained in the two groups are then compared to see if the investigational treatment is more effective in treating the condition. (NLM)
- Refers to a clinical study in which the control patients receive a placebo. (NCI)

Placebo effect

A physical or emotional change, occurring after a substance is taken or administered, that is not the result of any special property of the substance. The change may be beneficial, reflecting the expectations of the participant and, often, the expectations of the person giving the substance. (NLM)

Placebo therapy

An inactive treatment or procedure that is intended to mimic as closely as possible a therapy in a clinical trial. Also called sham therapy. (NCI) The term also refers to psychotherapy that obtains its positive effect through the use of principles of social influence.

Population study

A study of a group of individuals taken from the general population who share a common characteristic, such as age, sex, or health condition. This group may be studied for different reasons, such as their response to a drug or risk of getting a disease. (NCI)

Preclinical

- Refers to the testing of experimental drugs in the test tube or in animals - the testing that occurs before trials in humans may be carried out. (NLM)
- Research using animals to find out if a drug, procedure, or treatment is likely to be useful. Preclinical studies take place before any testing in humans is done. (NCI)

Predictive factor

A situation or condition that may increase a person's risk of developing a certain disease or disorder. (NCI)

Prevention

In medicine, action taken to decrease the chance of getting a disease or condition. (NCI)

Prevention trials

Refers to trials to find better ways to prevent disease in people who have never had the disease or to prevent a disease from returning. These approaches may include medicines, vaccines, vitamins, minerals, or lifestyle changes. (NLM)

Preventive

Used to prevent disease. (NCI)

Primary endpoint

The main result that is measured at the end of a study to see if a given treatment worked (e.g., the number of deaths or the difference in survival between the treatment group and the control group). What the primary endpoint will be is decided before the study begins. (NCI)

Prospective

In medicine, a study or clinical trial in which participants are identified and then followed forward in time. (NCI)

Prospective cohort study

A research study that follows over time groups of individuals who are alike in many ways but differ by a certain characteristic (for example, female nurses who smoke and those who do not smoke) and compares them for a particular outcome. (NCI)

Clinical trial protocol

- A study plan on which all clinical trials are based. The plan is carefully designed to safeguard the health of the participants as well as answer specific research questions. A protocol describes what types of people may participate in the trial; the schedule of tests, procedures, medications, and dosages; and the length of the study. While in a clinical trial, participants following a protocol are seen regularly by the research staff to monitor their health and to determine the safety and effectiveness of their treatment (NLM)
- An action plan for a clinical trial. The plan states what the study will do, how, and why. It explains how many people will be in it, who is eligible to participate, what study agents or other interventions they will be given, what tests they will receive and how often, and what information will be gathered. (NCI)
- A document that describes the objective(s), design, methodology, statistical considerations, and organization of a trial. The protocol usually also gives the background and rationale for the trial, but these could be provided in other protocol referenced documents. Throughout the ICH GCP Guidance, the term protocol refers to protocol and protocol amendments. (ICH E6)

Protocol Amendment

A written description of a change(s) to or formal clarification of a protocol. (ICH E6)

== Q ==
Quality Assurance

All those planned and systematic actions that are established to ensure that the trial is performed and the data are generated, documented (recorded), and reported in compliance with GCP and the applicable regulatory requirement(s). (ICH E6)

Quality Control

The operational techniques and activities undertaken within the quality assurance system to verify that the requirements for quality of the trial related activities have been fulfilled. (ICH E6)

Quality of life trials (or supportive care trials)

Refers to trials that explore ways to improve comfort and quality of life for individuals with a chronic illness. (NLM)

== R ==
Randomization

- A method based on chance by which study participants are assigned to a treatment group. Randomization minimizes the differences among groups by equally distributing people with particular characteristics among all the trial arms. The researchers do not know which treatment is better. From what is known at the time, any one of the treatments chosen could be of benefit to the participant (NLM)
- When referring to an experiment or clinical trial, the process by which animal or human subjects are assigned by chance to separate groups that compare different treatments or other interventions. Randomization gives each participant an equal chance of being assigned to any of the groups. (NCI)
- The process of assigning trial subjects to treatment or control groups using an element of chance to determine the assignments in order to reduce bias. (ICH E6)

Randomized clinical trial

- A study in which the participants are assigned by chance to separate groups that compare different treatments; neither the researchers nor the participants can choose which group. Using chance to assign people to groups means that the groups will be similar and that the treatments they receive can be compared objectively. At the time of the trial, it is not known which treatment is best. It is the patient's choice to be in a randomized trial. (NCI)
- A study in which participants are randomly (i.e., by chance) assigned to one of two or more treatment arms of a clinical trial. Occasionally placebos are utilized. (NLM)

Recruiting

The period during which a trial is attempting to identify and enroll participants. Recruitment activities can include advertising and other ways of soliciting interest from possible participants (NLM)

Recruitment status

Indicates the current stage of a trial, whether it is planned, ongoing, or completed. (NLM)

Regimen

A treatment plan that specifies the dosage, the schedule, and the duration of treatment. (NCI)

Regulatory Authorities

Bodies having the power to regulate. In the ICH GCP guidance, the expression "Regulatory Authorities" includes the authorities that review submitted clinical data and those that conduct inspections. These bodies are sometimes referred to as competent authorities. (ICH E6)

Retrospective

Looking back at events that have already taken place. (NCI)

Retrospective cohort study

A research study in which the medical records of groups of individuals who are alike in many ways but differ by a certain characteristic (for example, female nurses who smoke and those who do not smoke) are compared for a particular outcome. Also called a historic cohort study. (NCI)

Retrospective study

A study that compares two groups of people: those with the disease or condition under study (cases) and a very similar group of people who do not have the disease or condition (controls). Researchers study the medical and lifestyle histories of the people in each group to learn what factors may be associated with the disease or condition. For example, one group may have been exposed to a particular substance that the other was not. Also called a case-control study. (NCI)

Risk-benefit ratio

The risk to individual participants versus the potential benefits. The risk/benefit ratio may differ depending on the condition being treated. (NLM)

== S ==
Safety & tolerability

The safety of a medical product concerns the medical risk to the subject, usually assessed in a clinical trial by laboratory tests (including clinical chemistry and haematology), vital signs, clinical adverse events (diseases, signs and symptoms), and other special safety tests (e.g. ECGs, ophthalmology). The tolerability of the medical product represents the degree to which overt adverse effects can be tolerated by the subject. (ICH E9)

Screening trials

Refers to trials which test the best way to detect certain diseases or health conditions. (NLM)

Selection bias

An error in choosing the individuals or groups to take part in a study. Ideally, the subjects in a study should be very similar to one another and to the larger population from which they are drawn (for example, all individuals with the same disease or condition). If there are important differences, the results of the study may not be valid. (NCI)

Serious Adverse Event

Any untoward medical occurrence that at any dose: results in death, is life-threatening, requires inpatient hospitalization or prolongation of existing hospitalization, results in persistent or significant disability/incapacity, or is a congenital anomaly/birth defect. (ICH E6)

Sham therapy

An inactive treatment or procedure that is intended to mimic as closely as possible a therapy in a clinical trial. Also called placebo therapy. (NCI)

Side effect

- A problem that occurs when treatment affects healthy tissues or organs. (NCI)
- Any undesired actions or effects of a drug or treatment. Negative or adverse effects may include headache, nausea, hair loss, skin irritation, or other physical problems. Experimental drugs must be evaluated for both immediate and long-term side effects (NLM)

Significant

In statistics, describes a mathematical measure of difference between groups. The difference is said to be significant if it is greater than what might be expected to happen by chance alone. Also called statistically significant. (NCI)

Single blind study

- A type of clinical trial in which only the doctor knows whether a patient is taking the standard treatment or the new treatment being tested. This helps prevent bias in treatment studies. (NCI)
- A study in which one party, either the investigator or participant, is unaware of what medication the participant is taking; also called single-masked study. (NLM)

Source Data

All information in original records and certified copies of original records of clinical findings, observations, or other activities in a clinical trial necessary for the reconstruction and evaluation of the trial. Source data are contained in source documents (original records or certified copies). (ICH E6)

Source Documents

Original documents, data, and records (e.g., hospital records, clinical and office charts, laboratory notes, memoranda, subjects' diaries or evaluation checklists, pharmacy dispensing records, recorded data from automated instruments, copies or transcriptions certified after verification as being accurate and complete, microfiches, photographic negatives, microfilm or magnetic media, x-rays, subject files, and records kept at the pharmacy, at the laboratories, and at medico-technical departments involved in the clinical trial). (ICH E6)

Sponsor

- An individual, company, institution, or organization that takes responsibility for the initiation, management, and/or financing of a clinical trial. (ICH E6)
- A person who initiates a clinical investigation, but who does not actually conduct the investigation, i.e., the test article is administered or dispensed to or used involving, a subject under the immediate direction of another individual. A person other than an individual (e.g., corporation or agency) that uses one or more of its own employees to conduct a clinical investigation it has initiated is considered to be a sponsor (not a sponsor-investigator), and the employees are considered to be investigators. (21CFR50.3)

Sponsor-Investigator

- An individual who both initiates and conducts, alone or with others, a clinical trial, and under whose immediate direction the investigational product is administered to, dispensed to, or used by a subject. The term does not include any person other than an individual (e.g., it does not include a corporation or an agency). The obligations of a sponsor-investigator include both those of a sponsor and those of an investigator. (ICH E6)
- An individual who both initiates and actually conducts, alone or with others, a clinical investigation, i.e., under whose immediate direction the test article is administered or dispensed to, or used involving, a subject. The term does not include any person other than an individual, e.g., corporation or agency. (21CFR50.3)

Standard treatment

A treatment currently in wide use and approved by the FDA, considered to be effective in the treatment of a specific disease or condition. (NLM)

Standards of care

Treatment regimen or medical management based on state of the art participant care. (NLM)

Standard Operating Procedures

Detailed, written instructions to achieve uniformity of the performance of a specific function. (ICH E6)

Statistical analysis plan

A statistical analysis plan is a document that contains a more technical and detailed elaboration of the principal features of the analysis described in the protocol, and includes detailed procedures for executing the statistical analysis of the primary and secondary variables and other data. (ICH E9)

Statistical significance

The probability that an event or difference occurred by chance alone. In clinical trials, the level of statistical significance depends on the number of participants studied and the observations made, as well as the magnitude of differences observed. (NLM)

Study endpoint

A primary or secondary outcome used to judge the effectiveness of a treatment. (NLM)

Study type

The primary investigative techniques used in an observational protocol; types are Purpose, Duration, Selection, and Timing. (NLM)

Subinvestigator

Any individual member of the clinical trial team designated and supervised by the investigator at a trial site to perform critical trial-related procedures and/or to make important trial-related decisions (e.g., associates, residents, research fellows). (ICH E6)

Subject Identification Code

A unique identifier assigned by the investigator to each trial subject to protect the subject's identity and used in lieu of the subject's name when the investigator reports adverse events and/or other trial-related data. (ICH E6)

Subject/Trial Subject

An individual who participates in a clinical trial, either as a recipient of the investigational product(s) or as a control. (ICH E6)

Superiority trial

A trial with the primary objective of showing that the response to the investigational product is superior to a comparative agent (active or placebo control). (ICH E9)

Surrogate variable

A variable that provides an indirect measurement of effect in situations where direct measurement of clinical effect is not feasible or practical. (ICH E9)

== T ==
Test article

Any drug (including a biological product for human use), medical device for human use, human food additive, color additive, electronic product, or any other article subject to regulation under the FD&C Act (21CFR50.3)

Toxicity

An adverse effect produced by a drug that is detrimental to the participant's health. The level of toxicity associated with a drug will vary depending on the condition which the drug is used to treat. (NLM)

Treatment effect

An effect attributed to a treatment in a clinical trial. In most clinical trials the treatment effect of interest is a comparison (or contrast) of two or more treatments. (ICH E9)

Treatment emergent

An event that emerges during treatment having been absent pre-treatment, or worsens relative to the pre-treatment state. (ICH E9)

Treatment IND

IND stands for Investigational New Drug application, which is part of the process to get approval from the FDA for marketing a new prescription drug in the U.S. It makes promising new drugs available to desperately ill participants as early in the drug development process as possible. Treatment INDs are made available to participants before general marketing begins, typically during Phase III studies. To be considered for a treatment IND a participant cannot be eligible to be in the definitive clinical trial. (NLM)

Treatment trials

Refers to trials which test new treatments, new combinations of drugs, or new approaches to surgery or radiation therapy. (NLM)

Trial Site

The location(s) where trial-related activities are actually conducted. (ICH E6)

Trial statistician

A statistician who has a combination of education/training and experience sufficient to implement the principles in this guidance and who is responsible for the statistical aspects of the trial. (ICH E9)

t-test

A statistical test that is used to find out if there is a real difference between the means (averages) of two different groups. It is sometimes used to see if there is a significant difference in response to treatment between groups in a clinical trial. (NCI)

== U ==
Uncontrolled study

A clinical study that lacks a comparison (i.e., a control) group. (NCI)

Unexpected Adverse Drug Reaction

An adverse reaction, the nature or severity of which is not consistent with the applicable product information (e.g., Investigator's Brochure for an unapproved investigational product or package insert/summary of product characteristics for an approved product). (ICH E6)

== V ==
Vulnerable Subjects

Individuals whose willingness to volunteer in a clinical trial may be unduly influenced by the expectation, whether justified or not, of benefits associated with participation, or of a retaliatory response from senior members of a hierarchy in case of refusal to participate. Examples are members of a group with a hierarchical structure, such as medical, pharmacy, dental, and nursing students, subordinate hospital and laboratory personnel, employees of the pharmaceutical industry, members of the armed forces, and persons kept in detention. Other vulnerable subjects include patients with incurable diseases, persons in nursing homes, unemployed or impoverished persons, patients in emergency situations, ethnic minority groups, homeless persons, nomads, refugees, minors, and those incapable of giving consent. (ICH E6)

== W ==
Well-being of the trial subjects

The physical and mental integrity of the subjects participating in a clinical trial. (ICH E6)

== See also ==
- Outline of clinical research
