= Clinical research coordinator =

A Clinical Research Coordinator (CRC) is a person responsible for conducting clinical trials using good clinical practice (GCP) under the auspices of a Principal Investigator (PI).

Good clinical practices principles have been defined by Madelene Ottosen, RN, MSN, of The University of Texas Health Science Center at Houston as:

- Trials are conducted ethically, as defined by the Declaration of Helsinki, rigorously, as defined by the International Conference on Harmonisation Guidelines (ICH).
- Benefits outweigh risks for each patient.
- Rights, safety and well-being of patients prevail over science.
- All available non-clinical and clinical information on any investigational agent can support the trial as designed.
- All trials are scientifically sound and clearly described.
- All clinical trials have current Institutional Review Board approval.
- Medical decisions and care are the responsibility of qualified health care professionals, specifically physicians and, if applicable, dentists.
- Everyone involved in the clinical trial is qualified by training, education and experience.
- Informed consent is given freely by every participant.
- All study documentation is recorded, handled and stored to allow accurate reporting, interpretation and verification.
- Confidentiality of subjects is respected and protected.
- Investigational products maintain Good Manufacturing Practice in storage, manufacturing and handling.
- Systems to ensure quality are implemented in all aspects of the trial.

The PI is responsible for the conduct of the trial, however, "CRCs are often involved in essential duties that have been traditionally performed by the PI, such as conducting the informed consent process and ensuring compliance with the protocol." The CRC's primary responsibility, as with all clinical research professionals, is the protection of human subjects, but the CRC has many other responsibilities. Although not inclusive, some of the CRC responsibilities include preparing the Institutional Review Board submission, writing the informed consent document, working with the institutional official in contract negotiations, developing a detailed cost analysis, negotiating the budget with the Sponsor (i.e., pharmaceutical company or granting agency), subject recruitment, patient care, adverse event reporting, preparing the case report form (CRF), submitting CRFs and other data to the Sponsor as necessary and study close-out.

== Responsibilities ==
=== Feasibility ===
A sponsor sends a feasibility questionnaire to the local research site. The Clinical Research Coordinator completes the form on behalf of the site to determine if the local site has the patient population, support staff, medical facilities, and equipment necessary to successfully carry out the study protocol.

=== Institutional Review Board submissions ===
All research involving human subjects must be approved by an Institutional Review Board (IRB). Each IRB has protocol submission requirements, which typically involve an IRB application and informed consent document. A study cannot begin without IRB approval.

=== Informed consent ===
The IRB must approve informed consent prior to study initiation, and often the CRC is liaison between the IRB and the sponsor. The sponsor sets informed consent requirements, as does the IRB. Each local IRB must review and approve the informed consent, but the CRC is responsible for communication between the IRB and the sponsor. §46.116 of the Code of Federal Regulations outlines the basic elements of informed consent as a:

1. Statement that the study involves research, an explanation of research purpose, expected duration of subject's participation, description of procedures, and identification of any experimental procedures
2. Description of any reasonably foreseeable risk or discomfort to the subject
3. Description of any benefits to the subject or others that can reasonably be expected
4. Disclosure of appropriate alternative procedures or courses of treatment, if any, that might be advantageous to the subject
5. Statement that describes extent, if any, to which confidentiality subject identity is maintained
6. Explanation (if more than minimal risk to test subject) as to any compensation, medical treatments available if injury occurs and, or where further information is available
7. List of whom to contact for pertinent questions about the research and subjects' rights, and whom to contact in the event of a research-related injury to the subject
8. Statement that participation is voluntary, refusal to participate involves no penalty or loss of benefits, and that the subject may discontinue participation at any time without penalty or loss of benefits

==== Additional elements ====
When appropriate, experimenters also tell each subject:

1. That the particular treatment or procedure may involve unforeseeable risks to the subject (or to an embryo or fetus, if relevant)
2. Circumstances under which investigator may end subject's participation without subject's consent
3. Additional costs to the subject that may result from participation in the research
4. Consequences of subject withdrawing from the research, and procedures for orderly termination of subject participation
5. That significant new findings during the research that could affect the subject's willingness to continue participation will be provided to the subject
6. The approximate number of subjects involved in the study

=== Contracting with pharmaceutical companies ===
The site conducting the clinical trial negotiates the clinical trial agreement (CTA) to conform to its policies and procedures. The resolution of many contractual issues requires coordination between the sponsor, the PI and the site, which is usually the responsibility of the CRC. The involvement of each party is essential to a successful CTA with mutually acceptable terms. The CTA should include terms for indemnification, confidentiality, publication, intellectual property, insurance, data safety and monitoring boards, subject injury, governing law and termination clauses.

=== Cost analysis and budget negotiations ===
To develop a cost analysis, the CRC reviews the protocol schema and determine which procedures are standard of care, versus research. Research charges are included in the budget—with personnel effort, site initiation costs, IRB fees throughout the life of the clinical trial, pharmacy costs, travel costs for the PI and CRC to attend investigator meetings, equipment, dedicated fax and computer lines, supplies, screen failures, subject stipends, subject travel costs, and any other items defined as a direct cost to the clinical trial. In addition, if the clinical trial is at an Academic Medical Center (AMC), an indirect cost rate applies to the direct study costs. The indirect rate is approximately 30% for pharmaceutical trials, and can be upwards of 50% for federal trials, depending on the AMC's federally negotiated indirect costs rate.

=== Subject recruitment ===
Prior to agreeing to conduct the clinical trial, the CRC (and the PI) determine if they have the appropriate patient population. The CRC is responsible for subject recruitment once the trial begins, or must establish the research team that recruits subjects. Viable subject recruitment must occur beforehand, as the clinical trial agreement stipulates the number of subjects the site must recruit.

=== Patient care ===
The CRC coordinates and conduct patient care visits and assures that all procedures comply with the protocol. The CRC interacts with the PI to assure the patient receives appropriate medical evaluation and care when needed and alerts the PI of any serious adverse events that occur during the study.

=== Adverse events ===
An adverse event is described as "any adverse change in health or "side-effect" that occurs in a person who participates in a clinical trial while the patient is receiving the treatment (study medication, application of the study device, etc.) or within a pre-specified period of time after their treatment has been completed." The CRC must report all adverse events to the sponsor and all serious adverse events to the IRB and sponsor.

=== Case report forms ===
The purpose of the case report form (CRF) is to collect relevant data in accordance with the protocol and in compliance with regulatory requirements. The CRC collects the data on the CRF and submit to the sponsor either electronically or paper format.

=== Electronic Data Capture ===
The electronic data capture (EDC) is an online database where the information collected on the Case Report forms (CRF), or source documents is entered. These are usually created by the study sponsor or their subcontractors.

=== Processing and shipping of laboratory samples ===
Many Clinical Trials and non-clinical research studies use laboratory assessments/samples to assess patient response and or Adverse Events. The CRC is frequently responsible for the basic laboratory preparation of labs samples such as making hematology slides, spinning and aliquoting blood samples or placing tissue in formalin or flash freezing. These blood or tissue samples may be analyzed locally or sent to central laboratories for processing and analysis. The CRC must abide by The International Air and Transportation Association regulations (IATA) for biologic sample shipments.

=== Study close ===
In accordance with the local IRB, the CRC completes IRB study close documentation and appropriately notifies study subjects, research team, and pharmacies. The CRC works with the sponsor's clinical monitor to complete outstanding monitoring findings and queries. In addition, the CRC must comply with record retention policies of the Food and Drug Administration (FDA), the ICH, and the clinical trial agreement.

== See also ==
- Adverse event
- Case report forms
- Clinical investigator
- Clinical Research Associate
- Clinical monitoring
- Clinical trial
- Clinical trial protocol
- Data monitoring committees
- Declaration of Helsinki
- Electronic Data Capture
- Food and Drug Administration
- Good clinical practice
- Good manufacturing practice
- Informed consent
- Institutional Review Board
- Medical research
- New investigator
- Nurses
- Principal investigator
