= Research assistant =

Person performing research for a university

A research assistant (RA) is a researcher employed, often on a temporary contract, by a university, research institute, or privately held organization to provide assistance in academic or private research endeavors. Research assistants work under the supervision of a principal investigator or supervisor and typically do not bear direct responsibility for the final outcomes of the research. However, in certain countries, research assistants can be the primary contributors to the research outcomes. Research assistants are commonly educated to at least degree level, and they may also be enrolled in postgraduate degree programs. In some cases, such as when pursuing a PhD, they are referred to as Doctoral Research Assistants and may also have teaching responsibilities alongside their research commitments.

== Undergraduate and post-doctoral level ==
Although research assistants are typically appointed at the graduate level, there are instances where undergraduate students are also employed to provide research support. In fields such as Economics and Business, there are numerous opportunities for undergraduates who have completed their college education to work as research assistants. These paid positions usually span one to two years and serve as valuable experience, particularly for individuals considering applying to PhD programs in Economics and Business. Applications for these research assistantship positions are typically submitted during the Fall quarter of the student's senior year.

Similarly, someone who has recently been awarded a doctoral degree may hold a temporary appointment as a postdoctoral research assistant. Postdoctoral research assistants usually contributes to independent research projects or to a larger research team as a part of academic institutions. Their work involves publishing article for academic journals, collecting data and analysing results and assisting in the preparation of grant applications to secure research fundings.

== Clinical research assistant ==
A clinical research assistant or clinical research associate is employed by a hospital or medical research centre, who is involved in the administration of clinical trials. They may assist a senior investigator with recruiting and enrolling research subjects, as well as with correspondence and grant applications.

== See also ==
- Academic freedom
- Graduate student
- Research associate
- Researcher
