= Academic clinical trial =

Type of clinical trial

An academic clinical trial is a clinical trial not funded by pharmaceutical or biotechnology company for commercial ends but by public-good agencies (usually universities or medical trusts) to advance medicine. These trials are a valuable component of the health care system; they benefit patients and help determine the safety and efficacy of drugs and devices, and play an important role in the checks and balances that regular commercially oriented clinical trials.

A typical area of academic clinical trials is the advancement and optimization of already existing therapies. Thus, academic clinical trials may for instance test how a combination of registered drugs may improve treatment outcomes; or they may apply registered treatments in additional, less frequent indications. Such research questions are not a primary focus of for-profit companies, and thus these trials are typically initiated by individual investigators or academic research organizations.

There are many different organizations which have an interest in academic clinical trials and facilitate or take part in their conduct. These organizations include:

- Hospitals, universities, researchers and institutions who view trials as a source of income and prestige, and receive private, charitable and governmental funding.
- Pharmaceutical or biotech companies who view the development and commercialization of treatments as their business.
- Regulators who wish to ensure treatments are safe and work effectively.
- Patients and patients' organizations and associations who want faster access to advanced treatments.

Academic clinical trials are run at academic sites, such as medical schools, academic hospitals, and universities; and non-academic sites which may be managed by so-called site management organizations (SMOs). Site management organizations are for-profit organizations which enlist and manage the physician practice sites that actually recruit and follow patients enrolled in clinical trials. In some cases, academic members participate in clinical trials as members of SMOs.

== See also ==
- Clinical investigator
- Clinical monitoring
- Clinical research associate
- Clinical site
- Clinical trial protocol
- Clinical trials publication
- EORTC (European Organisation for Research and Treatment of Cancer)
