= DSMB =

DSMB may stand for:

- Delayed surface marker buoy, an inflatable buoy used by SCUBA divers
- Data and safety monitoring board, an independent group of experts who monitor patient safety and treatment efficacy data while a clinical trial is ongoing
