= Washout =

Washout may refer to:

- Washout (erosion), the erosion of a soft surface by a gush of water
- Washout (aeronautics), the practice of building a wing with a twist from root to tip
- Washout (comics), a mutant character in the Marvel Comics universe
- "Washout", a song by The Fallout Trust
- "Washout", a 1991 episode of the PBS show Shining Time Station
- "Washout", a story from The Railway Series book "Thomas Goes Home"
- Washed Out, the stage name of chillwave musician Ernest Greene
- The well drilling process for enlarging a drill hole in an oil well
- A term for a sporting event cancelled due to rain; see Rainout (sports)
- An alternate name for a run-in period, a common phase in clinical research
- Radiocontrast washout, where radiocontrast disappears from a tissue
