= Veterinary Medicines Directorate =

Executive agency in the United Kingdom

Agency overview
- Formed: 1989
- Jurisdiction: United Kingdom
- Headquarters: Surrey, England
- Annual budget: £11.96 million (2003–2004)
- Parent department: Department for Environment, Food and Rural Affairs
- Website: gov.uk/vmd

The Veterinary Medicines Directorate (VMD) is an Executive Agency of the Department for Environment, Food and Rural Affairs (Defra) seeking to protect public health, animal health, the environment and promoting animal welfare by assuring the safety, quality and efficacy of veterinary medicines in the United Kingdom.

== Responsibilities ==
The VMD is responsible for:

- the assessment, issue and maintenance of all national Marketing Authorisations for veterinary medicines in accordance with European Community and UK legislation;
- acting as rapporteur/co-rapporteur or reference member state/concerned member state for designated European applications for centralised or decentralised authorisations;
- controls on the manufacture and distribution of veterinary medicinal products including inspections;
- pharmacovigilance through the surveillance of suspected adverse reactions (SARs), through the Suspected Adverse Reaction Surveillance Scheme (SARSS) – veterinary surgeons fill in form VLM252A;
- surveillance for residues of veterinary medicines in animals and animal products;
- the provision and implementation of policy advice on these matters to the Health and Agriculture Ministers who jointly form the Licensing Authority for veterinary medicines under the Medicines Act 1968;
- the management of the Research & Development (R&D) programme linked to veterinary medicine issues; and
- the co-ordination of Defra’s work in the area of antimicrobial resistance via the DARC Group, including development of a Government Veterinary Antimicrobial Resistance Surveillance Strategy.

== History ==
VMD was first established in 1989 and from 1990 was a Next Steps Agency of the Ministry of Agriculture, Fisheries and Food (MAFF). It became an Executive Agency of Defra on 7 June 2001.

== Work of VMD ==
The work of VMD is divided into three main areas, or "businesses":

- Licensing – the assessment of applications; issuing and maintenance of Marketing Authorisations; pharmacovigilance for veterinary medicines; and the licensing and inspection of manufacturers and wholesale dealers of veterinary medicines – main customers are Marketing Authorisation holders; manufacturers and importers of veterinary medicines; manufacturers of medicated animal feedingstuffs; retailers of veterinary medicines and medicated animal feedingstuffs; the veterinary profession; farmers and keepers of animals; other stakeholders include the European Medicines Agency (EMEA); DH; Food Standards Agency (FSA); and consumers.
- Residues – the surveillance for residues of veterinary medicines and banned substances in home produced livestock and animal products and imported animal products, reporting of results and co-ordinating follow-up action – we have contracts with other agencies and companies who carry out work on our behalf at abattoirs and other first processing industries, on farms and at retailers of meat and other animal products, and at ports. We also work with other stakeholders including consumer representative groups, the European Commission and the FSA.
- Policy – servicing, developing and implementing new policy/legislation on all aspects of veterinary medicines. Providing support to Ministers through briefing and advice on replies to correspondence and Parliamentary Questions. Day-to-day management of the veterinary medicines (R&D) programme on behalf of the Policy customer (Animal Health and Welfare Directorate, Defra) – we work closely with Ministers and officials of Defra and other Government Departments and Agencies including the FSA, the general public, industry, consumer representative groups, the European Commission, embassies and other representatives of foreign governments.

== Costs ==
Operational costs are recovered through charges to the veterinary pharmaceutical industry, the food industry, and Defra.

During 2003/2004 operational costs totalled £11,960,000:

- Licensing: £4,915,000 (paid for by the veterinary pharmaceutical industry)
- Statutory Residues: £3,693,000 (paid for by the food industry)
- Non-statutory Residues: £1,054,000 (paid for by Defra)
- Policy: £2,298,000 (paid for by Defra)
