= Generate:Biomedicines =

American biotechnology company

- Type: Public
- Traded as: Nasdaq: GENB
- Industry: Biotechnology
- Founded: August 2018; 8 years ago
- Founder: Flagship Pioneering
- Headquarters: Somerville, Massachusetts, United States
- Key people: Noubar Afeyan (chairman), Michael Nally (CEO)
- Website: generatebiomedicines.com

Generate:Biomedicines is a biotechnology company founded in 2018 and headquartered in Somerville, Massachusetts. It specializes in using machine learning to design and optimize proteins for therapeutic applications, with a focus on immunology, oncology, and infectious diseases.

== History ==
Generate:Biomedicines was founded in 2018 by Flagship Pioneering. The company was established to develop a data-driven approach to understanding the relationship between protein sequence and function with the aim of creating novel proteins for therapeutic purposes.

The company operated in stealth mode until its public unveiling on September 10, 2020. At that time, Generate announced its focus on using machine learning algorithms and big data to design biological compounds targeting multiple diseases, including SARS-CoV-2, the virus causing COVID-19. Its computational platform integrated vast datasets of protein structures and genetic sequences to develop governing rules for designing new proteins.

In March 2021, Mike Nally, formerly of Merck, joined as chief executive officer to advance the company's technology and operational capabilities. Under his leadership, Generate expanded its infrastructure and initiated multiple strategic collaborations.

By 2023, Generate had raised financing, including a $273 million Series C round, the largest biotech Series C of the year. These funds supported the company's first-in-human clinical trial for GB-0669, a monoclonal antibody targeting a conserved region of the SARS-CoV-2 spike protein, and its pipeline of 17 programs spanning immunology, infectious disease, and oncology.

In September 2024, Generate secured a partnership with Novartis, potentially worth over $1 billion, to leverage its generative artificial intelligence (AI) platform for the development of protein therapeutics. This agreement included $65 million in upfront payments and equity, along with milestone payments and royalties.

== Research and development ==
Generate's research is centered on leveraging machine learning to program proteins for specific functions. Its platform is trained on extensive datasets comprising 160,000 protein structures and 190 million genetic sequences. This system identifies patterns linking protein sequence, structure, and function, which are then used to design new therapeutic proteins.

The company's technology includes two core components: de novo protein generation, which allows for the creation of proteins without relying on existing biological templates, and an optimization suite to refine these proteins for therapeutic use. This approach addresses challenges like affinity, immunogenicity, and manufacturability.

Generate has applied its platform across various modalities, including antibodies, peptides, enzymes, and antibody-drug conjugates (ADCs). Notable research outputs include antibodies targeting SARS-CoV-2 and preclinical assets in oncology, developed in collaboration with institutions like MD Anderson Cancer Center.

To support its experimental work, Generate has invested in advanced facilities, such as a cryogenic electron microscopy (cryoEM) laboratory in Andover, Massachusetts. This lab enables the collection of high-resolution protein interaction data to further train its computational models.

Generate's pipeline includes clinical and preclinical candidates addressing conditions like severe asthma and non-small cell lung cancer. The company also collaborates with other organizations to expand its therapeutic scope, as evidenced by its partnerships with Amgen and Novartis.
