= Index of biotechnology articles =

Biotechnology is a technology based on biology, especially when used in agriculture, food science, and medicine.

Of the many different definitions available, the one formulated by the UN Convention on Biological Diversity is one of the broadest:

"Biotechnology means any technological application that uses biological systems, living organisms, or derivatives thereof, to make or modify products or processes for specific use." (Article 2. Use of Terms)

More about Biotechnology...

This page provides an alphabetical list of articles and other pages (including categories, lists, etc.) about biotechnology.

== A ==
Adeno-associated virus -- Agricultural biotechnology -- Agrobacterium -- Affimer -- Affymetrix -- Alcoholic beverages -- Category:Alcoholic beverages -- Algal fuel -- Amgen -- Antibiotic -- Antibody drug conjugate -- Antisense RNA -- Aptamer -- Assisted reproductive technology -- Artificial selection

== B ==
Bacteriology -- Biochemical engineering -- Biochip -- Biochemistry -- Biodiesel -- Bioengineering -- Bioethics -- Biofuel -- Biogas -- Biogen Idec -- Bioindicator -- Bioinformatics -- Category:Bioinformatics -- Bioleaching -- Biological agent -- Biological warfare -- Bioluminescence -- Biomedical Engineering -- Biomimetics -- Biomining -- Bionanotechnology -- Bionics --Biopharmacology -- Biophotonics -- Bioprocessing -- Bioprospecting -- Bioreactor -- Bioremediation -- Biostatistics -- Biostimulation -- Biosynthesis -- Biotechnology -- Category:Biotechnology -- Category:Biotechnology companies -- Category:Biotechnology products -- Bt corn

== C ==
Cancer immunotherapy -- CAR T cell -- Cell therapy -- Chemogenomics -- Chimera (genetics) -- Chinese hamster -- Chinese Hamster Ovary cell -- Chiron Corp. -- Cloning -- Compost -- Composting -- Computational biology -- Connectomics -- Convention on Biological Diversity -- Chromatography -- CRISPR -- CRISPR gene editing

== D ==
Designer baby -- Directive on the patentability of biotechnological inventions -- DNA microarray -- DNA sequencing -- Dolly -- Dwarfing

== E ==
Enzymes -- Electroporation -- Environmental biotechnology -- Ethanol -- Eugenics -- Extremophiles in biotechnology

== F ==
Fermentation -- Category:Fermented foods

== G ==
Gene knockout -- Gene therapy -- Genentech -- Generate:Biomedicines -- Genetic engineering -- Genetically modified crops --Genetically modified food -- Genetically modified food controversies -- Genetically modified maize -- Genetically modified organisms -- Genetics -- Genomics -- Genome editing -- Genzyme -- Global Knowledge Center on Crop Biotechnology - Glycomics -- Golden rice -- Green fluorescent protein

== H ==
Human cloning -- Human Genome Project

== I ==
Immunology -- Immunotherapy -- Immune suppression -- Industrial biotechnology -- Interactomics

== L ==
Lipidomics

== M ==
Machine learning in bioinformatics -- MedImmune -- Metabolic engineering -- Metabolomics -- Metagenomics -- Microbial Fuel Cell -- Microfluidics -- Millennium Pharmaceuticals -- Model Organism -- Molecular Biology -- Molecular machines -- Monoclonal antibodies -- Mycofiltration -- Mycoremediation

== N ==
Nanobiotechnology

== O ==
Omics

== P ==
Penicillin -- Phosphatases -- Pfizer Inc. -- Phage therapy -- Pharmacogenomics -- Pharming (genetics) -- Plant-made pharmaceuticals -- Plantibody -- Proteomics

== R ==
Recombinant DNA -- Regulation of the release of genetic modified organisms -- Reporter gene

== S ==
Selective breeding -- Serono -- Shotgun sequencing -- Stem cell -- STR multiplex systems -- Sustainability -- Sustainable development -- Synthetic biology

== T ==
Terminator technology -- Transcriptomics -- Transgenic animal -- Transgenic plants -- Transgenic plant production

== U ==
Use of biotechnology in pharmaceutical manufacturing

== V ==
Vaccine -- Vector -- Virology

== X ==
Xenotransplantation

== Z ==
Zoology
