= Run-in period =

Run-in period is a period between the recruitment and randomization phases of a clinical trial, when all participants receive the same treatment, which may be active treatment, a placebo or no treatment at all. The clinical data from this stage of a trial are only occasionally of value but can serve a valuable role in screening out ineligible or non-compliant participants, in ensuring that participants are in a stable condition, and in providing baseline observations. A run-in period is sometimes called a washout period if treatments that participants were using before entering the clinical trial are discontinued.

== See also ==
- Data management
- Randomized controlled trial
- Safety monitoring
- Serious adverse event
- Standard operating procedures
- Standard treatment
- Study population
