= Protein therapeutics =

Protein therapeutics are proteins used as experimental or approved therapies for disease states. They include "monoclonal antibodies (mAbs), peptide hormones, growth factors, plasma proteins, enzymes, and hemolytic factors" While proteins can be more specific and flexible in their mechanism of action compared to small-molecule drugs, duration of action and drug delivery can be a challenge.
