= Natural history study =

Study of a group of people over time regarding a specific medical condition or disease

In medicine, a natural history study is a study that follows a group of people over time who have, or are at risk of developing, a specific medical condition or disease. A natural history study collects health information over time to understand how the medical condition or disease develops and to give insight into how it might be treated.

A natural history study is often submitted when applying to the FDA or other regulatory agency as a baseline, to show the disease course for untreated patients. The natural history data is compared to the disease course of patients given a proposed therapy to show the effects of the therapy.
