= Intersalt study =

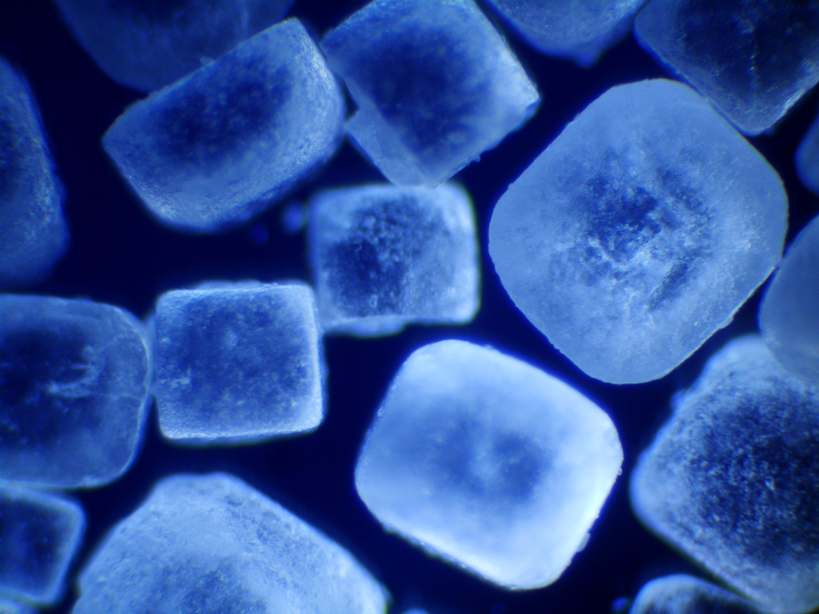
Table salt, crystals

The INTERSALT Study was a 1988 international observational study which investigated the link between dietary salt, as measured by urinary excretion, and blood pressure. The study was based on a sample of 10,079 men and women aged 20–59 sampled from 52 populations around the world. The authors of the study provided a widespread international investigation of the correlation between dietary salt intake and blood pressure in a systematic and standardized way with regards for relevant confounding variables, beyond just age and sex.

== Results ==
The study found a significant direct relationship between dietary salt intake, the urinary sodium:potassium ratio and systolic blood pressure, and between salt intake and the slope of blood pressure with age – both for all 52 populations, and for 48 populations excluding four low-sodium populations (Yanomamo and Xingu Indians of Brazil, Papua New Guinea and rural Kenya).

== Reception ==
The results were disputed by the Salt Institute (the salt producers' trade organisation, since disbanded), who demanded that the results be handed over for re-analysis. A re-analysis was published in 1996 and the results were the same. The results have since been confirmed by the TOHP I and TOHP II studies, trials of salt reduction and blood pressure in chimpanzees, meta-analyses of the human clinical trial data and the SSaSS trial of salt substitute and cardiovascular disease.
