= Veterinary pharmacovigilance in the United Kingdom =

Veterinary pharmacovigilance in the United Kingdom is overseen by the Veterinary Medicines Directorate (VMD).

== Overview ==
The Pharmacovigilance Unit at the VMD monitors adverse events; the monitoring carried out by this unit was previously known as the Suspect Adverse Reaction Surveillance Scheme, and is similar to the Yellow Card Scheme of pharmacovigilance for human medicine. The Pharmacovigilance Unit gathers information about suspected adverse events to veterinary medicines in both animals and humans, including suspected lack of expected efficacy, environmental problems, residues in foodstuffs. Anyone, including animal owners, can report suspected adverse events to the VMD, although veterinary surgeons submit most reports.

The marketing authorisation holder of a medicine, that is, the company that has the licence for the medicine, is legally obliged to inform the VMD of any adverse events which are reported to them. The following must be reported by marketing authorisation holders within 15 days:

- Serious SAEs (suspected adverse events that result in death, are life-threatening, results in significant disability or incapacity, are a congenital anomaly/birth defect, or that results in permanent or prolonged signs in the animals treated)
- Human adverse reactions (a reaction that is noxious and unintended and that occurs in a human being following exposure to a veterinary medicine)
- Unintended transmission of an infectious agent through a veterinary medicinal product

All other adverse events must be reported in a Periodic Safety Update Report. All SAEs (to animals and humans) should be reported by veterinary surgeons as this is considered good professional conduct (RCVS Guide to Professional Conduct).

Reporters can submit reports online. Hard copies of the reporting forms can also be requested from the VMD or downloaded and printed from the website.

The reports are monitored and analysed by the Pharmacovigilance team of the VMD, who make reports to the Veterinary Products Committee. Where the Secretary of State for Environment, Food and Rural Affairs considers, as a result of the evaluation of veterinary pharmacovigilance data that there is a significant safety concern, the marketing authorisation may be suspended, revoked or varied to restrict the indications, change the distribution category, amend the dose, add a contraindication, or add a new precautionary measure.
