= Clinical trials publication =

Publishing clinical trial research in peer-reviewed journal

Clinical trials publication is having research published in a peer reviewed journal following clinical trials. Most investigators will want to have such a publication but the nature of clinical trials may create special considerations and obstacles.

Most agreements for a clinical trial between sponsor and investigator grants that the sponsor may control publication of results by requesting publication delays, deleting portions of a manuscript, or placing limits on the types of issues that can be discussed. These controls serve to prevent disclosure of information that would compromise the sponsor's ability to patent inventions; to prevent disclosure of confidential information shared with investigator; and to coordinate the disclosure of results when a clinical trial is being conducted at multiple sites. These are legitimate business concerns, but may not restrict the investigator from freely publishing research results in the end of the study and approval process.

Due to repeated accusations and findings that some clinical trials conducted or funded by pharmaceutical companies may report only positive results for the preferred medication, the industry has been looked at much more closely by independent groups and government agencies. Issues and responses have included guidelines to limit financial inducements to researchers, journal articles presented as academic research actually being 'ghost-written' by pharmaceutical companies, litigation to deter or suppress publication of negative findings, concerns, or cheaper alternatives. and laws in the United States requiring advanced clinical trials to be registered on a public government website.

== See also ==
- Academic clinical trials
- Clinical trial
- Contract research organization
- Non-disclosure agreement
- Preregistration (science)
- Study 329
