= Monitoring in clinical trials =

Clinical monitoring is the oversight and administrative efforts that monitor a participant's health and efficacy of the treatment during a clinical trial. Both independent and government-run grant-funding agencies, such as the National Institutes of Health (NIH) and the World Health Organization (WHO), require data and safety monitoring protocols for Phase I and II clinical trials conforming to their standards.

== Safety monitoring ==
Safety monitoring of a clinical trial is conducted by an independent physician with relevant expertise. This is accomplished by review of adverse event, immediately after they occur, with timely follow-up through resolution.

Responsibility for data and safety monitoring depends on the phase of the study and may be conducted by sponsor or Contract research organization (CRO) staff or contractor, and/or by the Principal clinical investigator/project manager conducting the study. Regardless of the method used, monitoring must be performed on a regular basis. Oversight of the monitoring activity is the responsibility of the sponsor.

== Aspects of monitoring ==
According to the U.S. Food and Drug Administration's Center of Drug Evaluation and Research, the top five deficiency categories for site inspections caught by clinical monitors as reported in the 2001 Report to the Nation are:

- Failure to follow investigation protocol (the procedures and treatment subjects must undergo, as well as the schedule of assessments)
- Failure to keep adequate and accurate records
- Problems with the informed consent form
- Failure to report adverse events
- Failure to account for the disposition of study drugs

Therefore, the primary goal of clinical trial monitoring is to observe each trial site to ensure that the standardized operation procedures for the trial are being followed, reporting and managing any deviations from the investigation plan as they occur. Monitoring plans in the United States typically also require a clear protocol for reporting adverse/undesirable effects caused by the treatment to the institutional review board (IRB), the US Food & Drug Administration (FDA), and the institution funding the research. The FDA itself maintains an Adverse Event Reporting System for such occurrences in clinical trials it oversees in the United States.

== Functions of the clinical monitor ==
Clinical monitors execute the monitoring plan laid out by the sponsors and investigators of a clinical trial. Monitors may be referred to by many different titles, such as: Clinical Research Associate, "on-site" monitor, Clinical Research Monitor, Study Site Monitor and Quality Specialist. The number of clinical monitors depends on the scale and scope of the trial.

Almost all field monitoring requires regular visits to the site by the clinical research associate throughout the period of the study. On occasion, an extremely simple, low-risk study might be monitored almost exclusively by telephone except for the startup and closeout visits. Since the concept of "low risk" is subjective, this definition should be established in internal policies and procedures.

== Complexity of monitoring ==
The level of scrutiny of monitoring varies across studies based on risks and nature of the trial.

Considerations that affect the design of monitoring plans usually include:

- Complexity of the protocol (including toxicity, presence of special populations inside sample groups, amount of interaction needed, length of treatment, etc.)
- Risk of the treatment
- Disease being evaluated
- Number of study subjects enrolled at the site
- Number of treatment sites (such as number of clinics with access to and assigning the treatment)
- Site performance
- Sponsor monitoring standard operating protocols

Several of these factors depend on the phase of the clinical trial--for example, in some early Phase I studies of drugs whose effects on different individuals are unknown, the monitor may be required to be present during all or part of a subject's treatment, while Phase II investigations usually involve multiple investigation sites.

The overall monitoring plan should remain fairly consistent, but the strategy for individual sites may change considerably during the course of the study depending on study conditions and site performance.

== See also ==
- Clinical trials
- Data monitoring committee
- Drug development
- European Medicines Agency
- Safety monitoring
- U.S. Food and Drug Administration (FDA)
- Serious adverse event (SAE)

== Bibliography ==
- Carol Rados, Inside Clinical Trials Testing Medical Products in People FDA Consumer magazine, September–October 2003 Issue
