= Standard treatment =

The standard treatment, also known as the standard of care, is the medical treatment that is normally provided to people with a given condition. In many scientific studies, the control group receives the standard treatment rather than a placebo while a treatment group receives the experimental treatment. After the clinical trial, researchers compare the outcomes of the two groups to see if the experimental treatment is better than, as good as or not as beneficial as the standard treatment.

== Active (positive) concurrent control ==
In an active control or positive control trial, subjects are randomly assigned to the test treatment or to an active control treatment. Such clinical trials are usually double-blind, but this is not always possible; many oncology trials, for example, are considered difficult or impossible to blind because of different regimens, different routes of administration, and different toxicities. Active control trials can have two distinct objectives with respect to showing efficacy: (1) to show efficacy of the test treatment by showing it is as good as a known effective treatment or (2) to show efficacy by showing superiority of the test treatment to the active control. They may also be used with the primary objective of comparing the efficacy and/or safety of the two treatments. Whether the purpose of the trial is to show efficacy of the new treatment or to compare two treatments, the question of whether the trial would be capable of distinguishing effective from less effective or ineffective treatments is critical.

== See also ==
- Drug development
- New drug application
- U.S. Food and Drug Administration (FDA)
- European Medicines Agency
- International Conference on Harmonisation of Technical Requirements for Registration of Pharmaceuticals for Human Use
