= Clinical research associate =

Medical research professional

A clinical research associate (CRA), also called a clinical monitor or trial monitor, is a health-care professional who performs many activities related to medical research, particularly clinical trials. Clinical research associates work in various settings, such as pharmaceutical companies, medical research institutes and government agencies. Depending on the jurisdiction, different education and certification requirements may be necessary, although not usually required, to practice as a clinical research associate. The main tasks of the CRA are defined by good clinical practice guidelines for monitoring clinical trials, such as those elaborated by the International Council for Harmonisation of Technical Requirements for Pharmaceuticals for Human Use. A CRA would subsequently grow into a Feasibility Leader, Study Start up Leader, Project Manager, and Project Director at a Pharmaceutical company or a contract research organization. A CRA is usually required to possess an academic degree in Life Sciences and needs to have a good knowledge of good clinical practice and local regulations.

== Overview ==
The main function of a clinical research associate is to monitor clinical trials. The CRA may work directly with the sponsor company of a clinical trial, as an independent freelancer or for a contract research organization (CRO). A clinical research associate ensures compliance with the clinical trial protocol, checks clinical site activities, makes on-site visits, reviews case report forms (CRFs), and communicates with clinical research coordinators. Clinical research associates also "ensure the protection of the rights, safety and well being of human study subjects." Additionally, a CRA must "make certain that the scientific integrity of the data collected is protected and verified" and "ensure that adverse events are correctly documented and reported."

== Certification and practice ==
=== Canada ===
The Canadian Association of Clinical Research Specialists (CACRS) is a federally registered professional association in Canada (Reg. #779602-1). The CACRS is a not-for-profit organization that promotes and advocates on behalf of its members in the field of Clinical Research and Clinical Trials. The CACRS has a comprehensive accreditation program including the Clinical Research Specialist (CRS) designation, which is a professional title conferred by passing a qualifying exam. Applicants holding a doctorate degree in medicine or science are required 2 years of prior experience whereas bachelor's degree holders are required 3 years of prior experience prior to taking the qualifying exam.

=== European Union ===
In the European Union, the practice guidelines for CRAs are part of EudraLex.

=== India ===
In India, a CRA requires knowledge about New drugs and Clinical trials Rules, 2019 along with Drugs and Cosmetics Act, 1940 and Drugs and Cosmetics Rules, 1945.

=== United States ===
In the United States, the rules of good clinical practice are codified in Title 21 of the Code of Federal Regulations. CNNMoney listed Clinical Research Associate at #4 on their list of the "Best Jobs in America" in 2012, with a median salary of $90,700.

The Society of Clinical Research Associates (SOCRA) is a non-profit organization that is "dedicated to the continuing education and development of clinical research professionals". The Society of Clinical Research Associates (SOCRA) has developed an International Certification Program in order to create an internationally accepted standard of knowledge, education, and experience by which CRPs will be recognized as Certified Clinical Research Professionals (CCRP®s) in the clinical research community. The standards upon which this certification program is based have been set forth by this organization to promote recognition and continuing excellence in the ethical conduct of clinical trials. SOCRA provides training, continuing education, and a certification program. A CRA who is certified through SOCRA's certification program receives the designation of a Certified Clinical Research Professional (CCRP®).

The Association of Clinical Research Professionals (ACRP) provides a certification for CRAs, specific to the job function performed. The ACRP offers the designation of Certified Clinical Research Associate (CCRA®). In order to become accredited as a CCRA®, the Clinical Research Associate must pass a CCRA® examination in addition to meeting other specific requirements. Before taking the exam, the potential applicant must show that they "work independently of the investigative staff conducting the research at the site or institution," in order to ensure that the person will not have the opportunity to alter any data. The applicant must also show that they have worked a required number of hours in accordance with study protocols and Good Clinical Practices, including making sure that adverse drug reactions are reported and all necessary documentation is completed. The number of hours that must be completed performing these activities is based on the level of education achieved; for example, someone who has only graduated from high school must perform 6,000 hours, but a registered nurse, person with a bachelor's, masters, or doctorate of medicine degree must only perform 3,000 hours. The ACRP's CRA certification program is accredited by the National Commission for Certifying Agencies (NCCA), the accrediting body of the Institute for Credentialing Excellence.
