= Clinical investigator =

Investigator involved in clinical trials

A clinical investigator involved in a clinical trial is responsible for ensuring that an investigation is conducted according to the signed investigator statement, the investigational plan, and applicable regulations; for protecting the rights, safety, and welfare of subjects under the investigator's care; and for the control of drugs under investigation. The Clinical Investigator must also meet requirements set forth by the FDA, EMA or other regulatory body. The qualifications must be outlined in a current resume and readily available for auditors.

== See also ==
- Clinical site
- International Conference on Harmonisation of Technical Requirements for Registration of Pharmaceuticals for Human Use (ICH)
- Drug development
- Data monitoring committees
- Food and Drug Administration (FDA)
- European Medicines Agency (EMA)
- European Forum for Good Clinical Practice (EFGCP)
- American Society for Clinical Investigation (ASCI)
- European Society for Clinical Investigation (ESCI)
