= Data monitoring committee =

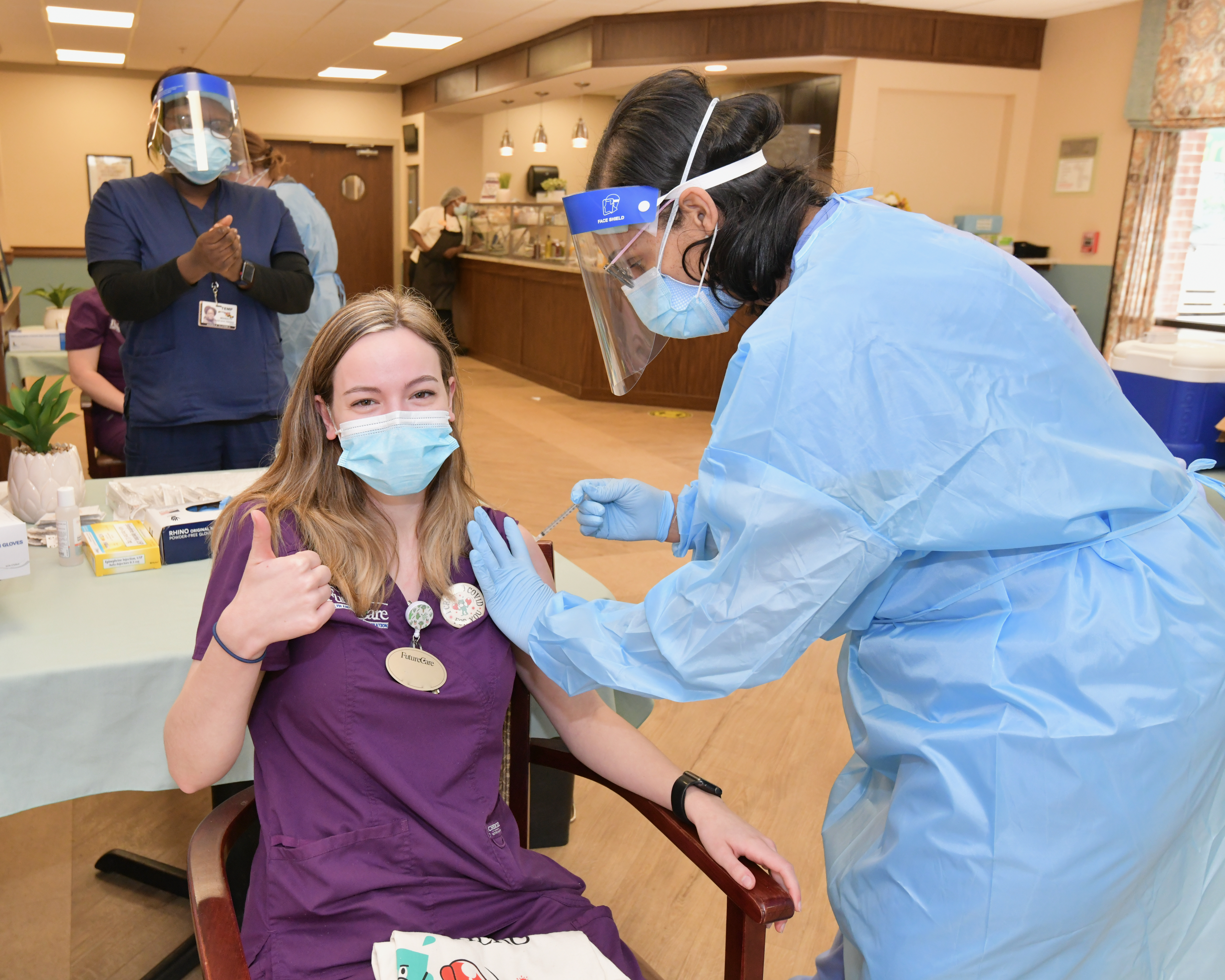
An early recipient of the COVID-19 vaccine

A data monitoring committee (DMC) – sometimes called a data and safety monitoring board (DSMB) – is an independent group of experts who monitor patient safety and treatment efficacy data while a clinical trial is ongoing.

== Need for a DMC ==
Many randomized clinical trials are double-blind – no one involved with the trial knows what treatment is to be given to each trial participant. Blinding includes the participant, their doctor, and even the study personnel at the company or organization sponsoring the trial. Blinding is breached and true assignments disclosed only after the trial database is finalized and locked against edits (i.e., until it is read-only for statistical analysis). On rare occasions a single participant's treating physician may be unblinded to the participant's study treatment assignment if that information is critical to the participant's immediate health care.

Clinical trials may test an unknown procedure or may continue for years, and there is justifiable concern about enrolling participants and exposing them to an unproven treatment without ongoing oversight of the preliminary results. The DMC is a group (typically 3 to 7 members) who are independent of the entity conducting the trial. At least one DMC member will be a statistician. Clinicians knowledgeable about the disease indication should be represented, as well as clinicians knowledgeable in the fields of any major suspected safety effects. Ethicists or representatives from a patient advocacy group may be included, particularly for research involving vulnerable populations. The DMC will convene at predetermined intervals (depending on the type of study) to review unblinded results. The DMC has the power to recommend continuation or termination of the study based on the evaluation of these results. There are typically three reasons a DMC might recommend termination of the study: safety concerns, outstanding benefit, and futility.

== Safety concerns ==
The primary mandate of the DMC is to protect patient safety. If adverse events of a particularly serious type are more common in the experimental arm compared to the control arm, then the DMC would have to strongly consider termination of the study. This evaluation has to be made in consideration of risk/benefit. In many cases, the experimental arm could cause serious adverse events (chemotherapy, for example), but the resulting improvement in survival outweighs these adverse events.

== Overwhelming benefit ==
In the fortunate situation that the experimental arm is shown to be undeniably superior to the control arm, the DMC may recommend termination of the trial. This would allow the sponsor of the trial to get regulatory approval earlier and to allow the superior treatment to reach the patient population earlier. There are cautions here, though. The statistical evidence of benefit needs to be clear and compelling, in part because shortening the study may reduce opportunities to identify as yet unknown risks. Further evaluation of long-term safety may also be done via phase IV, post-marketing studies.

== Futility ==
Futility is not as widely recognized as safety and benefit but actually can be the most common reason to stop a trial. As an example, suppose a trial is one-half completed, but the experimental arm and the control arm have nearly identical results. It is extremely unlikely that the trial, should it continue to its planned end (which could take months or years to reach, based on, particularly, rate of accrual), would have the statistical evidence needed to convince a regulatory agency to approve the treatment. Thus it is likely in no one's interest to have this trial continue. The sponsor of the study could save money for other projects by abandoning the futile trial. Also, current and potential trial participants could be freed to take other treatments, rather than this futile experimental treatment, which is unlikely to benefit them.

== See also ==
- Clinical trial protocol
- Drug development
- EudraVigilance
- Institutional review board
- Monitoring in clinical trials
- Pharmacovigilance
