= Clinical data management system =

Data management system used in clinical research

A clinical data management system (CDMS) is a tool used in clinical research to manage the data of a clinical trial. The clinical trial data gathered at the investigator site in the case report form are stored in the CDMS. To reduce the possibility of errors due to human entry, the systems employ various means to verify the data. Systems for clinical data management can be self-contained or part of the functionality of a CTMS. A CTMS with clinical data management functionality can help with the validation of clinical data as well as helps the site employ for other important activities like building patient registries and assist in patient recruitment efforts.

== Classification ==
The CDMS can be broadly divided into paper-based and electronic data capture systems.

=== Paper-based systems ===
Case report forms are manually filled at site and mailed to the company for which trial is being performed. The data on forms is transferred to the CDMS tool through data entry. The most popular method being double data entry where two different data entry operators enter the data in the system independently and both the entries are compared by the system. In case the entry of a value conflicts, system alerts and a verification can be done manually. Another method is Single Data Entry.

The data in CDMS are then transferred for the data validation. Also, in these systems during validation the data clarification from sites are done through paper forms, which are printed with the problem description and sent to the investigator site and the site responds by answering on forms and mailing them back.

=== Electronic data capturing systems ===
In such CDMSs, the investigators directly upload the data on CDMS, and the data can then be viewed by the data validation staff. Once the data are uploaded by site, the data validation team can send the electronic alerts to sites if there are any problems. Such systems eliminate paper usage in clinical trial validation of data.

== Clinical data management ==
Once data have been screened for typographical errors, the data can be validated to check for logical errors. An example is a check of the subject's date of birth to ensure that they are within the inclusion criteria for the study. These errors are raised for review to determine if there are errors in the data or if clarifications from the investigator are required.

Another function that the CDMS can perform is the coding of data. Currently, the coding is generally centered around two areas — adverse event terms and medication names. With the variance on the number of references that can be made for adverse event terms or medication names, standard dictionaries of these terms can be loaded into the CDMS. The data items containing the adverse event terms or medication names can be linked to one of these dictionaries. The system can check the data in the CDMS and compare them to the dictionaries. Items that do not match can be flagged for further checking. Some systems allow for the storage of synonyms to allow the system to match common abbreviations and map them to the correct term. As an example, ASA (acetylsalicylic acid) could be mapped to aspirin, a common notation. Popular adverse event dictionaries are MedDRA and WHOART and popular Medication dictionaries are COSTART and WHO Drug Dictionary.

At the end of the clinical trial the data set in the CDMS is extracted and provided to statisticians for further analysis. The analysed data are compiled into clinical study report and sent to the regulatory authorities for approval.

Most of the drug manufacturing companies are using Web-based systems for capturing, managing and reporting clinical data. This not only helps them in faster and more efficient data capture, but also speeds up the process of drug development. In such systems, studies can be set up for each drug trial. In-built edit checks help in removing erroneous data. The system can also be connected to other external systems. For example, RAVE can be connected to an IVRS (Interactive Voice Response System) facility to capture data through direct telephonic interviews of patients. Although IRT (Interactive Response Technology) systems (IVRS/IWRS) are most commonly associated to the enrollment of a patient in a study thus the system defining the arm of the treatment that the patient will take and the treatment kit numbers allocated to this arm (if applicable). Besides rather expensive commercial solutions, there are more and more open source clinical data management systems available on the market. CDMS implementations are required to comply with 21 CFR Part 11 federal regulations to be used for FDA registered drug trials. Part 11 requirements include audit trails, electronic signatures, and overall system validation.

== See also ==
- Clinical data management
- Clinical Quality Management System
- Clinical trial management system
- Clinical trial
- Electronic data capture
- Electronic Common Technical Document (eCTD)
- Drug development

== Bibliography ==
- Summerhayes, Stuart. CDM Regulations Procedures Manual. Blackwell Publishing. ISBN 1-4051-0740-5
- Tai B. C., Seldrup, J. (September 2000). A review of software for data management, design and analysis of clinical trials. Annals of the Academy of Medicine, Singapore. 29 (5): 576-81.
- Greenes, R. A.; Pappalardo, A. N.; Marble, C. W.; Barnett, G. O. (October 1969). Design and implementation of a clinical data management system, Comput Biomed Res. 2 (5): 469-85.
