= MediGuard =

iGuard Inc
- Company type: Private
- Founded: 2007
- Headquarters: Princeton, New Jersey, USA
- Key people: Hugo Stephenson, CEO; Elisa Cascade, Head Operations; Bob Winslow, Head Medical Information
- Products: Safety research and analysis
- Website: http://www.mediguard.org

MediGuard.org, operated by iGuard Inc., monitors the safety of prescribed medicines, over-the-counter medicines and healthcare supplements. As of February 2011, there are over 2,480,000 registered users in the website. The company also rates the safety of different drugs using a standardized ratings scale, and has received support from advocacy groups concerned with drug adverse effects.

The iGuard company was founded in 2007 by Hugo Stephenson, MD. It is a subsidiary of Quintiles Transnational, a multinational contract research organization.

== Criticism ==
Qualitative risk rating systems, such as that used by MediGuard, have been criticized for potentially simplifying risk assessment requirements used to inform risk management decisions.

== See also ==
- Boston Collaborative Drug Surveillance Program
- COSTART - Coding Symbols for a Thesaurus of Adverse Reaction Terms
- Pharmacovigilance
- Yellow Card Scheme (UK)
