= Black triangle (pharmacovigilance) =

Pharmaceutical symbol used in the UK

Black triangle

A black triangle appearing after the trade name of a British medicine (or vaccine) indicates that the medication is new to the market, or that an existing medicine (or vaccine) is being used for a new reason or by a new route of administration.

Examples of how it might appear:

- NewDrugTradeName^{▼}
- NewDrugTradeName▼

The black triangle also highlights the need for surveillance of any Adverse Drug Reactions (ADRs) that might arise from the use of a new medication. The Medicines and Healthcare products Regulatory Agency (MHRA) encourage anyone to voluntarily report ADRs (however minor) via the Yellow Card Scheme to gather more information and gain more understanding of a new medication.

After a new medicine (or vaccine) has been brought to the market there is still a lot that can be learned about the drug from its widespread use. Similarly, if an existing drug is being used in a situation where it was not used before or if it is being given by a different route of administration much can still be learned about its new or modified use.

The black triangle label generally stays with the new drug (or new use of an existing drug) for at least 5 years, when it is reviewed, and after this time the black triangle label may or may not be discontinued.

== See also ==
- Pharmacovigilance
- EudraVigilance
- Uppsala Monitoring Centre (WHO)
- British National Formulary
