= HMA =

HMA or hma may refer to:

- Hargrave Military Academy, a boarding school in Chatham, Virginia
- Harvard Musical Association, a private charitable organization
- Hawaiian Mission Academy, a school in Honolulu
- Heads of Medicines Agencies, a network of medicines agencies within the European Economic Area
- Health Management Associates (Arkansas company)
- Health Management Associates (Florida company)
- Herd Management Area, an area containing wild horses and/or wild burros managed by the Bureau of Land Management
- High memory area, in DOS computers
- HMA (VPN), a VPN provider
- Honda Manufacturing of Alabama, an automobile factory in the United States
- Hot-melt adhesive, a form of thermoplastic adhesive
- Southern Mashan Hmong language (ISO 639-3 code: hma)
- Khanty-Mansiysk Airport, Russia (IATA code: HMA)

== See also ==
- Her Majesty's Australian Ship, abbreviated to HMA Ship or HMAS
