= CDMS =

CDMS may refer to:

- Charge detection mass spectrometry
- Clinical Data Management System
- Clinically Definite Multiple Sclerosis
- Cryogenic Dark Matter Search
