= PRR =

PRR may refer to:

- Parietal reach region, of the human brain
- Pattern recognition receptor, receptors of the innate immune system that identify pathogen-associated molecular patterns
- Pennsylvania Railroad (reporting mark), an American railroad
- Personal Role Radio, a radio carried by UK troops
- Pichi Richi Railway, a heritage railway in South Australia
- Populist radical right, a loose collection of political ideologies
- Porsche Rennsport Reunion, an automotive event
- Princes Risborough railway station (National Rail station code), England
- Production Rule Representation, a proposed computing standard
- Proportional reporting ratio, a statistic used in data mining for health surveillance systems
- Pseudo-response regulator, a group of genes that are important in the circadian oscillator of plants
- Pure Reason Revolution, a British rock group formed in 2003
- Rio-grandense Republican Party (Portuguese: Partido Republicano Rio-Grandense), a defunct Brazilian political party
- Pulse Repetition Rate, a term used for electrical signals such as sonar

== See also ==
- PRRS (disambiguation)
