= Glatiramer acetate =

Medication

Clinical data
- Trade names: Copaxone, Glatopa, Brabio
- Other names: Copolymer 1, Cop-1
- AHFS/Drugs.com: Monograph
- MedlinePlus: a603016
- License data: US DailyMed: Glatiramer
- Pregnancy category: AU: B1
- Routes of administration: Subcutaneous injection
- ATC code: L03AX13 (WHO)

Legal status
- Legal status: AU: S4 (Prescription only); CA: ℞-only; UK: POM (Prescription only); US: ℞-only

Identifiers
- CAS Number: 147245-92-9
- PubChem CID: 3081884
- DrugBank: DB05259
- ChemSpider: none
- UNII: 5M691HL4BO
- ChEMBL: ChEMBL1201507
- CompTox Dashboard (EPA): DTXSID30163637
- ECHA InfoCard: 100.248.824

Chemical and physical data
- Formula: C_{25}H_{45}N_{5}O_{13}
- Molar mass: 623.657 g·mol^{−1}

Glatiramer acetate, sold under the brand name Copaxone among others, is an immunomodulator medication used to treat multiple sclerosis. Glatiramer acetate is approved in the United States to reduce the frequency of relapses, but not for reducing the progression of disability. Observational studies, but not randomized controlled trials, suggest that it may reduce progression of disability. While a conclusive diagnosis of multiple sclerosis requires a history of two or more episodes of symptoms and signs, glatiramer acetate is approved to treat a first episode anticipating a diagnosis. It is also used to treat relapsing-remitting multiple sclerosis. It is administered by subcutaneous injection.

It is a mixture of random-sized peptides that are composed of the four amino acids found in myelin basic protein, namely glutamic acid, lysine, alanine, and tyrosine. Myelin basic protein is the antigen in the myelin sheaths of the neurons that stimulates an autoimmune reaction in people with MS, so the peptide may work as a decoy for the attacking immune cells.

Glatiramer acetate was originally discovered at the Weizmann Institute of Science. It is on the World Health Organization's List of Essential Medicines.

== Medical uses ==
Glatiramer acetate is indicated for the treatment of relapsing forms of multiple sclerosis (MS), to include clinically isolated syndrome, relapsing-remitting disease, and active secondary progressive disease, in adults.

A 2010 Cochrane review concluded that glatiramer acetate had partial efficacy in "relapse-related clinical outcomes" but no effect on progression of the disease. As a result, it is approved by the US Food and Drug Administration (FDA) for reducing the frequency of relapses, but not for reducing the progression of disability.

== Adverse effects ==
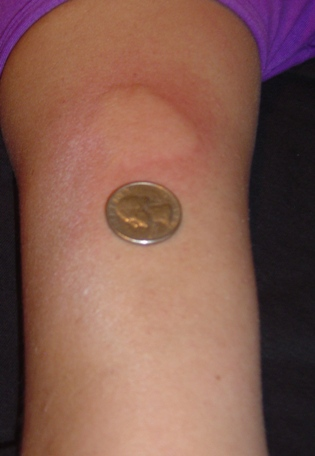
An injection site reaction on the upper left arm

In the US, the prescription label includes a boxed warning about a rare but serious allergic reaction called anaphylaxis.

Side effects may include a lump at the injection site (injection site reaction) in approximately 30% of users, and aches, fever, chills (flu-like symptoms) in approximately 10% of users. Side effect symptoms are generally mild in nature. A reaction that involves flushing, shortness of breath, anxiety and rapid heartbeat has been reported soon after injection in up to 5% of patients (usually after inadvertently injecting directly into a vein). These side effects subside within thirty minutes. Over time, a visible dent at a repeat-injection site can occur due to the local destruction of fat tissue, known as lipoatrophy, that may develop.

More serious side effects have been reported for glatiramer acetate, according to the prescription label in the US. These include serious side effects to the cardiovascular, digestive (including the liver), hematopoietic, lymphatic, musculoskeletal, nervous, respiratory, and urogenital systems as well as special senses (in particular the eyes). Metabolic and nutritional disorders have also been reported; however a link between glatiramer acetate and these adverse effects has not been established.

== Mechanism of action ==
Glatiramer acetate is a random polymer (average molecular mass 6.4 kDa) composed of four amino acids found in myelin basic protein. The mechanism of action for glatiramer acetate is not fully elucidated. It is thought to act by modifying immune processes that are believed to be responsible for the pathogenesis of MS. Administration of glatiramer acetate shifts the population of T cells from proinflammatory Th1 T-cells to regulatory Th2 T-cells that suppress the inflammatory response. This is done by the inhibition of secretion of proinflammatory cytokines (IL-1, IL-12, TNF, INFγ) by Th1 T-cells, thereby inducing Th2 T-cells to cross the blood–brain barrier and produce anti-inflammatory cytokines (IL-4, IL-5, IL-13, IL-10, TGF-β). Given its resemblance to myelin basic protein, glatiramer acetate may act as a decoy, diverting an autoimmune response against myelin. This hypothesis is supported by findings of studies that have been carried out to explore the pathogenesis of experimental autoimmune encephalomyelitis (EAE), a condition induced in several animal species through immunization against central nervous system derived material containing myelin and often used as an experimental animal model of MS. Studies in animals and in vitro systems suggest that upon its administration, glatiramer acetate-specific regulatory T cells (Tregs) are induced and activated in the periphery, inhibiting the inflammatory reaction to myelin basic protein.

The integrity of the blood–brain barrier, however, is not appreciably affected by glatiramer acetate, at least not in the early stages of treatment. Glatiramer acetate has been shown in clinical trials to reduce the number and severity of multiple sclerosis exacerbations.

== History ==
Three main clinical trials demonstrated its safety and efficacy: The first trial was performed in a single center, double-blind, placebo controlled trial and included 50 patients. The second trial was a two-year, multi-center, randomized, double-blind, placebo controlled trial and involved 251 patients. The third trial was a double-blind MRI study involving participation of 239 patients.

A 15-year followup of the original trial compared patients who continued with glatiramer to patients who dropped out of the trial. Patients with glatiramer had reduced relapse rates, and decreased disability progression and transition to secondary progressive MS, compared to patients who did not continue glatiramer. However, the two groups were not necessarily comparable, as it was no longer a randomized trial. There were no long-term safety issues.

== Society and culture ==
=== Legal status ===
Glatiramer acetate has been approved in various countries, including the United States, Israel, Canada, and 24 European Union countries. Approval in the U.S. was obtained in 1997. Glatiramer acetate was approved in the UK in August 2000. This first approval in a major European market led to approval across the European Union under the mutual recognition procedure.

=== Patent status ===
Novartis subsidiary Sandoz has marketed Glatopa since 2015, a generic version of the original Teva 20 mg formulation that requires daily injection.

Teva developed a long-acting 40 mg formulation, marketed since 2015, which reduced required injections to three per week. In October 2017, the FDA approved a generic version, which is manufactured in India by Natco Pharma, and imported and sold by Dutch firm Mylan. In February 2018, Sandoz received FDA approval for their generic version. In parallel with the development and approval processes, the generic competitors have disputed Teva's newer patents, any of which if upheld, would prevent marketing of long-acting generics.

While the patent on the chemical drug expired in 2015, Teva obtained new US patents covering pharmaceutical formulations for long-acting delivery. Litigation from industry competitors in 2016-2017 resulted in the new patents being judged invalid. In October 2018, the U.S. Court of Appeals for the Federal Circuit upheld the patent invalidation for obviousness. The case reflects the larger controversy over evergreening of branded drugs. On October 31, 2024, the European Commission fined Teva €462.6 million «over misuse of the patent system and disparagement to delay rival multiple sclerosis medicine», having attempted to obstacle other producers of glatiramer acetate both by abusing the patent system and by setting up a misinformation campaign targeting other glatiramer producers.
