= Common Terminology Criteria for Adverse Events =

Classification of medical adverse effects

The Common Terminology Criteria for Adverse Events (CTCAE; formerly called the Common Toxicity Criteria, CTC or NCI-CTC) are a set of criteria for standardized classification when recording adverse events of drugs and treatments (the definition includes "abnormal laboratory finding[s]"), each with an associated severity scale in the range 1—5. The system originated in oncology but is now also often used in clinical trials. The current version 6.0 is the first in spreadsheet (Excel) form, and the first to track changes from the previous version 5.0. It also continues to be available (the "Quick Reference" form) as a PDF document.

The classification of events uses the MedDRA at its granular (Lowest Level Terms: LLTs) level. For each term, specific conditions, findings and/or symptoms are stated for the different severity grades, which are organized as follows:

1 - Mild
2 - Moderate
3 - Severe
4 - Life-threatening
5 - Death if "related to the adverse event"

The guidelines used for grades 1—4 are stated in some detail, with their application to paediatric cases now clarified:

Grade 1 — mild; asymptomatic or mild symptoms; clinical or diagnostic observations only; or intervention not indicated.
Grade 2 — moderate; minimal, local or noninvasive intervention indicated; or limiting activities such as preparing meals, shopping for groceries or clothes, using the telephone, managing money etc. or (in pediatrics) mild/moderate impact on age-appropriate normal daily activity.
Grade 3 — severe or medically significant but not immediately life-threatening; hospitalization or prolongation of hospitalization indicated; disabling; or limiting activities such as bathing, dressing and undressing, feeding self, using the toilet, taking medications – but not bedridden – or (in pediatrics) severe impact on age-appropriate normal daily activity.
Grade 4 — life-threatening consequences; or urgent intervention indicated.

This system of criteria and severity grading originated in application to cancer therapy, as a product of the US National Cancer Institute (NCI). The first iteration was prior to 1998, with subsequent versions 2.0 released in 1999, 3.0 in 2003, 4.0 in 2009 and 5.0 in 2017.

== See also ==
- Adverse event – Any event, symptom, or disease occurring during a medical treatment
- Cancer research – Research into causes and treatment of cancer
- EudraVigilance
- Good clinical practice – International quality standard for drug testing and production
- National Cancer Institute – U.S. health institute
- Pharmacovigilance – Study of pharmaceutical drug safety
