= WHO Drug Dictionary =

Drug dictionary by WHO

The WHODrug Dictionary is an international classification of medicines created by the WHO Programme for International Drug Monitoring and managed by the Uppsala Monitoring Centre.

It is used by pharmaceutical companies, clinical trial organizations and drug regulatory authorities for identifying drug names in spontaneous ADR reporting (and pharmacovigilance) and in clinical trials. Created in 1968 and regularly updated, since 2005 there have been major developments in the form of a WHO Drug Dictionary Enhanced (with considerably more fields and data entries) and a WHO Herbal Dictionary, which covers traditional and herbal medicines. Since 2016 all of the WHODrug products have been available in a single subscription service called WHODrug Global.

Organization WHODrug drug code consist of 11 characters (alphanumeric code). It has 3 parts: Drug Record Number(Drug Rec No), Sequence number 1(Seq1) and Sequence number 2 (Seq2). Drug Rec No consists of 6 characters. It uniquely identifies active moieties, regardless of salt form or plant part and extract. Seq1 is used to uniquely identify different variations (e.g. salts and esters), plant parts and extraction methods, thereby defining active substances or a combination of active substances. WHODrug records sharing the same Drug Rec No and Seq1 contain the same variation/plant part/extract variation of the same active moiety. For single-ingredient records, Seq1=01 identifies a specific active moiety. If Seq1 is higher than 01 it refers to variations of that active moiety. For multi-ingredient records, Seq1=01 identifies a combination of active moieties. If Seq1 is higher than 01 it refers to variations of one or more of the active moieties in the combination. Finally, Seq2 uniquely identifies the name of the record in WHODrug.

Example The Drug Code for the substance Ibuprofen is 001092 01 001. The Drug Code for the trade name Advil infants pain & fever relief is 001092 01 A3D.

== Relationship to Anatomical Therapeutic Chemical Classification System ==
WHODrug records are classified with at least one code from Anatomical Therapeutic Chemical Classification System (including the HATC which stands for Herbal ATC and which is treated as part of ATC for mapping purposes). Preferably, a fourth level ATC code is assigned. ATC assignments in WHODrug are marked as 'official' or 'UMC-assigned'. Official ATC codes are classifications included in the official ATC index, while UMC-assigned ATC codes are classifications NOT included in the official ATC index.

In addition, a separate cross reference called "Cross Reference ATC 5". In this additional reference, WHODrug records are matched to fifth level ATC codes where applicable.

== Formats ==
WHODrug is offered in Four formats (called B3 and C3). B3 format is brief while C3 format contains additional columns on top of B3 format.

== Dictionary Versions ==
| WHODD 1 June 2006 | 1 June 2006 |
| WHODD 1 June 2007 | 1 June 2007 |

== Standardised Drug Groupings ==
WHODrug concepts can be organized into groups. Standardised Drug Groupings (SDGs) define groups of drugs. For example, diuretics, corticosteroids, drugs used in diabetes. Groups are also defined based on interaction, for example, drugs interacting with CYP2C8 or drugs interacting with UGT. R,Lee
