= Data entry =

Process of digitizing data

Data entry is the process of digitizing data by entering it into a computer system for organization and management purposes. It is a person-based process and is "one of the important basic" tasks needed when no machine-readable version of the information is readily available for planned computer-based analysis or processing.

Data entry is used in offices, research settings, schools, and businesses where a lot of information needs to be organized and entered accurately for easier analysis. Inputting data entry requires accuracy and consistency so that errors are minimized. An example of a digitized tool used for data entry are spreadsheet tools such as Microsoft Excel and Google Sheets. In short, data entry is the process of inputting data to keep it organized and make information usable within the digital system.

Sometimes, data entry can involve working with or creating "information about information [whose value] can be greater than the value of the information itself." It can also involve filling in required information which is then "data-entered" from what was written on the research document, such as the growth in available items in a category. This is a higher level of abstraction than metadata, "information about data".

== Procedures ==
Data entry is often done with a keyboard and at times also using a mouse, although a manually-fed scanner may be involved.

Historically, devices lacking any pre-processing capabilities were used.

=== Keypunching ===
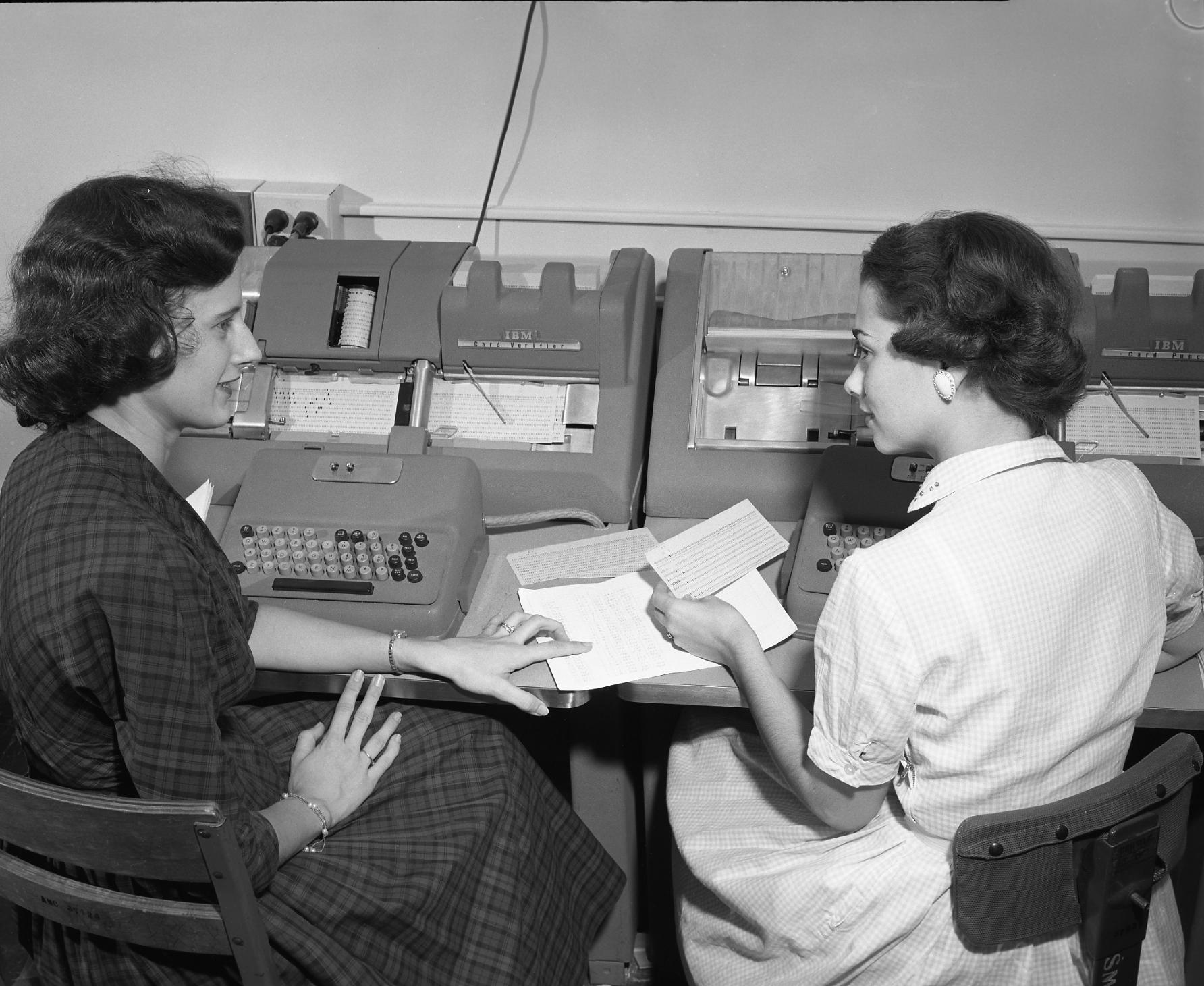
The woman at left is at an IBM 056 Card Verifier; to her right is a woman sitting at an IBM 026 Keypunch

Data entry using keypunches was related to the concept of batch processing – there was no immediate feedback.

=== Computer keyboards ===
Computer keyboards and online data-entry provide the ability to give feedback to the data entry clerk doing the work.

==== Numeric keypads ====
The addition of numeric keypads to computer keyboards introduced quicker and often also less error-prone entry of numeric data.

==== Computer mouse ====
The use of a computer mouse, typically on a personal computer, opened up another option for doing data entry.

=== Touch screens ===
Touch screens introduced even more options, including the ability to stand and do data entry, especially given "a proper height of work surface when performing data entry."

== Spreadsheets ==
Although most data entered into a computer are stored in a database, a significant amount is stored in a spreadsheet. The use of spreadsheets instead of databases for data entry can be traced to the 1979 introduction of Visicalc, and what some consider the wrong place for storing computational data continues.

Format control and specialized data validation are reasons that have been cited for using database-oriented data entry software.

== Data management ==
The search for assurance about the accuracy of the data entry process predates computer keyboards and online data entry. IBM even went beyond their 056 Card Verifier and developed their quieter IBM 059 model.

Modern techniques go beyond mere range checks, especially when the new data can be evaluated using probability about an event.

=== Assessment ===
In one study, a medical school tested its second year students and found their data entry skills – needed if they are to do small-scale unfunded research as part of their training – were below what the school considered acceptable, creating potential barriers.

=== Errors ===
Common errors in data entry include transposition errors, misclassified data, duplicate data, and omitted data, which are similar to bookkeeping errors. Electronic data interchange (EDI) can help to avoid data entry errors.

== See also ==
- Two pass verification
- Quality control
- Clinical data management
- Data verification
- Data entry clerk
- Input (computer science)
