= Hugo Stephenson =

Australian doctor

Hugo Stephenson (born 22 March 1974) is an Australian doctor, biotech services entrepreneur and founder of MediGuard, Health Research Solutions and MedSeed. Hugo is best known for his work promoting drug safety research and consumer health awareness.

== Entrepreneurial Activities ==
After graduating medicine from the University of Melbourne in 1997, Hugo started a PhD in clinical decision support at Monash University. He dropped out to start MedSeed, a clinical decision support software venture. MedSeed was acquired in 2000 by eHealthcare Asia - then a listed division of Quality HealthCare Asia Ltd.

== Drug Safety & MediGuard ==
Hugo founded Health Research Solutions (HRS) in 1999, a biotechnology services company that used the internet to manage the communication and data capture required for late phase clinical trials. HRS was able to use emerging internet technologies to conduct large observational studies and registries much faster and more cost-effectively, specializing in multinational late phase projects involving large patient numbers. These technologies also allowed HRS to conduct studies using doctors who had no research experience - helping researchers collect safety and outcomes data that more accurately reflected real world practice. Health Research Solutions was acquired by Quintiles in 2002, and Hugo relocated to Princeton, NJ to run Quintiles' global late phase businesses.

In 2004, Hugo wrote "Strategic Research: A Practical Handbook to Phase IIIB and IV studies". In 2005 Hugo became responsible for Quintiles' global late phase and drug safety operations. Hugo continued to support young internet start-ups during this period, advising companies such as AddThis prior to its acquisition by Clearspring in 2008. Through these experiences, Hugo became interested in consumers' growing use of the internet to access health information, and the potential to draw from models used by other industries to improve drug safety research and communications.

In 2007, with support from Quintiles, Hugo founded iGuard.org, an internet-enabled alert system that offered patients rapid alerts in the event one of their medications was the subject of a recall, or was found to have an interaction with another drug they were taking. In return for this service, patients would provide ongoing online feedback about drug effectiveness and side effects. iGuard was renamed MediGuard in 2010 as part of its international expansion to the United Kingdom, France, Germany and Australia. As of December 2011, MediGuard has more than 2.6M users, representing the largest patient driven data collection initiative in the world.

Hugo has been a guest medical expert on Good Morning Philadelphia, and was voted one of the "100 most inspiring people" by PharmaVoice Magazine in 2010.

== Education ==
- University of Melbourne, Bachelor of Medicine, Bachelor of Surgery
- University of Melbourne, Bachelor of Science (Physics)
