= Medical Products Agency (Sweden) =

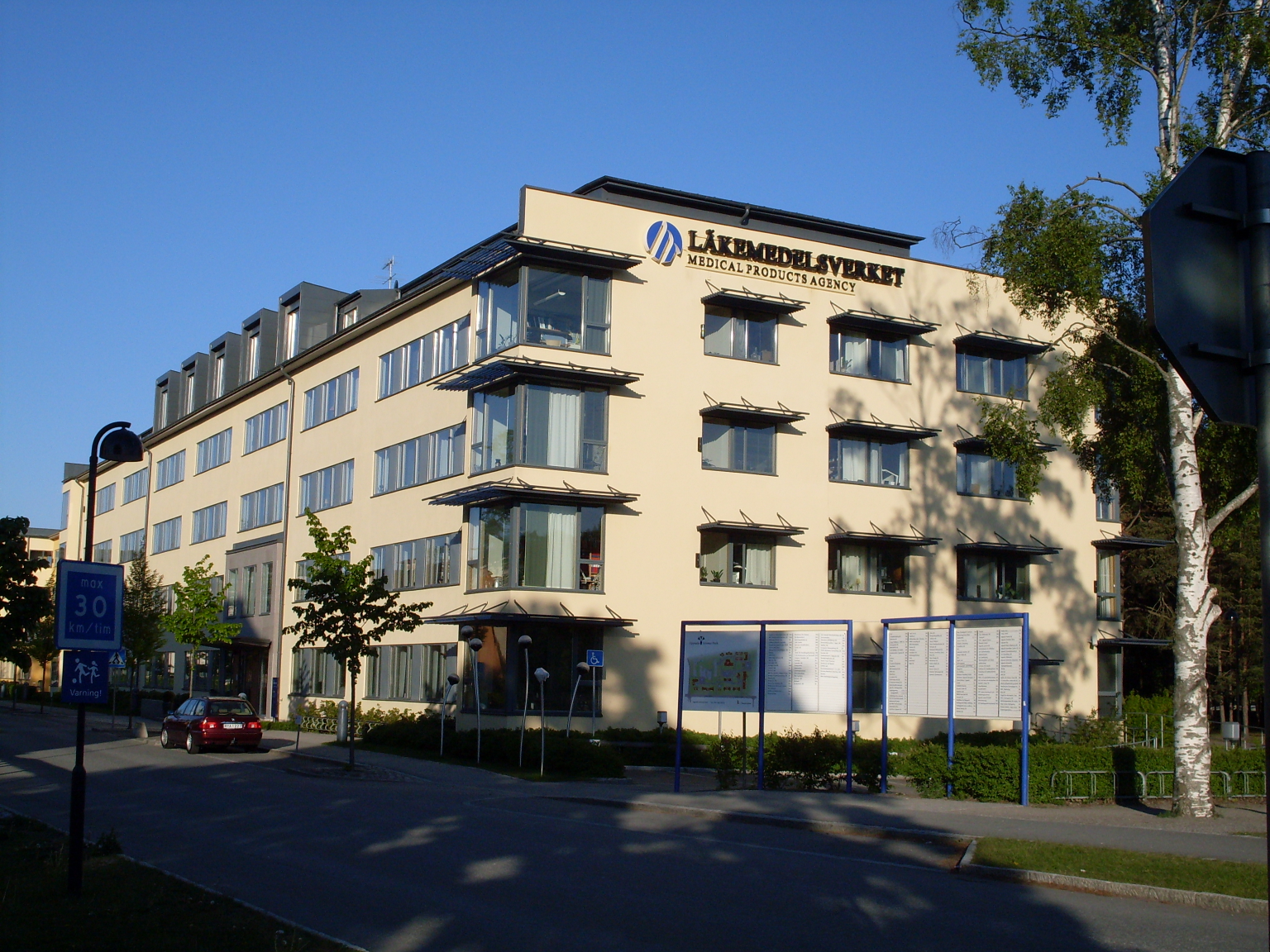
Medical Products Agency, headquarters in Uppsala

The Medical Products Agency (MPA; Swedish: Läkemedelsverket) is the government agency in Sweden responsible for regulation and surveillance of the development, manufacturing and sale of medicinal drugs, medical devices and cosmetics.

Its task is also to ensure that both patients and healthcare professionals have access to safe and effective medicinal products and that these are used in a rational and cost-effective manner.

The Swedish Medical Products Agency is one of the leading regulatory authorities in the EU. During the last five years, the Swedish MPA has been among the top three agencies in Europe, counting the number of approvals processes managed for central (i.e. European) approvals of medicines. The Swedish MPA also has strong representation in more than 110 working groups and committees in the scope of the Heads of Medicines Agencies (HMA) and European Medicines Agency (EMA) for regulation of medical products in Europe.

The Medical Products Agency is a government body under the aegis of the Swedish Ministry of Health and Social Affairs. Its operations are largely financed through fees. Approximately 750 people work at the agency; most are pharmacists and doctors.

== General directors ==
- 1990–1999: Kjell Strandberg
- 1999–2008: Gunnar Alván
- 2008–2014: Christina Rångemark Åkerman
- 2014–2020: Catarina Andersson Forsman
- 2020–2021: Joakim Brandberg (acting)
- 2021–2024: Björn Eriksson
- 2024–2025: Joakim Brandberg (acting)
- 2025–: Ann Lindberg

== Critics ==
In 2016, the Swedish National Audit Office published an audit report examining how the state (the government, the Medical Products Agency, the National Board of Health and Welfare and the Swedish Agency for Medical and Social Evaluation) handles the pharmaceutical industry's influence over state drug control and knowledge management. In its review, the National Audit Office sharply criticizes the Medical Products Agency for shortcomings on several points. However, the Medical Products Agency has pointed out that several of the conclusions were based on claims that lack objective support. The government also rejected large parts of the National Audit Office's criticism.

== See also ==
- European Medicines Agency
