= Qualified Person Responsible For Pharmacovigilance =

EU healthcare profession

In the European Union, the Qualified Person Responsible For Pharmacovigilance (QPPV) is an individual, usually an employee of a pharmaceutical company, who is personally responsible for the safety of the human pharmaceutical products marketed by that company in the EU. This function was established in 2004 by article 23 of regulation (EC) No 726/2004. The article establishes that the holder of a marketing authorization for a drug for human use must have a QPPV. When a company submits an application for permission to bring a medicinal product onto the market, the company submits a description of its system for monitoring the safety of the product in actual use (a pharmacovigilance system) and proof that the services of a QPPV are in place.

"The holder of an authorisation for a medicinal product for human use granted in accordance with the provisions of this Regulation shall have permanently and continuously at his disposal an appropriately qualified person responsible for pharmacovigilance."

== Responsibilities ==
Per Article 23, the QPPV is responsible for:

1. Establishing and maintaining a pharmacovigilance system
2. Preparing pharmacovigilance reports as defined by regulations
3. Answering requests from Health Authorities
4. Providing Health Authorities with any other information relevant to product safety

The Good Pharmacovigilance Practices (GVP) provide further guidance regarding these responsibilities of the QPPV (Module I, Section I.C.1.3: Role of the qualified person responsible for pharmacovigilance in the EU. Per GVP, the QPPV is responsible for the establishment and maintenance of the marketing authorisation holder's pharmacovigilance system and therefore shall have sufficient authority to influence the performance of the quality system and the pharmacovigilance activities and to promote, maintain and improve compliance with the legal requirements. The QPPV is specifically responsible for:

- Establishing and maintaining/managing the pharmaceutical company's pharmacovigilance system
- Having an overview of the safety profiles and any emerging safety concerns for the company's drugs
- Acting as a single contact point for the Health Authorities on a 24-hour basis

== Criteria for QPPV role ==
The QPPV must reside in the EU, and should be permanently and continuously at the disposal of the MAH. Each company (i.e. Applicant/Marketing Authorisation Holder or group of Marketing Authorisation Holders using a common pharmacovigilance system) should appoint one QPPV responsible for overall pharmacovigilance for all medicinal products for which the company holds marketing authorisations within the EU.

Detailed information on the role and responsibilities of the QPPV, and guidance for a Marketing Authorisation Holder on how to adequately support the QPPV are specified in Guideline on good pharmacovigilance practices (GVP; Module I – Pharmacovigilance systems and their quality systems)." At a minimum the QPPV should be appropriately qualified, with documented experience in all aspects of pharmacovigilance in order to fulfil the responsibilities and tasks of the post. If the QPPV is not medically qualified, access to a medically qualified person should be available.

In addition, there are national regulations in some EU member states that also require a nominated individual in that country who has specific legal obligations as a QPPV at a national level.

== See also ==
- Pharmacovigilance
- European Medicines Agency
