= Clinical quality management system =

Clinical quality management systems (CQMS) are systems used in the life sciences sector (primarily in the pharmaceutical, biologics and medical device industries) designed to manage quality management best practices throughout clinical research and clinical study management. A CQMS system is designed to manage all of the documents, activities, tasks, processes, quality events, relationships, audits and training that must be administered and controlled throughout the life of a clinical trial. The premise of a CQMS is to bring together the activities led by two sectors of clinical research, Clinical Quality and Clinical Operations, to facilitate cross-functional activities to improve efficiencies and transparency and to encourage the use of risk mitigation and risk management practices at the clinical study level.

Based on the principles of quality management systems (QMS) which are used in many industries to create a framework for defining and delivering quality outcomes, managing risk, and continual improvement. Many guidelines and governance bodies have been established to ensure a common approach within a given industry to a set of parameters used to identify the minimally acceptable standard for that industry. The pharmaceutical industry is no exception, with several trade groups (e.g. PhRMA, EFPIA, RQA, etc.) coming together to enhance collaboration. However, as noted by the Academy of Medical Sciences, there are increasingly complex and bureaucratic legal and ethical frameworks that innovators must work within to develop new medicines for patients.

The historical pharmaceutical QMS applies primarily to good manufacturing practice as described in existing ISO (International Organization for Standardization) and ICH (International Committee on Harmonization) guidelines. "Good Manufacturing Practices (GMP) relate to quality control and quality assurance enabling companies in the pharmaceutical sector to minimize or eliminate instances of contamination, mix-ups, and errors. This in turn, protects the customer from purchasing a product which is ineffective or even dangerous."

These standards have historically been applied to the manufacturing environment, appropriate to how they have been written. However, according to FDA as well as other regulatory bodies, "Implementation of ICH Q10 throughout the product lifecycle should facilitate innovation and continual improvement", implying that the same standards that apply to the manufacturing environment should also be applied to the clinical research space, earlier in the lifecycle of an investigational or marketed product. Accordingly, a CQMS is any system developed to apply these principles to clinical operations within an organization.
