= WHOART =

Medical dictionary

The WHO Adverse Reactions Terminology (WHOART) was a dictionary meant to serve as a basis for rational coding of adverse reaction terms. The system was maintained by the Uppsala Monitoring Centre (UMC), the World Health Organization Collaborating Centre for International Drug Monitoring. The system is no longer actively maintained since 2015.

== Structure ==
- 32 System-organ classesbody organ groups
- 180 High level terms for grouping Preferred terms
- 2085 Preferred terms principal terms for describing adverse reactions
- 3445 Included terms synonyms to Preferred terms

== See also ==
- Pharmacovigilance
- COSTART
- MedDRA
- Adverse event
