= Uppsala Monitoring Centre =

Medical research centre in Sweden

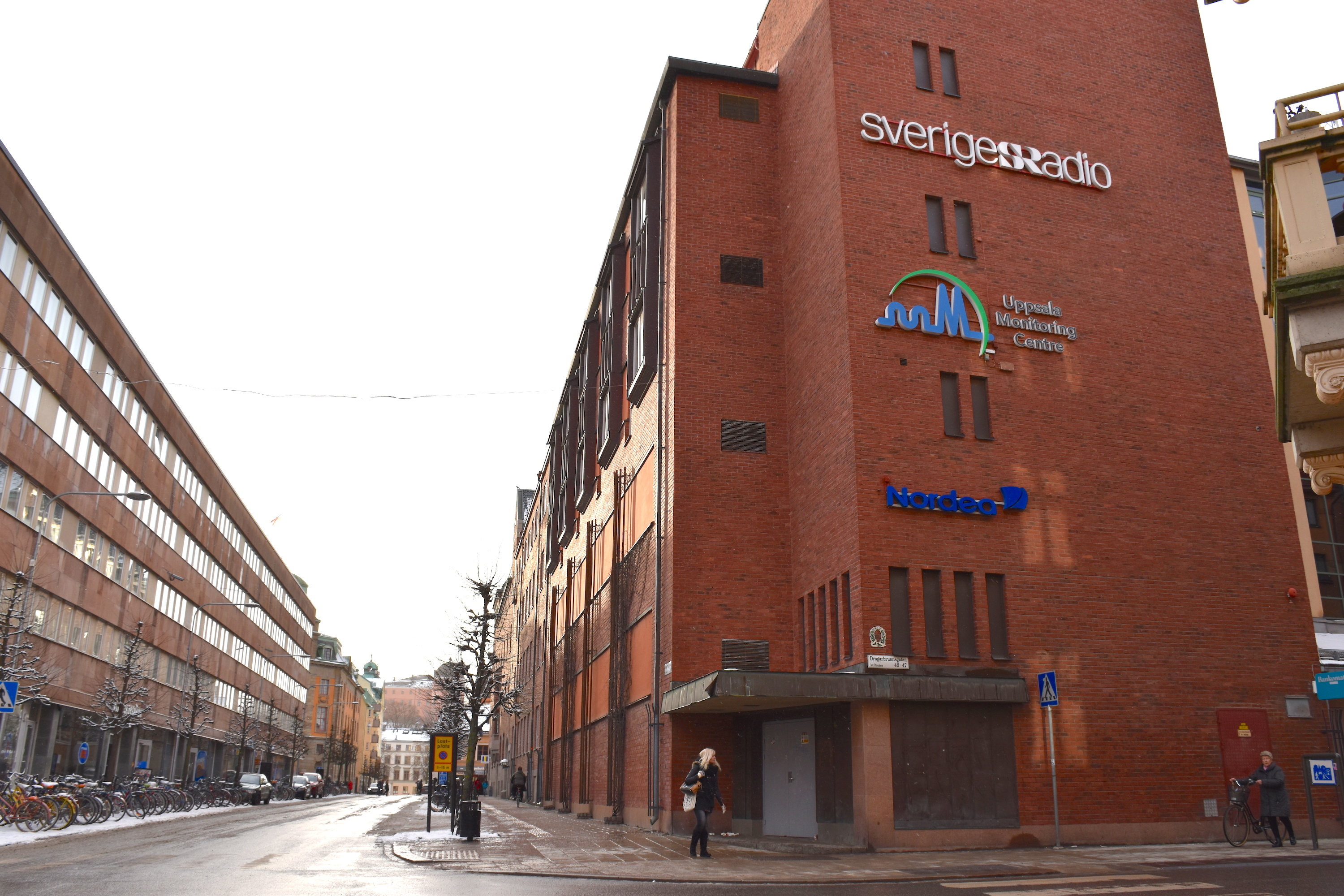
Uppsala Monitoring Centre's logo as seen on the facade of its office building in Uppsala, Sweden.

Uppsala Monitoring Centre (UMC) is a non-profit foundation working for the safer use of medicines and vaccines. Located in Uppsala, Sweden, UMC is the designated World Health Organization Collaborating Centre for International Drug Monitoring. UMC works by collecting, assessing and communicating information from member countries' national pharmacovigilance centres in regard to the risks of medicines and vaccines.

== Background ==
Since 1978, responsibility for managing the WHO Programme for International Drug Monitoring has been carried by UMC. In the early years the staff consisted of just three pharmacists, Sten Olsson, Cecilia Biriell and Marie Lindquist, based at the Swedish Medical Products Agency (Läkemedelsverket); Currently over 150 staff work in central Uppsala. The founding chairman and acting Director was Professor Åke Liljestrand. From 1990 to 2009 the Director was Professor Ralph Edwards. In 2009, Dr. Marie Lindquist became the Director until her retirement in 2020. Hervé Le Louët served from 2021 to 2022 and was succeeded by Peter Hjelmström. The Head of Research is Dr. Niklas Norén.

The work of the UMC is:

- To co-ordinate the WHO Programme for International Drug Monitoring and its more than 150 member countries.
- To collect, assess and communicate information from member countries about the risks of drugs and other substances used in medicine to improve patient therapy and public health worldwide.
- To collaborate with member countries in the development and practice of the science of pharmacovigilance.

The main focus and source of data in pharmacovigilance are reports of ICSRs (individual case safety reports) from healthcare providers and patients in member countries of the WHO Programme. A WHO global individual case safety report database (VigiBase) is maintained and developed on behalf of the WHO by UMC. UMC develops and provides several tools and classifications for use by organisations involved in drug safety, including the WHO Drug Dictionary – with a bridge to the MedDRA terminology and WHO ICD – tools for searching in the database, and a program for case report management, VigiFlow.

UMC's research covers mainly three areas: data-driven discovery (especially statistical techniques), dis-proportionality analyses, interaction detection, patterns and duplicate case detection, safety surveillance and signaling (among which drug dependence and pediatric use) and benefit—risk analysis. As of 2023 over 200 scientific articles in peer-reviewed journals were linked on the centre's website.

UMC has been active in initiatives to improve communication in areas related to medicines safety since 1996. The centre has been active in presenting research in the medical literature which has included some seminal works in the field. The Uppsala centre has also published books in the field of drugs safety including a regular newsletter. In 2010 the 2nd edition of a crisis management guide was published, entitled 'Expecting the Worst', also translated into other languages.

UMC's role in drug safety has not been without controversy for both medicines agencies and pharmaceutical companies, despite an open approach willing to engage with many parties in the pharmaceutical world. They are closely involved in outreach to developing countries and other areas where pharmacovigilance is not yet handled.

== See also ==
- International Conference on Harmonisation of Technical Requirements for Registration of Pharmaceuticals for Human Use (ICH)
- Council for International Organizations of Medical Sciences (CIOMS)
- International Society of Pharmacovigilance
- EudraVigilance (EEA)
- Yellow Card Scheme (UK)
- Clinical trial
- Drug development
- MedDRA
