= Clinical trial management system =

Software system

A Clinical Trial Management System (CTMS) is a software system used by biotechnology and pharmaceutical industries to manage clinical trials in clinical research. The system maintains and manages planning, performing and reporting functions, along with participant contact information, tracking deadlines and milestones.

== Terminology ==
eClinical is a term used within the biopharmaceutical industry to refer to trial automation technology. Originally, "eClinical" was used to refer to any involved technology. Without a more specific definition, the industry used "eClinical" to name technologies such as electronic data capture, clinical trial management systems or Randomization and Trial Supply Management systems, commonly using Interactive voice response systems, electronic patient diaries and other applications.

More recently, the term evolved to encompass the entire "business process" instead of individual technologies. An example of an "eClinical solution" is the combination of EDC and IVR systems where common data are shared in a way that eliminates the need for users to enter the same data or perform the same action in both applications. The shift in the definition of "eClinical" has been a natural part of the industry’s evolution to seek better ways to utilize multiple technologies together within a clinical trial.

== Background ==
While individual solutions have helped to automate or streamline particular application areas, maintaining multiple systems containing overlapping data and functionality brought significant inefficiencies. The industry found that eliminating data discrepancies between systems has reduced data reconciliation activities and helped ensure that those responsible for a clinical trial always has accurate and up-to-date information. As the number of relevant applications increases with greater adoption of EDC and other technologies, the problems of duplication of data and redundancy in process have increased. As a consequence, the pursuit of an integrated technology suite to streamline workflows and improve usability has become a key characteristic of the industry’s latest "eClinical" approach. Furthermore, It improves productivity by reducing the need for internal staff to input data.

== Purpose ==
Often, a clinical trial management system provides data to a business intelligence system, which acts as a digital dashboard for trial managers. Clinical Trial Management System's allow experts easily to access centralized data and thus reducing the number of delayed trials. Sponsors can work with a database of previously researched contacts and names of volunteers who are suitable for participating in a given trial. Clinical trial management systems are cost- and time-effective, as they also can be used for gathering and organizing information that can be shared to different care providers and distributed across different systems. These systems can facilitate site identification and recruitment and they can provide control and tracking over subject enrolment and subjects’ database.

== Functions and configurations ==
In the early phases of clinical trials, when the number of patients and tests are small, in-house or home-grown programs are typically used to handle their data. In later phases, data volumes and complexity grow, motivating many organizations to adopt more comprehensive software. Available software includes budgeting, patient management, compliance with government regulations, project management, financials, patient management and recruitment, investigator management, regulatory compliance and compatibility with other systems such as electronic data capture and adverse event reporting systems.

The key areas served by CTMS include trial planning and setup, site & investigator management, participant management, scheduling and workflow automation, regulatory compliance and document management, financial tracking & budgeting, monitoring & reporting, etc.

In addition to pharmaceutical and biotechnology industries, CTMSs are widely used at sites where clinical research is conducted such as research hospitals, physician practices, academic medical centers and cancer centers.

While pharmaceutical companies that sponsor clinical trials may provide a CTMS to the sites that participate in their trials, sites may operate a CTMS to support day-to-day operations in areas such as conducting study feasibility, streamlining the workflow of the trial coordinators and investigators, providing a centralized place to house all trial-related information, and improve clinical data management by equipping staff, including biostatisticians and database administrators.

Some CTMS are cloud based and are delivered in a software as a service (SaaS) modality, while others require dedicated servers.
