= Research on Adverse Drug Events and Reports =

Research on Adverse Drug Events and Reports (RADAR) is a pharmacovigilance team of 25 doctors who receive calls about possible adverse drug reactions (ADR) and investigate. RADAR is based at Northwestern's Feinberg School of Medicine. RADAR is led by Dennis West. Though it was without funding for its first four years, RADAR has raised about $12 million through grants from the National Institutes of Health, the American Cancer Society and other such institutions. Its work has identified safety problems with 33 drugs. Adverse drug events are a serious health problem.

== Aims ==
The aims of RADAR are to disseminate safety reports for serious adverse drug reactions (sADRs) and to identify barriers to identification and reporting of these clinical events. Investigators have developed a well-coordinated system to accurately compile case report information on sADRs and to identify milestones associated with identification and reporting of the relevant ADR information. This ADR identification system allows us to amass pertinent sADR information from a diverse set of data sources in order to identify and report sADRs in a timely and thorough manner. With increasingly shortened review periods, postmarketing surveillance for sADRs has become very important. In some instances, initial cases are identified at hospital case conferences and reported to the U.S. Food and Drug Administration (FDA) or to the pharmaceutical manufacturer. The RADAR methodology relies on initial recognition of these “sentinel” cases that then prompts hypothesis–driven inquiries as to whether an unrecognized adverse drug event signal is present in the population of those exposed to that drug.

== Results ==
Between 1998 and 2007, 33 serious adverse drug or device reactions have been reported by RADAR investigators. The toxicities involved multiple biological system and included thrombotic thrombocytopenic purpura (TTP) (ticlopidine and clopidogrel), thromboembolism (thalidomide and lenalidomide), liver failure (gemtuzumab and nevirapine), hypersensitivity (drug eluting coronary arterial stents), pure red-cell aplasia (PRCA) (epoetin), vision changes (amiodarone, sildenafil, and tadalafil), late thrombotic events (drug eluting cardiac stents), leukemia (G-CSF), and interstitial pneumonitis (gemcitabine). For each individual ADR, the number of unique event reports collected by RADAR ranged from 0 to 96. Twenty-seven sADRs were associated with drugs and four were associated with a device.

== Methods ==
The success of the RADAR program has previously been largely based on the use of diverse data sources to identify, clarify, and verify ADRs. Databases, registries, clinical trials, referral centers, and case reports have all been utilized as sites of detection. In particular, RADAR has made use of reports submitted to MedWatch as well as more focused databases such as the Medicare-SEER database. Hypothesis-driven active surveillance of a few hundred safety reports serves as the underlying conceptual framework of RADAR pharmacovigilance. Fewer than 20 individual ADR reports led to RADAR investigators identifying safety signals for the majority of the ADRs described to date. Despite a small number of reports for each ADR, causality assessments have been supported by pathology studies, antibody studies, and autopsies. For example, the initial description of thrombotic thrombocytopenic purpura associated with clopidogrel included only 11 cases.

== Strengths ==
RADAR has also identified key barriers to timely and efficiently identifying ADRs and to comprehensively reporting these findings. In particular, we identified quality concerns with MedWatch reports (the FDA's primary source of adverse event reports) and poor quality of dissemination of adverse event findings from the FDA and the pharmaceutical sponsor. Our efforts have found that RADAR sADR identification and dissemination efforts can be as rapid as one to two years after FDA approval, in contrast to the seven years generally seen with safety efforts from the FDA and pharmaceutical sponsors. Thus, the RADAR project has developed into an important adjunct to the current pharmaceutical drug and device safety system.

== Specific ADR reports by RADAR ==
RADAR has analyzed historical data on many drugs from their initial inception, through approval by the FDA, and to the present. These analyses synthesize the various sources of statistical information on the presence of adverse reactions to these drugs and assess whether the actual risk is in line with studies.
