= Natco Pharma =

Indian pharmaceutical company

- Type: Public
- Traded as: NSE: NATCOPHARM; BSE: 524816
- Industry: Pharmaceuticals
- Founded: 1981
- Founder: VC Nannapaneni
- Headquarters: Hyderabad, Telangana, India
- Number of locations: 50 countries
- Area served: Global
- Key people: VC Nannapaneni (Chairman and MD); Rajeev Nannapaneni (CEO and Vice Chairman)
- Revenue: ▲₹4,375 crore (US$450 million) (2026)
- Operating income: ▲₹2,054 crore (US$210 million) (2026)
- Net income: ▲₹1,418 crore (US$150 million) (2026)
- Number of employees: 5,200
- Website: natcopharma.co.in
- Footnotes; Financials as of 31 May 2026.

Natco Pharma is an Indian multinational pharmaceutical company based in Hyderabad. The company manufactures finished dosage formulations, active pharmaceutical ingredients and agrochemical products. It is a major producer of branded oncology medicines cardiology, diabetology and other pharma specialty drugs at affordable prices.

== History ==
Natco Pharma was founded in 1981 by V C Nannapaneni. In 1983, operations commenced at manufacturing facility at Kothur. In 1986 NATCO established a manufacturing facility at Nagarjuna Sagar, Andhra Pradesh. NATCO Pharma went public on 1st July 1992. In 1993, the company's chemical division started at Mekaguda near Hyderabad.

In 2003, the oncology division was launched with the flagship brand VEENAT (generic Imatinib Mesylate) for treating chronic myelogenous leukemia. In 2008, Natco Pharma filed its first paragraph IV filing in the US with the USFDA, In 2012, Natco Pharma obtained compulsory license to produce a cheaper and generic version of Bayer's anti-cancer medication Nexavar. In the United States, it launched influenza medication Tamiflu with marketing partner Alvogen, multiple sclerosis treatment drug glatiramer acetate in partnership with Mylan, and hepatitis C drugs under a licensing agreement with Gilead Sciences.

In 2016, Natco Pharma launched the first Tamiflu capsule in the US market. In 2017, Natco Pharma launched a generic version of blood cancer drug Pomalidomide in the United States. In 2019, Natco Pharma initiated work on green-field manufacturing facilities for producing niche agrichemical products in Nellore district, Andhra Pradesh.

In 2025, Natco Pharma completed the acquisition of a 35.75% stake in Adcock Ingram, a South African pharmaceutical company, for approximately US$226 million. The acquisition resulted in the delisting of Adcock Ingram from the Johannesburg Stock Exchange.

Hyderabad-based Natco Pharma Limited on Tuesday completed the acquisition of an additional 13.25 per cent equity stake in South African pharmaceutical company Adcock Ingram Holdings Proprietary Limited, bringing its total shareholding to 49 per cent.

Export Formulations

Has over three decades of expertise in targeting niche and complex molecules. Business spans across key regulated markets including US, Canada, Brazil, Indonesia, Singapore, LATAM, MENA countries.
