= PRRS =

PRRS can refer to:

- Porcine reproductive and respiratory syndrome, a disease of pigs
- Radical Socialist Republican Party, a former Spanish political party

== See also ==
- PRR (disambiguation)
