= Boston Collaborative Drug Surveillance Program =

The Boston Collaborative Drug Surveillance Program (BCDSP), established in 1966, was a pioneer in the field of drug epidemiology, pharmacoepidemiology . Still active, the group has published over 400 articles and reviews in peer-reviewed journals. The group uses large patient databases, in particular the UK Clinical Practice Research Datalink (CPRD), formerly the General Practice Research Database (GPRD), to evaluate and quantify the potential adverse effects of prescription drugs.

== See also ==
- Pharmacovigilance
