= Yellow Card Scheme =

Pharmacovigilance system in the United Kingdom

The Yellow Card Scheme is a United Kingdom voluntary system for collecting information on suspected or observed adverse drug reactions (ADRs) to medicines, vaccines, medical devices, blood products, and e-cigarettes. The scheme aims to monitor the safety of medical products that are marketed in the UK.

== History ==
The scheme was founded in 1964 after the thalidomide disaster, and was developed by Bill Inman. It is run by the Medicines and Healthcare products Regulatory Agency (MHRA) and the Commission on Human Medicines. It was extended to hospital pharmacists in 1997, and to community pharmacists in 1999.

The Yellow Card Centre Scotland is a joint venture between MHRA and the Scottish Government.

== Scope ==
Suspected adverse reactions are collected on all medicines, whether issued on prescription, bought over the counter from a pharmacist or supermarket, or acquired illegitimately. This includes cases of misuse, overdose and medication errors. The scheme also covers all herbal preparations, complementary or alternative medicines, unlicensed medicines, vaccines, radiographic contrast media and blood products. Additionally, reports can be made for counterfeit or defective medicines or medical devices, and e-cigarettes.

Adverse reactions can be reported by anyone. This includes healthcare professionals such as doctors, pharmacists and nurses, as well as patients and caregivers. Any duplicate reports are merged by the MHRA.

Any adverse reaction can be reported through the Yellow Card scheme, but of particular importance are:

- Those that have caused death, permanent harm or hospitalisation
- Those associated with a new medicine or one that is under continued monitoring (highlighted in the British National Formulary with a ▼ black triangle), however minor
- Those, however minor, which occurred in a child (under 18 years of age), the elderly (65 years of age or greater), or during pregnancy
- Those associated with biological/biosimilar medicines and vaccines

There is no need to report well-established, minor side-effects to medicines (unless in one of the populations mentioned above).

A list of current black triangle medicines is available on the European Medicines Agency website.

== Usage ==
Reports can be entered through the MHRA's website, or a smartphone app which is available for iOS and Android devices. The app can also provide news and alerts to users.

Yellow Cards are available from pharmacies and a few are presented near the back of the BNF as tear-off pages; copies may also be obtained by telephoning +44 (0) 808 100 3352. The scheme provides forms that allow members of the public to report suspected side effects, as well as health professionals. Children and young people can also report suspected adverse drug reactions to the Yellow Card scheme, and specific information for them has been developed and tested. Statutory guidance requires Yellow Card reporting to be incorporated into schools' relationships and sexual health practice from September 2026.

NHS Digital publishes an information standard DCB1582 for electronic submission of adverse reactions by IT systems (until 2014, this was ISB 1582 from the Information Standards Board). The specification is based on the ICH E2B (R2) international standard format.

== See also ==
- EudraVigilance (European Medicines Agency)
- Pharmacovigilance
- Uppsala Monitoring Centre (World Health Organization)
- Vaccine Adverse Event Reporting System (USA)
- VigiBase (WHO)
