= Proportional reporting ratio =

The proportional reporting ratio (PRR) is a statistic that is used to summarize the extent to which a particular adverse event is reported for individuals taking a specific drug, compared to the frequency at which the same adverse event is reported for patients taking some other drug (or who are taking any drug in a specified class of drugs). The PRR will typically be calculated using a surveillance database in which reports of adverse events from a variety of drugs are recorded.

A PRR greater than 1 suggests that the adverse event is more commonly reported for individuals taking the drug of interest, relative to the comparison drugs. This could indicate that the adverse event is caused by the drug of interest and therefore a "side effect", although a PRR exceeding 1 could also reflect sampling variation in the data, reporting errors, biased reporting, multiple reports of the same case or the same patient, or a number of other causes.

The PRR is defined as the ratio between the frequency with which a specific adverse event is reported for the drug of interest (relative to all adverse events reported for the drug) and the frequency with which the same adverse event is reported for all drugs in the comparison group (relative to all adverse events for drugs in the comparison group). For example, suppose that nausea was reported 83 times for a given drug of interest, out of 1356 adverse events reported for the drug. Thus the proportion of adverse events of nausea for this drug is 83/1356 = 0.061. Suppose that we wish to compare the drug of interest to a class of drugs, for which nausea was reported as an adverse event 1489 times, out of 53789 total adverse events reported for drugs in the class. Thus, nausea was reported with proportion 1489 / 53789 = 0.028 for the class of drugs. The PRR in this case is 0.061 / 0.028 = 2.18. This tells us that nausea was reported more than twice as frequently (among all adverse event reports) for the drug of interest compared to drugs in the comparison group.

== See also ==
- Pharmacovigilance
- Odds ratio
