= Clinical research =

Medical research using human test subjects

Clinical research is a branch of medical research that involves people and aims to determine the effectiveness (efficacy) and safety of medications, devices, diagnostic products, and treatment regimens intended for improving human health. These research procedures are designed for the prevention, treatment, diagnosis or understanding of disease symptoms.

Clinical research is different from clinical practice: in clinical practice, established treatments are used to improve the condition of a person, while in clinical research, evidence is collected under rigorous study conditions on groups of people to determine the efficacy and safety of a treatment.

== Description ==
The term "clinical research" refers to the entire process of studying and writing about a drug, a medical device or a form of treatment, which includes conducting interventional studies (clinical trials) or observational studies on human participants. Clinical research can cover any medical method or product from its inception in the lab to its introduction to the consumer market and beyond. Once the promising candidate or the molecule is identified in the lab, it is subjected to pre-clinical studies or animal studies where different aspects of the test article (including its safety toxicity if applicable and efficacy, if possible at this early stage) are studied.

The clinical research ecosystem involves a complex network of sites, pharmaceutical companies and academic research institutions. Clinical research is often conducted at academic medical centers and affiliated research study sites. These centers and sites provide the prestige of the academic institution as well as access to larger metropolitan areas, providing a larger pool of medical participants. These academic medical centers often have their internal Institutional Review Boards that oversee the ethical conduct of medical research.

=== Patient and public involvement ===
Besides being participants in a clinical trial, members of the public can actively collaborate with researchers in designing and conducting clinical research. This is known as patient and public involvement (PPI). Public involvement involves a working partnership between patients, caregivers, people with lived experience, and researchers to shape and influence what is researched and how. PPI can improve the quality of research and make it more relevant and accessible. People with current or past experience of illness can provide a different perspective than professionals and complement their knowledge. Through their personal knowledge they can identify research topics that are relevant and important to those living with an illness or using a service. They can also help to make the research more grounded in the needs of the specific communities they are part of. Public contributors can also ensure that the research is presented in plain language that is clear to the wider society and the specific groups it is most relevant for.

== Phases ==
Following preclinical research, clinical trials involving new drugs are commonly classified into four phases. Each phase of the drug approval process is treated as a separate clinical trial. If the drug successfully passes through Phases I, II, and III, it will be approved by the national regulatory authority for use in the general population. Phase IV research monitors side effects of a new treatment after it is approved for marketing and in wide clinical use.

Phase I includes 20 to 100 healthy volunteers or individuals with the disease or condition. This study typically lasts several months and its purpose is to prove safety and an effective dosage. Phase II includes a larger number of individual participants in the range of 100–300, and Phase III includes some 1000-3000 participants to assess efficacy and safety of the drug at different doses. Only 25-30% of drugs advance to the end of Phase III. Phase IV clinical research is conducted after a drug or treatment has received regulatory approval and is available on the market.

== Clinical research by country ==
=== United States ===
In the United States, when a test article is unapproved or not yet cleared by the Food and Drug Administration (FDA), or when an approved or cleared test article is used in a way that may significantly increase the risks (or decreases the acceptability of the risks), the data obtained from the preclinical studies or other supporting evidence, or case studies of off label use are submitted to the FDA in support of an Investigational New Drug application.

Where devices are concerned the submission to the FDA would be for an Investigational Device Exemption application if the device is a significant risk device or is not in some way exempt from prior submission to the FDA. In addition, clinical research may require Institutional Review Board or Research Ethics Board and possibly other institutional committee reviews, Privacy Board, Conflict of Interest Committee, Radiation Safety Committee or Radioactive Drug Research Committee.

=== European Union ===
In the European Union, the European Medicines Agency acts in a similar fashion for studies conducted in their region. These human studies are conducted in four phases in research subjects that give consent to participate in the clinical trials.

== See also ==
- Clinical research associate
- Clinical research ethics
- Clinical trial management system
- Randomized controlled trial
- Evidence-based medicine
- Unethical human experimentation
