= COSTART =

Medical dictionary

The Coding Symbols for a Thesaurus of Adverse Reaction Terms (COSTART) was developed by the United States Food and Drug Administration (FDA) for the coding, filing and retrieving of post-marketing adverse reaction reports. COSTART provides a method to deal with the variation in vocabulary used by those who submit adverse event reports to the FDA. Use of this dictionary allowed for standardization of adverse reaction reporting to the FDA in a consistent way.

COSTART was last updated in 1999. It has been replaced by the Medical Dictionary for Regulatory Activities, MedDRA.

== See also ==
- Pharmacovigilance
- WHOART
- Adverse event
