= MedDRA =

International medical terminology dictionary-thesaurus

A subscription-based product of the International Council for Harmonisation of Technical Requirements for Pharmaceuticals for Human Use (ICH), MedDRA or Medical Dictionary for Regulatory Activities is a clinically validated international medical terminology dictionary-thesaurus used by regulatory authorities and the biopharmaceutical industry during the regulatory process, from pre-marketing (clinical research phase 0 to phase 3) to post-marketing activities (pharmacovigilance or clinical research phase 4), and for safety information data entry, retrieval, evaluation, and presentation. It is also the adverse event classification dictionary.

The first version of MedDRA was released in 1999 in English and Japanese.

MedDRA is now translated into Chinese, Czech, Dutch, French, German, Hungarian, Italian, Korean, Portuguese, Brazilian Portuguese, Russian, and Spanish. In MedDRA version 25.0, Swedish and Latvian translations were also added.

In many countries/regions the use of MedDRA by biopharmaceutical companies is mandated for safety reporting. Many other industries, including tobacco and cosmetics, are beginning to use MedDRA for capturing adverse health events.

All Regulatory Members of ICH are expected to implement MedDRA within 5 years.

As of 2020, the following ICH Regulatory Members have implemented MedDRA: EC, Europe; FDA, United States; HSA, Singapore; Health Canada, Canada; MHLW/PMDA, Japan; Swissmedic, Switzerland; and TFDA, Taiwan.

Information about the implementation status of MedDRA by ICH Regulatory Members is updated by ICH on its website.

MedDRA is used internationally, with close to 7,500 subscribing organizations in almost 130 countries. Each organization requires only one subscription to MedDRA.

== MedDRA vision ==
In developing and maintaining MedDRA, ICH endeavours to facilitate the exchange of clinical information through standardized international medical terminology that can be used for regulatory communication and evaluation of data pertaining to medicinal products for human use. MedDRA is designed for use in the registration, documentation, and safety monitoring of medicinal products through all phases of the development life cycle. The single standardized terminology offers several advantages for regulators, industry, and other stakeholders:

- Removal of the need to convert data from one terminology to another, preventing the loss and/or distortion of data and allowing savings in resources
- Improvements in the ease and timeliness of data available for effective analysis, exchange, and decision making
- Consistency of the terminology throughout the different stages of the development of a medicinal product allowing effective cross-references and analysis of data
- Facilitation of the electronic exchange of data relating to medicinal products

== Organization of the dictionary ==
The MedDRA dictionary is organized with a five-level hierarchy. The highest or broadest level is System Organ Class (SOC), further divided into High-Level Group Terms (HLGT), High-Level Terms (HLT), Preferred Terms (PT), and finally into the most granular Lowest Level Terms (LLT). In addition, the MedDRA dictionary includes Standardized MedDRA Queries (SMQs). SMQs are groupings of terms that relate to a defined medical condition or area of interest.

SMQs are developed to facilitate retrieval of MedDRA-coded data as a first step in investigating drug safety issues in pharmacovigilance and clinical development.

As of MedDRA 25.1, 110 SMQs have been created comprising 120 lower-level SMQs. Additional SMQs are created as the need arises.

Individual cases are usually coded for data entry at the most specific (LLT) level, and outputs of counts or cases are usually provided at the PT level. The higher levels (HLT, HLGT, and SOC), as well as SMQs, are used for searching and for organizing and subtotalling outputs.

== MedDRA hierarchy ==
The five-level hierarchy provides degrees or levels of super-ordination and subordination. The superordinate term is a broad grouping term applicable to each subordinate descriptor linked to it. Hierarchical levels thus represent vertical links in the terminology.

Hierarchies are an important mechanism for flexible data retrieval and for the clear presentation of data. The five-level structure of this terminology provides options for retrieving data by specific or broad groupings, according to the level of specificity required. The Lowest Level Term (LLT) level provides maximum specificity.

The terminology was not developed as a formal classification or taxonomy; each level in the hierarchy may reflect a variable degree of specificity or “granularity” from one System Organ Class to another. High-Level Terms (HLTs) and High-Level Group Terms (HLGTs) facilitate data retrieval and presentation by providing clinically relevant grouping of terms. Collectively, the HLT and HLGT levels are sometimes referred to as the “grouping terms” in MedDRA.

The 27 System Organ Classes (SOCs) represent parallel axes that are not mutually exclusive. This characteristic, called “multi-axiality,” allows a term to be represented in more than one SOC and to be grouped by different classifications (e.g., by etiology or manifestation site), allowing retrieval and presentation via different data sets. Grouping terms are pre-defined in the terminology and not selected on an ad hoc basis by data entry staff. Rather, the terminology is structured so that selection of a data entry term leads to the automatic assignment of grouping terms higher in the hierarchy. Multi-axial links of terms are pre-assigned in MedDRA, ensuring comprehensive and consistent data retrieval, irrespective of which SOC is selected at data retrieval.

As of MedDRA 28.1 (September 2025):

- SOC – 27
  - The 27 SOCs are: Blood and lymphatic system disorders; Cardiac disorders; Congenital, familial and genetic disorders; Ear and labyrinth disorders; Endocrine disorders; Eye disorders; Gastrointestinal disorders; General disorders and administration site conditions; Hepatobiliary disorders; Immune system disorders; Infections and infestations; Injury, poisoning and procedural complications; Investigations; Metabolism and nutrition disorders; Musculoskeletal and connective tissue disorders; Neoplasms benign, malignant and unspecified (incl cysts and polyps); Nervous system disorders; Pregnancy, puerperium and perinatal conditions; Product issues; Psychiatric disorders; Renal and urinary disorders; Reproductive system and breast disorders; Respiratory, thoracic and mediastinal disorders; Skin and subcutaneous tissue disorders; Social circumstances; Surgical and medical procedures; Vascular disorders.
- HLGT – 337
- HLT – 1,739
- PT – 27,163
- LLT – 90,471

== Maintenance of MedDRA ==
MedDRA is hierarchical, multiaxial, multilingual, regularly-updated, and strictly maintained by the Maintenance and Support Services Organization (MSSO). ICH holds the intellectual property rights (ownership) of MedDRA.

Subscriber feedback is used to aid in revisions and updates.

MedDRA is available free for all regulators worldwide, academics, health care providers, and non-profit organizations. The subscription price is based according to company revenue for the industry. The Japanese counterpart for the MSSO is called the Japanese Maintenance Organization (JMO).

Four types of subscriptions are available from the MSSO:

- regulatory agency
- non-profit/non-commercial (such as medical library, educational institution, organization engaged in not for profit activities)
- commercial
- system developer (developer of software products that utilize MedDRA).

The MSSO updates MedDRA according to subscriber change requests, for example, to add a new medical concept that is not yet in MedDRA or to change/modify an existing concept. The decisions on submitted change requests are made by a team of international medical officers on how to map the terminology within the grouping categories according to a general team consensus. The final decisions are based on multiple factors including the Points to Consider documentation, implications on legacy data, and language considerations internationally.

The MSSO and JMO release updated MedDRA versions twice a year - in March and September. The English and Japanese translation are released on 1 March and September and all other translations are released on the 15th. The March release is the main annual release and contains changes at the HLT level and above along with LLT and PT changes. The September release contains changes only at the LLT and PT level. As of September 2024, Version 27.1 is the most recent version.

As global regulators expand the scope of product types they regulate, there is a corresponding increase in the adaptation of and interest in the proactive use of MedDRA before regulatory mandates. Such expansion has increased in MedDRA terms applicable to many product types. The addition of the 27th SOC Product issues in Version 19.0 has further expanded use of MedDRA for product quality, supply, distribution, manufacturing and quality system issue as well as device issues.

== See also ==
- COSTART
- Systematized Nomenclature of Medicine (and SNOMED CT)
- WHOART the latest version of MedDRA is 20.1 updated in September-2017
- Medicines and Healthcare products Regulatory Agency (MHRA)
- International Classification of Diseases (ICD)
- Pharmacovigilance
