= Heads of Medicines Agencies =

- Predecessor: Heads of Agencies
- Formation: 1996; 29 years ago
- Type: Governmental organization
- Purpose: Cooperation on the regulation of pharmaceutical drugs
- Region served: European Economic Area
- Website: www.hma.eu

The Heads of Medicines Agencies (HMA) is a network of both the human and veterinary medicines agencies of the European Economic Area.

The HMA co-operates with the European Medicines Agency and the European Commission (Directorate-General for Health and Food Safety) in the operation of the European medicines regulatory system. The network provides a forum for the co-ordination and the exchange of views and proposals on issues concerning the European regulatory system and the role of the national authorities within that system.

The HMA, initially known as the Heads of Agencies, was established in 1995 with a first full meeting taking place in Amsterdam in February 1996. Initially the network comprised only agencies responsible for the regulation of medicines for human use. In February 1998, a parallel group bringing together the heads of agencies responsible for medicines for veterinary use held its first meeting. The two groups started organising joint meetings in 2000 and since 2004 these activities have been integrated under the umbrella of the HMA.

== Membership ==
The HMA comprises 46 national competent authorities responsible for the regulation of human and/or veterinary medicines. These 46 national authorities represent the 28 EU member states as well as the three additional European Economic Area members, Iceland, Liechtenstein and Norway.

Of the 46 NCAs, 15 have responsibility only for human medicines; 14 are purely veterinary agencies; 17 are joint veterinary and human agencies; and some veterinary agencies are integrated with their respective national food safety agencies or respective ministries. Some have responsibility for pricing and reimbursement of human medicines. 22 have joint responsibility for medicines and medical devices. All are accountable to their national governments.

Together with the European Medicines Agency and the European Commission, these national authorities form the European medicines regulatory system.

== Main activities ==
Medicines can be authorised in Europe through a number of ways:

- The centralised procedure, which is the responsibility of the European Medicines Agency
- National procedures, which are the responsibility of the national authority of each country
- Non-centralised procedures, co-ordinated by the HMA:
  - The decentralised procedure
  - Mutual-recognition procedures.

The initial focus of the network in 1995 was the operation of a Mutual Recognition Facilitation Group which was given full legal status in 2003 as the HMA mandated Co-ordination Group for Mutual Recognition and Decentralised Procedures (CMD). In 2012, new European pharmacovigilance legislation added to the role and decision-making powers of the CMD in respect of human medicines.

Over the years, the HMA has added to its coordination activities to include clinical trials authorisation, worksharing of safety aspects, pediatric indications, interpretation of legal provisions and product testing. It has also established a number of shared initiatives across the network which has resulted in Europe-wide projects concerning IT infrastructure, benchmarking, training programs and communication policy. These projects are intended to bring efficiencies and greater consistency to the European medicines regulatory system.

== Operations ==
The HMA is based on a model of cooperation and worksharing across statutory as well as voluntary regulatory activities. The network does not have a permanent executive or head office. However a HMA member agency is requested to support the network by providing professional and scientific resources.

The Management Group, consisting of a number of national heads, co-ordinates and facilitates the operation of the HMA and also supervises the work of the HMA Permanent Secretariat. The HMA PS facilitates and supports the work of the HMA, the HMA MG and the EU presidency by ensuring co-ordination, consistency and continuity of their work and activities and providing the collective memory of HMA.

After the finalisation of a joint HMA/EMA strategy to 2020, in February 2016 the HMA adopted a Multi Annual Work Plan to bring the joint overarching strategy into operation on the HMA level with the involvement of all National Competent Authorities.
