= Saba Ali Khan =

Indian jewellery designer (born 1976)

- Born: Saba Ali Khan Pataudi; 1 May 1976 (age 50); New Delhi, India
- House: House of Pataudi; House of Bhopal
- Father: Mansoor Ali Khan
- Mother: Sharmila Tagore
- Occupation: Jewellery designer

Saba Ali Khan Pataudi (born 1 May 1976) is an Indian jewellery designer and mutawalli (Chief Trustee) of the Auqaf-e-Shahi (Royal Trust), established by the-then Princely State of the Kingdom of Bhopal as a royal charitable endowment.

== Family background ==
Khan, a member of the Pataudi family of Pashtun ancestry, is the daughter of cricketer Mansoor Ali Khan Pataudi, and actress Sharmila Tagore of the Tagore family. Khan is the sister of actors, Saif Ali Khan and Soha Ali Khan. Actors Sara Ali Khan and Ibrahim Ali Khan are her niece and nephew through her brother's marriage with actress Amrita Singh, while actress Kareena Kapoor is her sister-in-law.

Khan is the granddaughter of Sajida Sultan, the Nawab Begum of Bhopal, and Iftikhar Ali Khan Pataudi, the Nawab of Pataudi. Her maternal great-grandfather, Hamidullah Khan, succeeded the throne of Bhopal, after a long reign of royal queens. She is the first cousin of cricketer Saad Bin Jung. Pakistan Army veteran Sher Ali Khan Pataudi is her paternal great-granduncle, and the Pakistani diplomat Shahryar Khan is her uncle, through her maternal grandaunt Abida Sultan.

== Auqaf-e-Shahi ==
The Auqaf-e-Shahi is a charitable trust that was endowed by the royal family of the Kingdom of the State of Bhopal. The trust manages a portfolio worth Rs 1200 crore, consisting mainly of real estate (both, religious and otherwise) in Bhopal, apart from properties in Mecca as well as Medina in Saudi Arabia. As a convention, a family member of the ruler of the state of Bhopal, or the ruler himself, was the mutawalli, the chief trustee who managed the assets of the trust for philanthropic purposes. Indian cricket captain Mansoor Ali Khan, who was the titular Nawab of Bhopal and Pataudi was the mutawalli till his death in 2011. Saba served under her father as naib mutawalli (Deputy Trustee) before taking over the reigns after his demise, while her brother Saif Ali Khan inherited the titular titles of the Nawab of Bhopal and Pataudi, and the respective estates.

Mansoor Ali Khan reportedly did not think of his son as a possible mutawalli, conscious that a film actor's appointment as head of Islamic religious bodies may not go down well with certain sections.

In her tenure as the mutawalli, Auqaf-e-Shahi has acquired certain additional properties in Mecca. In 2016, she announced that the Waqf tribunal has declared that 34 acres of land around the Shahi Qabristan in Bhopal belonged to Auqaf-e-Shahi, and the same would be monetised with the proceeds going to improve the educational and health institutions of Bhopal.
