= Soha Ali Khan =

Indian film actress (born 1978)

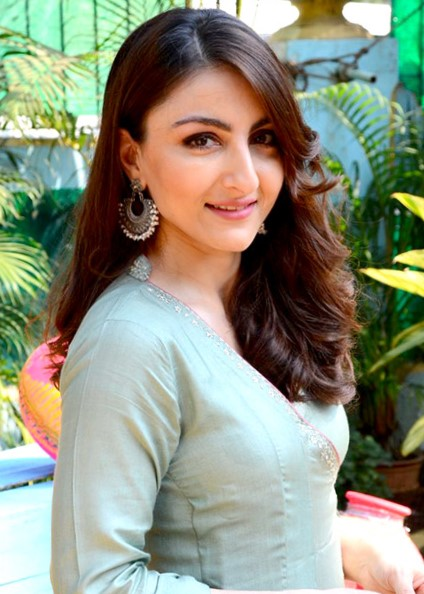
- Khan in 2018
- Born: Soha Ali Khan Pataudi; 4 October 1978 (age 48); New Delhi, India
- Education: Oxford University, London School of Economics
- Occupation: Actress
- Years active: 2004–present
- Spouse: Kunal Khemu (m. 2015)
- Children: 1
- Parents: Mansoor Ali Khan (father); Sharmila Tagore (mother)
- Family: Pataudi family Tagore family

Soha Ali Khan Pataudi (born 4 October 1978) is an Indian actress who has worked in Hindi, Bengali, and English films. She is the younger daughter of veteran actress Sharmila Tagore and former India cricket captain Mansoor Ali Khan, of Bhopal, and the younger sister of actor Saif Ali Khan. She started her acting career with the period drama film Iti Srikanta (2004) and is best known for her role in the drama film Rang De Basanti (2006) and the romance film Ahista Ahista (2006). In 2017, she authored a book The Perils of Being Moderately Famous that won the Crossword Book Award in 2018. She is married to actor Kunal Khemu, with whom she has a daughter.

== Early life and background ==
Khan was born on 4 October 1978 in New Delhi, India, to the Pataudi family as the Nawab of Pataudis. She is the youngest daughter of Mansoor Ali Khan Pataudi, the 9th Nawab of Pataudi hailing from the Barech tribe of Pashtuns, and Sharmila Tagore, an actress of Bengali-Assamese descent hailing from the Tagore family. Both her father Mansoor Ali Khan Pataudi and paternal grandfather Iftikhar Ali Khan Pataudi were former captains of the Indian cricket team, while her grandmother, Sajida Sultan Pataudi, was the Begum of Bhopal.

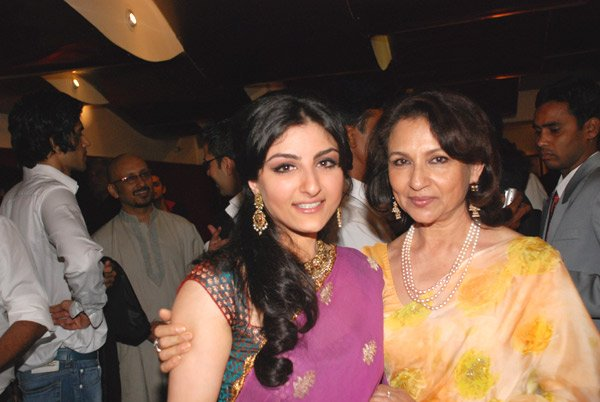
Khan with mother Sharmila Tagore at the premiere Of Khoya Khoya Chand

Khan's elder brother Saif Ali Khan is a Bollywood actor and her elder sister, Saba Ali Khan, is a jewellery designer and the mutawalli of Auqaf-e-Shahi. The titular Begum of Bhopal, Saleha Sultan, was her aunt, and through her, she is the first cousin of cricketer, Saad Bin Jung. The late major general of Pakistan, Sher Ali Khan Pataudi, is her great-granduncle, and the diplomat Shahryar Khan is her uncle, through her grandaunt Abida Sultan. She is the aunt of Sara Ali Khan and Ibrahim Ali Khan and the sister-in-law of Kareena Kapoor Khan.

Khan attended The British School, in New Delhi, studied modern history at Balliol College, Oxford and earned a master's degree in International Relations from the London School of Economics and Political Science.

== Career ==
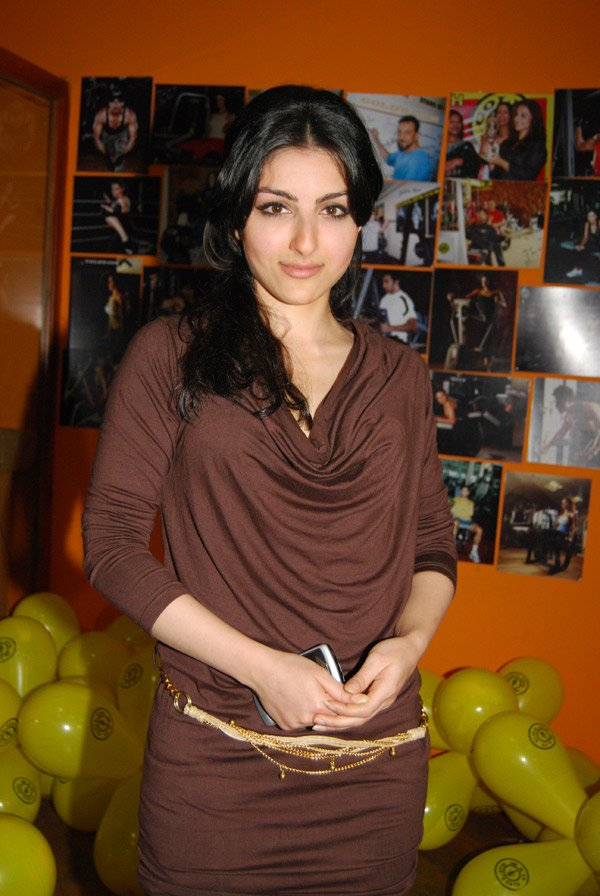
Khan at an event

Khan made her acting debut in 2004 with the Bengali film Iti Srikanta, playing a Vaishnavite. In the same year, she made her Hindi film debut with Dil Maange More!!! opposite Shahid Kapoor, which failed at the box office. She performed in another Bengali film Antar Mahal (2005) and then appeared in several box office failures.

The year 2006 proved a turning point in Khan's career. Her most notable role came in the political drama Rang De Basanti, where she played dual roles of a college student and Durgawati Devi. The film became one of the year's highest grossing release and earned her the IIFA Award for Best Supporting Actress and a nomination for the Filmfare Award for Best Supporting Actress. Calling her "efficient", Taran Adarsh found her performance to be a complete revelation. She then played a girl who runs away from home opposite Abhay Deol in the romance Ahista Ahista. Vinayak Chakravorty stated that she is "perfect" as the soft foil.

Following this, Khan appeared in several films such as Khoya Khoya Chand opposite Shiney Ahuja, 99 opposite Kunal Khemu, Tum Mile, opposite Emraan Hashmi and Mr Joe B. Carvalho opposite Arshad Warsi. Khan hosted the game show Godrej Khelo Jeeto Jiyo. In 2017, Khan acted in a short film, Soundproof, which was directed by Aditya Kelgaonkar. It was screened at various film festivals and won awards at the New York Indian Film Festival, Indian Film Festival of Houston, Ottawa Indian Film Festival Awards, where it won best short film award; International Documentary and Short Film Festival of Kerala, where it won award for best short fiction; and Belgaum International Short Film Festival. Her other box office successes include Saheb, Biwi Aur Gangster Returns opposite Jimmy Sheirgill, and Ghayal: Once Again opposite Sunny Deol.

Post a hiatus from acting, Khan expanded to web in 2022 with Kaun Banegi Shikharwati and Hush Hush. Archika Khurana of The Times of India found her to be "graceful and royal". Following a seven year hiatus from films, Khan returned with the 2025 horror film Chhorii 2, where she played a vampire cult head. Rahul Desai of The Hollywood Reporter India found her character to be the film's only "productive entity".

== Off-screen work ==
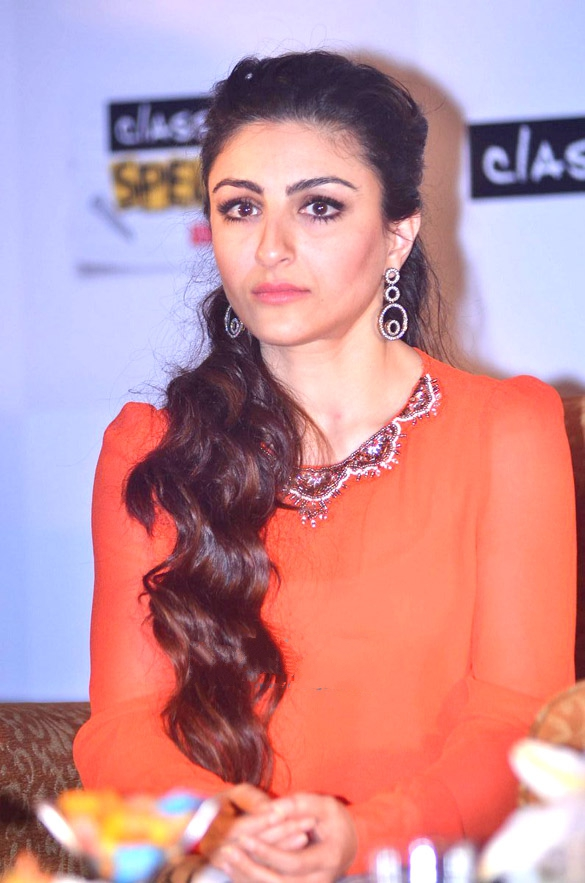
Khan at Classmate Spell Bee 2014

In addition to her acting career, Khan is a celebrity endorser for brands and products such as Club Mahindra, House of Pataudi, and Earthrag, among others. In 2022, she was appointed as the brand advocate for New Zealand education in India.

Khan authored her memoir named, The Perils of Being Moderately Famous, which was released in 2017. In 2018, Khan won the Crossword Book Award for her book.

== Personal life ==
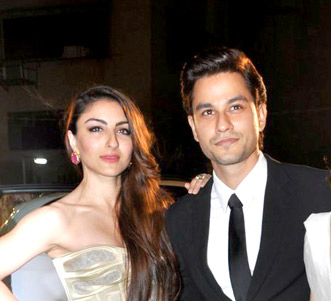
Khan with her husband Kunal Khemu in 2016

Khan was in a relationship with actor Kunal Khemu since 2009. Khan got engaged to Khemu in July 2014 in Paris and married him in Hindu wedding ceremony in Mumbai on 25 January 2015. She gave birth to their daughter, Inaaya Naumi Khemu on 29 September 2017. Following her marriage to Khemu, she became a practitioner of Hinduism.

== All About Her podcast ==
Soha Ali Khan launched a wellness‑focused podcast titled All About Her in August 2025, aiming to create an open and supportive space for conversations around women's health, ageing, and self‑kindness. The podcast addresses topics such as perimenopause, hormonal changes, insecurities, and broader wellness concerns that Khan believes are often under‑discussed.

In an episode about positive parenting, Kareena Kapoor Khan discussed her approach to motherhood and balancing loving yet vigilant parenting during her appearance on the podcast along with mental health practitioner Riri Trivedi.

In interviews, she noted that her personal experiences with ageing and consultations with various health experts informed the show’s direction, emphasising that the platform is intended to start meaningful discussions rather than provide prescriptive advice.

== Filmography ==
Key
†	Denotes films that have not yet been released

=== Films ===
Year	Title	Role(s)	Notes	Ref.
2004	Iti Srikanta	Kamallata	Bengali film	
2004	Dil Maange More	Neha Chopra		
2005	Pyaar Mein Twist	Riya Arya		
2005	Shaadi No. 1	Sonia		
2005	Antarmahal	Jasomati	Bengali film	
2006	Rang De Basanti	Sonia / Durga Vohra		
2006	Ahista Ahista	Megha Joshi		
2007	Khoya Khoya Chand	Nikhat		
2007	Chaurahen	Ira	English film	
2008	Mumbai Meri Jaan	Rupali Joshi		
2008	Dil Kabaddi	Mita Wadia		
2009	Dhoondte Reh Jaaoge	Neha Chattopadhayay		
2009	99	Pooja		
2009	Tum Mile	Sanjana		
2009	Life Goes On	Diya Banerjee	English film	
2010	Mumbai Cutting		Segment: "The Ball"	
2010	Tera Kya Hoga Johnny	Preeti		
2011	Soundtrack	Gauri		
2012	Midnight's Children	Jamila	English film	
2013	Saheb, Biwi Aur Gangster Returns	Ranjana		
2013	Go Goa Gone	Hardiks's ex-girlfriend	Cameo appearance	
2013	War Chhod Na Yaar	Ruth Dutta		
2014	Mr Joe B. Carvalho	Shantipriya Fadnis		
2014	Chaarfutiya Chhokare	Neha Malini		
2016	31st October	Tejinder Kaur		
2016	Ghayal: Once Again	Rhea		
2018	Saheb, Biwi Aur Gangster 3	Ranjana	Cameo appearance	
2023	Sound Proof		Short film	
2025	Chhorii 2	Daasi Maa		
TBA	Bridge †	TBA	Filming	

=== Web series ===
Year	Title	Role(s)	Notes	Ref.
2022	Kaun Banegi Shikharwati	Rajkumari Gayatri	ZEE5	
2022	Hush Hush	Saiba	Amazon Prime Video	

== Awards and nominations ==
Year	Award	Category	Film / Book	Result	Ref.
2006	Global Indian Film Awards	Best Actress in A Supporting Role	Rang De Basanti	Won	
2007	International Indian Film Academy Awards	Best Supporting Actress	Rang De Basanti	Won	
2007	Bengal Film Journalists' Association Awards	Best Supporting Actress – Hindi	Rang De Basanti	Won	
2007	Filmfare Awards	Best Supporting Actress	Rang De Basanti	Nominated	
2007	Stardust Awards	Superstar of Tomorrow – Female	Rang De Basanti	Nominated	
2009	Producers Guild Film Awards	Best Actress in a Leading Role	Khoya Khoya Chand	Nominated	
2018	Crossword Book Award	Biography: Popular	The Perils of Being Moderately Famous	Won	
2023	India UK Achievers Honours	Outstanding Achiever (Arts, Entertainment & Culture)	—N/a	Won	

== Bibliography ==
- Khan, Soha Ali (2017). Perils of Being Moderately Famous. Penguin Random House. ISBN 978-0-14-343996-7.

== See also ==
- List of Indian film actresses
- List of Hindi film actresses
