= Pataudi family =

Indian dynasty of nawabs that has also been prominent in film and cricket

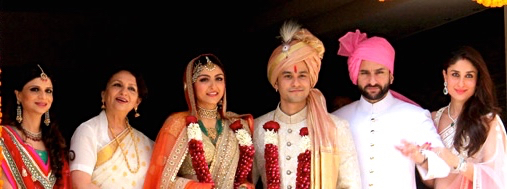
- Members of Pataudi family in 2015
- Country: India
- Current region: Mumbai, India
- Origin: Kandahar, Afghanistan
- Founded: 1804
- Founder: Faiz Talab Khan Pataudi
- Current head: Saif Ali Khan Pataudi
- Final ruler: Mansoor Ali Khan Pataudi
- Titles: Nawab of Pataudi
- Styles: List: Nawab; Begum; Sultana
- Connected families: List: Mirazi Khel dynasty; Orakzai dynasty; Paigah family; Kheshgi family; Tagore family; Kapoor family
- Estate: Pataudi Palace
- Dissolution: 1971
- Deposition: 1948
- They ruled the Pataudi State from 1804 to 1971 and have been honoree rulers since 1971.

The Pataudi family is an Indian family. They are currently in show business and primarily working in India's Hindi film industry, commonly known as 'Bollywood'.

They are also noted as the family of erstwhile nawabs of the former princely state of Pataudi, from which they take their name. Faiz Talab Khan, an ethnic Pashtun from the Barech tribe of Kandahar, Afghanistan, became the first Nawab of Pataudi State in 1804, after he aided the British East India Company in their battle against the Maratha Empire, during the Second Anglo-Maratha War.

Faiz Talab Khan initially served the Maratha Empire during the late eighteenth century, at a time when Maratha power was dominant across northern India following the decline of Mughal authority. He received the pargana (administrative district) of Rohtak from Maratha ruler Daulat Rao Scindia in recognition of his military services. Following the defeat of the Marathas in northern India in 1803 in the Second Anglo-Maratha War, Faiz Talab Khan transferred his allegiance to the British East India Company.

His descendants subsequently ruled the state until 1949, when it was merged with East Punjab and acceded to Dominion of India. Some of the family members migrated to the newly formed Muslim-majority Dominion of Pakistan, including Sher Ali Khan Pataudi, who served as a major-general in the Pakistan Army.

The Pataudis retained their titles and were granted privy purses until both were abolished by the Indian government in 1971. The last ruling nawab was Iftikhar Ali Khan Pataudi and the last recognised titular nawab was his son Mansoor Ali Khan Pataudi. The current patriarch of the family is Saif Ali Khan.

Both Iftikhar Ali Khan Pataudi and Mansoor Ali Khan Pataudi were accomplished cricket players who played for, and also captained, the Indian national cricket team; the former had also played for the England cricket team in 1930s. The current members of the family consist mostly of actors who work predominantly in the Hindi-language film industry.

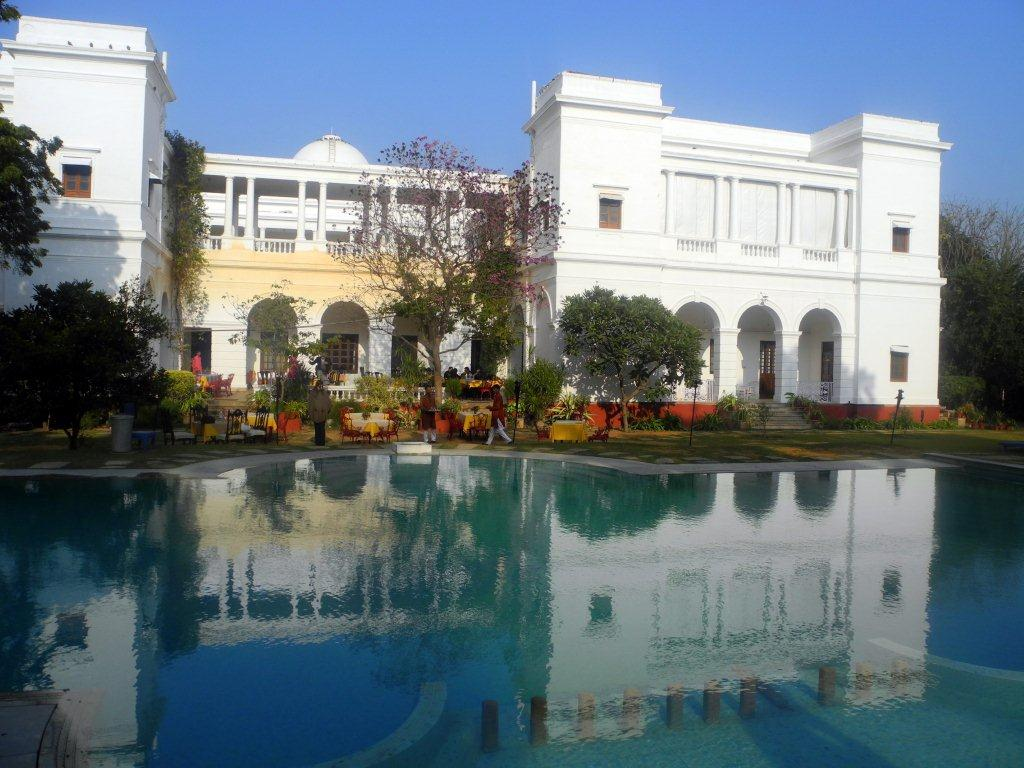
View of Pataudi Palace.

== Notable members ==
- Iftikhar Ali Khan Pataudi - 8th Nawab of Pataudi: cricket player; married Sajida Sultan, titular Nawab Begum of Bhopal
  - Mansoor Ali Khan, 9th and Last Nawab of Pataudi: cricket player; son of Iftikhar Ali Khan and Sajida Sultan; married actress Sharmila Tagore
    - Saif Ali Khan: actor; current patriarch of the family, son of Mansoor Ali Khan and Sharmila Tagore; married actress Amrita Singh, in 1991 and they divorced in 2004; married to actress Kareena Kapoor Khan since 2012
      - Sara Ali Khan: actress; daughter of Saif Ali Khan and Amrita Singh (b. 1995)
      - Ibrahim Ali Khan - actor; son of Saif Ali Khan and Amrita Singh (b. 2001)
    - Soha Ali Khan: actress; daughter of Mansoor Ali Khan and Sharmila Tagore; married to actor Kunal Khemu.
      - Inaaya Naumi Kemmu: daughter of Soha Ali Khan and Kunal Kemmu (b. 2017)
    - Saba Ali Khan: jewellery designer; daughter of Mansoor Ali Khan and Sharmila Tagore
- Sher Ali Khan Pataudi: son of the 7th Nawab; a major general in the Pakistan Army
  - Isfandiyar Ali Khan Pataudi: a Major General in the Pakistan Army and deputy director of the Inter-Services Intelligence
- Saad Bin Jung - cricketer; son of Begum Saleha Sultan

=== Notable relatives ===
- Shahryar Khan - former diplomat and chairman of the Pakistan Cricket Board (nephew of Begum Sajida Sultan)
- Sadiq Hussain Qureshi - Pakistan's former Governor and Chief Minister of Punjab (husband of Begum Haseen Bano; son-in-law of Begum Abida Sultana)
- Ashiq Hussain Qureshi - former cricketer, civil servant and captain in the Pakistan Army (son of Begum Haseen Bano, grandson of Begum Abida Sultana)

== Photos of the notable members of the family ==
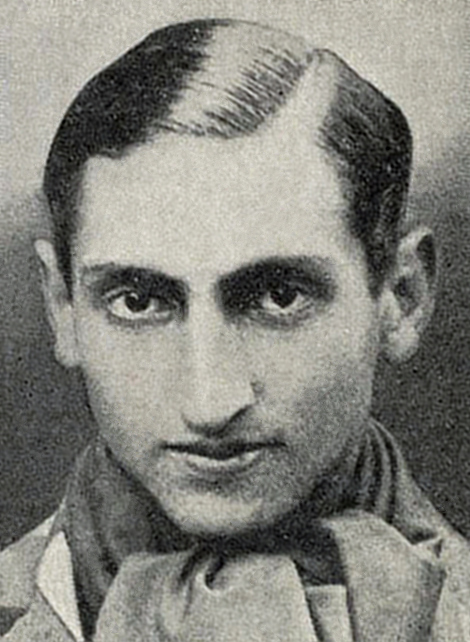
Iftikhar Ali Khan Pataudi

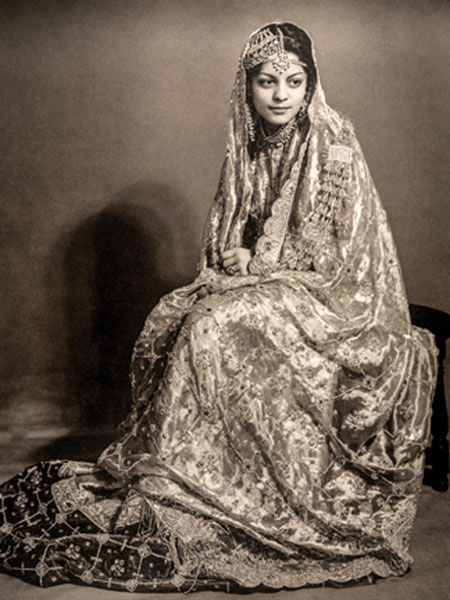
Sajida Sultan

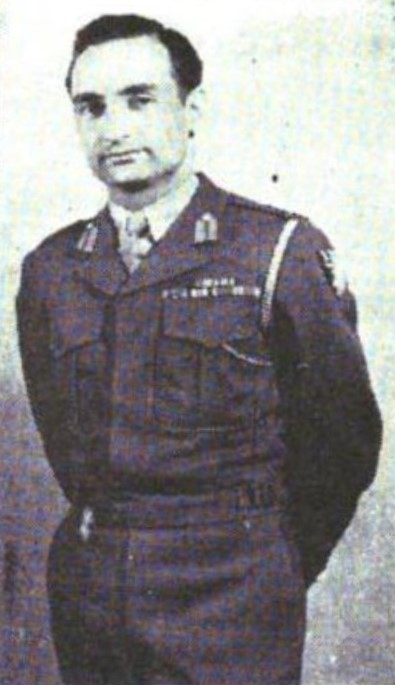
Sher Ali Khan Pataudi

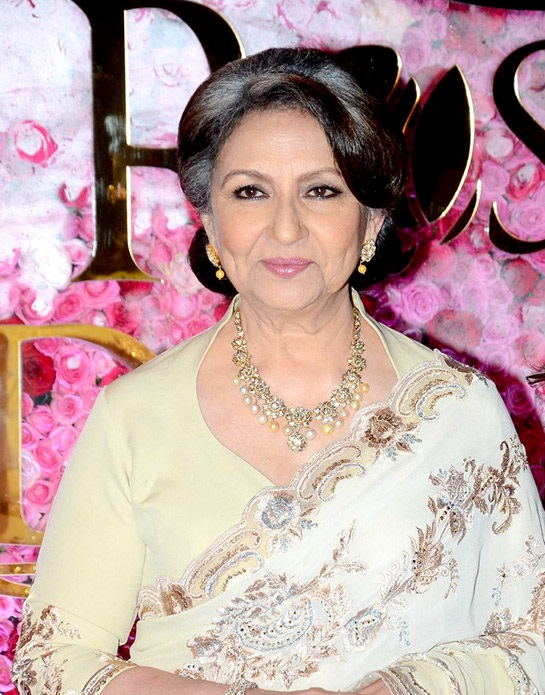
Sharmila Tagore

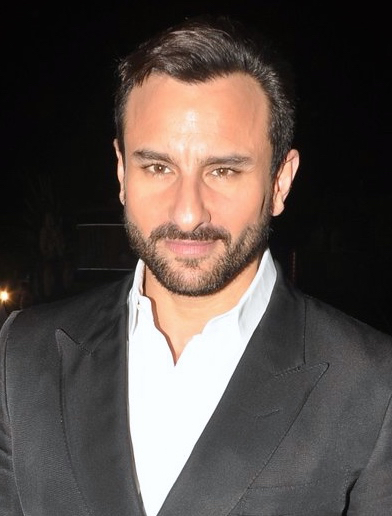
Saif Ali Khan

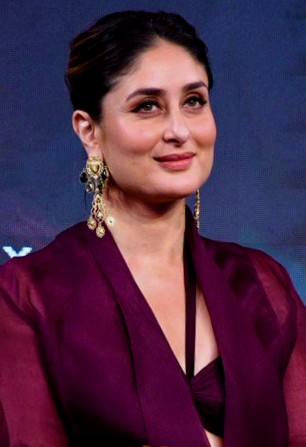
Kareena Kapoor Khan

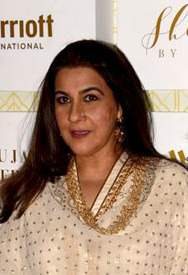
Amrita Singh

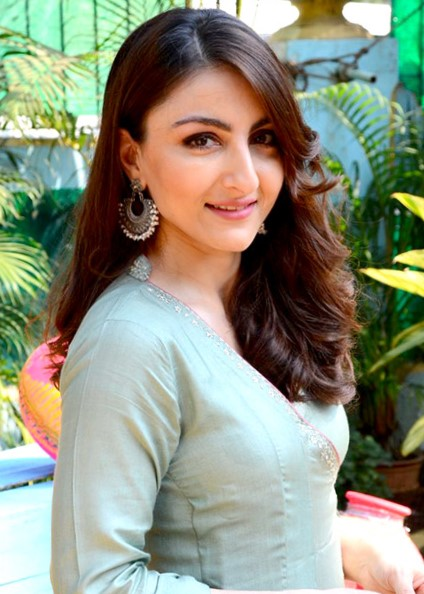
Soha Ali Khan

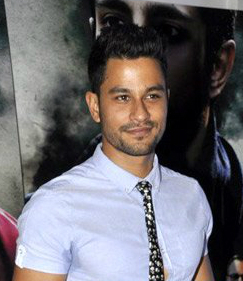
Kunal Khemu

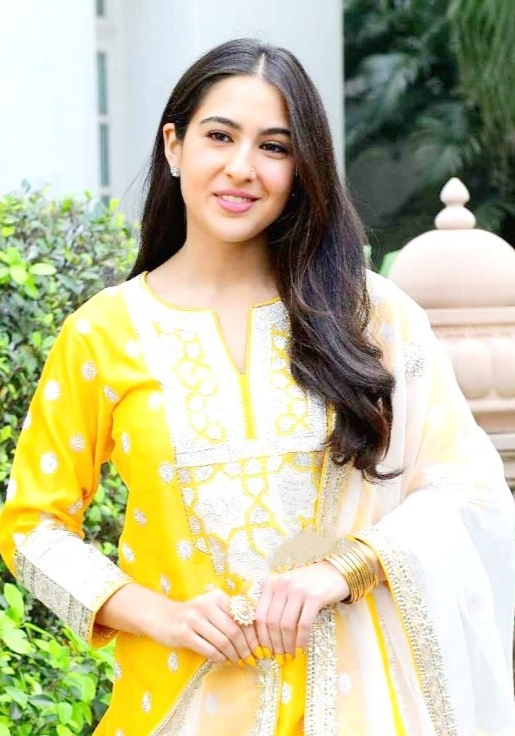
Sara Ali Khan

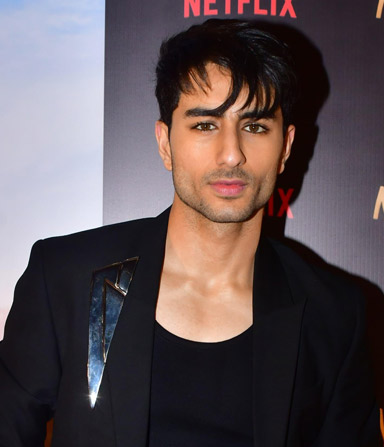
Ibrahim Ali Khan

== See also ==
- Nawabs of Pataudi
