= Sajida Sultan =

Nawab Begum of Bhopal

- Nawab Begum of Bhopal; Begum Consort of Pataudi
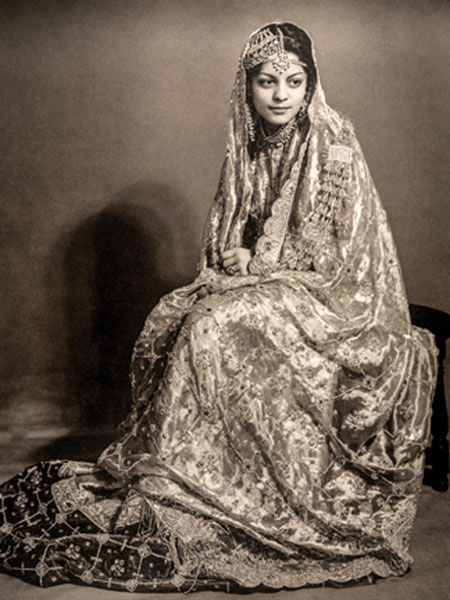
- Ex-Begum Consort of Pataudi

Nawab Begum of Bhopal
- Titular: 1960–1971
- Predecessor: Hamidullah Khan
- Successor: Mansoor Ali Khan

Begum Consort of Pataudi
- Tenure Titular: 1939–1947; 1947–1952
- Predecessor: Shahar Bano Begum
- Successor: Sharmila Tagore
- Born: 4 August 1915; Ahmedabad, Bhopal State, Central India, British India (now-in Madhya Pradesh, India)
- Died: 5 September 1995 (aged 80); Bhopal, Madhya Pradesh, India
- Burial: Saifia Masjid, Bhopal, India
- Spouse: Iftikhar Ali Khan Pataudi (m. 1938; died 1952)
- Issue: 4 (incl. Mansoor Ali Khan)
- House: Mirazi Khel Pataudi family (via marriage)
- Father: Hamidullah Khan
- Mother: Maimoona Sultan

Nawab Begum Sajida Sultan Ali Khan Pataudi (4 August 1915 – 5 September 1995) was the daughter of the Nawab of Bhopal, Hamidullah Khan, and the wife and Begum Consort of Iftikhar Ali Khan Pataudi, the 8th Nawab of Pataudi, and in her own right, the 12th Nawab Begum of Bhopal.

== Biography ==
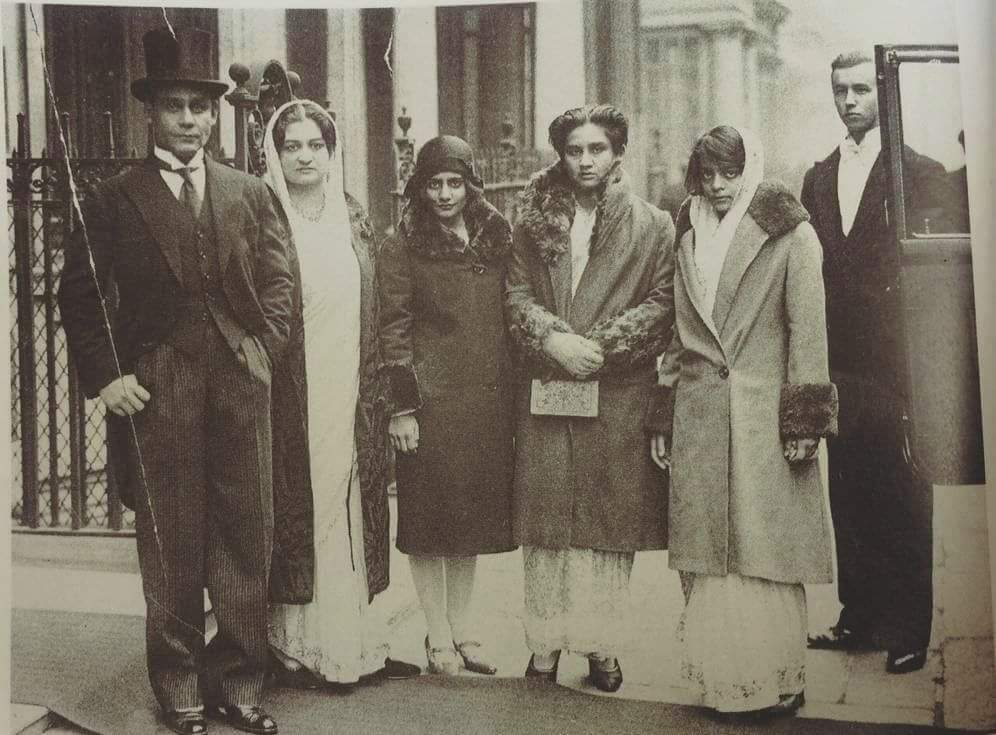
Bhopal royal family. From left to right: Nawab Hamidullah Khan, his wife Begum Maimoona Sultan, their daughters—Rabia Sultan, Abida Sultan, Sajida Sultan in London, 1932

Sajida Sultan was born on 4 August 1915 in the Qasr-e-Sultani Palace, Bhopal, to Nawab Hamidullah Khan, last ruling Nawab of Bhopal and his wife, Begum Maimoona Sultan. She was the second of three children; she had an older sister, Abida Sultan, and a younger sister, Rabia Sultan. Sultan Jahan, the Begum of Bhopal, was her grandmother, and her predecessor Shah Jahan Begum was her great-grandmother. The Pakistani diplomat Shahryar Khan, is her nephew through her sister Abida.

On 23 April 1939, Sajida married Nawab Iftikhar Ali Khan, 8th Nawab of Pataudi. Together they had three daughters – Saleha, Sabiha, and Qudsia – and a son, the cricketer Mansoor Ali Khan Pataudi. Sher Ali Khan Pataudi, the major general in the Pakistan Army was her brother-in-law by marriage. The actors Saif Ali Khan and Soha Ali Khan, the jewelry designer Saba Ali Khan and the cricketer Saad Bin Jung are her grandsons and granddaughters. Sara Ali Khan, an actress in the Hindi film industry is her great-granddaughter.

On 5 January 1952, Iftikhar Ali Khan died and Mansoor succeeded his father as the 9th titular Nawab of Pataudi.

In 1960, upon the death of her father, she became the titular ruler of Bhopal. Her older sister, Abida, was the heiress apparent to the title but had emigrated to Pakistan in 1950 and declined to return to Bhopal permanently; her son declined also. Sajida was formally recognised as the Nawab Begum of Bhopal in 1962, with recognition being effective from 1960.

She died on 5 September 1995 at the age of 80. Mansoor Ali Khan subsequently became the mutawalli of the Auqaf-e-Shahi of Bhopal, a title which is currently held by her granddaughter Saba Ali Khan.

== Issue ==
Name	Birth	Death	Spouse	Their children
Princess Saleha Sultan	14 January 1939	19 January 2020	Bashir Yar Jung	Aamer Bin Jung; Saad Bin Jung; Omer Bin Jung; Faiz Bin Jung
Nawab Mansoor Ali Khan	5 January 1941	22 September 2011	Sharmila Tagore	Saif Ali Khan; Saba Ali Khan; Soha Ali Khan
Princess Sabiha Sultan	30 March 1943	---	Arjuman Ali Khan	Zia Sultan; Samia Sultan
Princess Qudsia Sultan	15 March 1945	5 November 1989	Ghulam Fariduddin Riaz	Iftikharuddin Riaz; Sara Sultan

== See also ==
- Pataudi family
