= Saad Bin Jung =

Indian cricketer

Personal information
- Born: 26 October 1960 (age 66); Delhi, India
- Relatives: Paigah family; Pataudi family

Domestic team information
- Years: Team
- 1978/79–1980/81: Hyderabad
- 1978/79–1979/80: South Zone
- 1983/84: Haryana

Career statistics
Competition	First-class	List A
Matches	22	4
Runs scored	917	132
Batting average	28.65	33.00
100s/50s	2/5	0/1
Top score	136*	84
Balls bowled	18	–
Wickets	0	–
Bowling average	–	–
5 wickets in innings	–	–
10 wickets in match	–	–
Best bowling	–	–
Catches/stumpings	9/–	1/–
- Source: ESPNcricinfo, 27 June 2014

Saad Bin Jung (born 26 October 1960) is a former Indian cricketer who played first-class cricket from 1978 to 1984. He is now a conservationist and lives in his village of Mangala near Bandipur in Karnataka, whilst his children manage his wildlife resort, The Bison, on the Kabini River in South India.

== Early life and family ==
Saad Bin Jung was born into the Paigah family of Hyderabad state and the Pataudi family of the Pataudi State, and the royalty of Bhopal. He is the son of Nawab Bashir Yar Jung and his wife, the titular Begum of Bhopal, Saleha Sultan. The Paigah family was one of the highest feudal landowning families of Hyderabad. Saad's father, Bashir Yar Jung, was from the Paigah Vicar ul Umra, and his mother, Saleha Sultan, was the eldest daughter of her highness Sajida Sultan, the Begum of Bhopal and Iftikhar Ali Khan Pataudi, Nawab of Pataudi, and was the sister of cricketer Mansoor Ali Khan Pataudi, the 9th Nawab of Pataudi. Both nawabs, known respectively as "Pataudi Senior" and "Pataudi Junior", were distinguished cricketers who captained the Indian Test team.

Saad is the great-grandson of Hamidullah Khan, the Nawab of Bhopal, who succeeded to the throne of Bhopal after a long reign of royal queens. His paternal grandfather, Nawab Sir Viqar-ul-Umra was the Prime Minister of Hyderabad, who constructed the Falaknuma Palace. Actress Sharmila Tagore is his aunt by marriage (Mansoor's wife), and the actors Saif Ali Khan and Soha Ali Khan are his first cousins.

Saad grew up in Hyderabad, where he attended Hyderabad Public School and Nizam College.

== Cricket career ==
After playing schools cricket in the Cooch Behar Trophy, Saad Bin Jung was selected just after his 18th birthday to play his first-class debut match for India Under-22s against the touring West Indians in November 1978. Opening the batting, he made 58, batting "most impressively, using the hook and cover-drive to advantage" against the pace attack of Sylvester Clarke, Malcolm Marshall and Vanburn Holder. Two weeks later, also against the West Indians, he made 113 for South Zone, batting at number three, out of a team total of 283 for 8 declared. Wisden declared that he "batted with calm assurance" and held out "promise of playing Test cricket in the future".

He was selected for an Indian Board President's XI against the West Indians later in the season, and also against the Pakistan touring team early the next season, the latter was ruined by rain and he did not bat. He also played Duleep Trophy matches for South Zone in 1979–80. His innings of note in 1979–80 was 136 not out in seven hours, batting for Hyderabad against Tamil Nadu in the Ranji Trophy, the only century in a drawn match.

After two matches in 1980–81 he contracted an illness which led to a long period of hospitalisation. After recovery, disenchanted with cricket in Hyderabad, he played the 1983–84 season with Haryana, scoring 256 runs at an average of 32.00 in six matches, helping Haryana to reach the Ranji Trophy semi-finals. He then retired from cricket at the age of 23.

== Conservation career ==
Saad and his wife Sangeeta now run their eco-resorts on the banks of the Kabini River in Karnataka. They started their conservation career at Bandipur National Park in Karnataka in 1992 where they still run The Bandipur Cottage. They owned a wildlife lodge in Bandipur which Sangeeta decided to convert into an eco-resort. As Bandipur turned commercial, they purchased a piece of land near the Kabini backwaters in 1993. Today their son Shaaz and daughter Zoha Jung run the eco-tourism resort with African-style tents and local cuisine. Zoha has also established an equine rescue centre at the camp. She has achieved international acclaim for her work.

The family aims to reconcile the needs of the local people with the needs of conservation through a sustained process of dialogue and trust-building utilizing eco-tourism as the integral tool for conservation. They have also been taking safari tours to Africa since 1995.

Saad has written three books, all with conservation themes: Wild Tales from the Wild, about the people and wildlife of the Mangala valley in Karnataka; Subhan and I: My Adventure with the Angling Legend of India, about angling for mahseer in the Cauvery River; and a historical novel, Matabele Dawn, a thriller set in Africa and India.

== Personal life ==
Saad has been married to Sangeeta Jung since 1985. They have a daughter and a son. Saad and his wife have homes near Bandipur and in Indiranagar, an eastern suburb of Bangalore.
