= Sara Ali Khan =

Indian actress (born 1995)

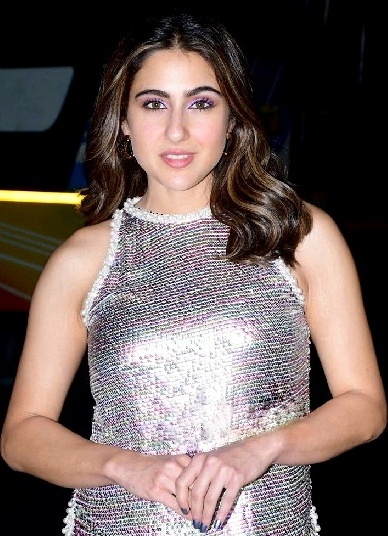
- Khan in 2023
- Born: Sara Sultan (Note: Her business filings have her legal name as Sara Sultan. See SWAPNASUNDARI TALENT PRIVATE LIMITED whose directors are Sara and her mother Amrita Singh. Wikipedia uses the legal name for introduction.); 12 August 1995 (age 31); Bombay, Maharashtra, India
- Education: Columbia University (BA)
- Occupation: Actress
- Years active: 2018–present
- Parents: Saif Ali Khan (father); Amrita Singh (mother)
- Relatives: Pataudi family

Sara Ali Khan Pataudi (pronounced [saːɾa əˈli xaːn]; born Sara Sultan, 12 August 1995) is an Indian actress who works in Hindi films. Born into the Pataudi family, she is the daughter of actors Amrita Singh and Saif Ali Khan. Khan is the recipient of a Filmfare Award and has appeared in Forbes India's Celebrity 100 list of 2019.

After graduating with a degree in history and political science from Columbia University, Khan began her acting career in 2018 with commercially successful films—the romantic drama Kedarnath and the action comedy Simmba. The former earned her the Filmfare Award for Best Female Debut. Alongside several poorly received films, she starred in the drama Atrangi Re (2021) and found commercial success in the romantic comedies Zara Hatke Zara Bachke (2023) and Metro... In Dino (2025).

== Early life and background ==
Sara Sultan was born on 12 August 1995 (Note: Amrita says she is happy not working as she had already worked enough. She and Saif are fully engrossed in their five-year-old daughter Sara. "My daughter is very possessive about her father," says Amrita.) in Bombay, Maharashtra, to father, Saif Ali Khan (son of Mansoor Ali Khan Pataudi and Sharmila Tagore) and mother, Amrita Singh (daughter of socialite Rukhsana Sultana and Indian Army Officer Shivinder Singh Virk). Both her parents are actors of the Hindi film industry. Khan is of Pashtun, Assamese, and Bengali descent on her father's side, and of Punjabi descent on her mother's side. Sara was raised a Muslim.

Khan is also the great-granddaughter of Iftikhar Ali Khan Pataudi and Sajida Sultan, and the niece of Soha Ali Khan and Saba Ali Khan. She has a younger brother, Ibrahim Ali Khan, who is also an actor, and two half-brothers from her father's second marriage to Kareena Kapoor.

When Khan was a four-year-old, she acted in an advertisement. According to Saif, actress Aishwarya Rai proved to be her inspiration for pursuing a career in film after she saw her perform on stage in Chicago. In 2004, when Khan was nine, her parents divorced, and Singh was granted legal guardianship of her children. Saif was initially not allowed to see her or her brother; they have since reconciled, and, according to Saif, "are more like friends [than father and daughter]". Khan also shares a healthy relationship with Kapoor, her step-mother; she stated in 2018, "I would like to imbibe her professionalism in me".

As a teenager, Khan struggled with her weight, and had to undergo daily workouts under a strict schedule to get fit. She was also diagnosed with polyendocrine metabolic ovarian syndrome (PMOS), which she ascribes as a cause for her weight gain. Khan studied history and political science at Columbia University in New York. In 2016, she completed her graduation early, within three years, and took off the remaining 1 1/2 years for weight training, following which she returned to India.

== Career ==
=== Early success and setback (2018–2022) ===
Khan's acting debut came in 2018 with Abhishek Kapoor's romantic film Kedarnath, in which she played a Hindu girl, who falls in love with a Muslim porter, played by Sushant Singh Rajput. In preparation for her role, Khan improved her knowledge of Hindi vocabulary with help from Rajput. Kedarnath received mixed reviews with praise directed to Khan's performance. Kunal Guha of Mumbai Mirror found it to be a rehash of 1980s Hindi films but appreciated Khan's act: "When her Mukku is angry, hopeful, desperate or coltish, she often conveys it through her eyes alone — giving us a taste of the diverse faces she can throw on." Meena Iyer of Daily News and Analysis similarly labelled her "spectacular". Kedarnath emerged as a commercial success with a gross of over ₹960 million (US$10 million). Khan was awarded with the Filmfare Award for Best Female Debut and the IIFA Award for Star Debut of the Year – Female.

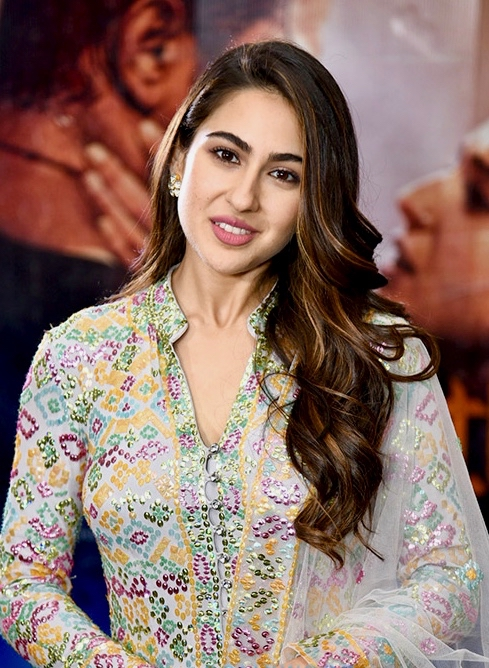
Khan promoting Kedarnath in 2018

A few weeks after the release of Kedarnath, Khan starred in Rohit Shetty's action film Simmba, alongside Ranveer Singh, which was loosely based on the Telugu-language film Temper (2015). She began work on it when filming of Kedarnath was temporarily suspended. This led to Abhishek Kapoor suing Khan; they later settled out of court when she agreed to split her time between both films. Reviewing the film for The Times of India, Ronak Kotecha opined that Khan had "precious little to do besides looking breathtakingly beautiful" and disliked the chemistry between her and Singh. With worldwide earnings of ₹4 billion (US$43 million), Simmba emerged as the third highest-grossing Hindi film of 2018.

In Imtiaz Ali's romantic drama Love Aaj Kal (2020), a spiritual successor to Ali's 2009 film of the same name, Khan starred as a young woman with a troubled past, opposite Kartik Aaryan. In a negative review of the film, Nandini Ramnath of Scroll.in bemoaned that Khan "simply doesn't have the experience or the expertise" to play a complex character, adding that "having a camera shoved into her young face only enlarges her shortcomings". It emerged as a box office bomb. In the same year, Khan starred opposite Varun Dhawan in the comedy film Coolie No. 1, an adaptation of David Dhawan's 1995 film of the same name. The film had strong viewership on Amazon Prime Video but it was unanimously panned by film critics. Khan was criticised for not adding any value to the film, with Anna M. M. Vetticad of Firstpost opining that Khan does nothing more than fill the slot of "the hero's love interest".

In 2021, Khan featured in dual roles as a woman with post-traumatic stress disorder, and her mother, in Aanand L. Rai's drama Atrangi Re, co-starring Akshay Kumar and Dhanush, which premiered on Disney+ Hotstar after multiple delays due to the nationwide lockdown due to the pandemic. The film received mixed reviews from critics. Monika Rawal Kukreja of Hindustan Times called her the "soul" of the film and praised her acting range and her Bihari accent. Conversely, in his review for Mint, Uday Bhatia criticised her "grating Bihari accent".

=== Further fluctuations and occasional success (2023–present) ===
Khan's next release was in 2023, in Gaslight, a whodunit that was filmed in 36 days, which also released on Disney+Hotstar. Saibal Chatterjee opined that her "earnest performance, like the rest of the film, is uneven". She next played opposite Vicky Kaushal as his wife, in Zara Hatke Zara Bachke, a romantic comedy about a small-town couple struggling for privacy. WION's Shomini Sen was critical of her "inconsistent performance", adding that she "overacts" in key scenes. It marked her first film to release theatrically since Love Aaj Kal in 2020. Against expectations, it emerged as a commercial success.

In 2024, Khan starred alongside an ensemble cast in Homi Adajania’s murder mystery Murder Mubarak as a young widow. The film released over Netflix. Anvita Singh of India Today bemoaned that Khan had gone "slightly overboard at times in a bid to sell her character [...] borderline hamming". She then starred in a biopic of freedom fighter Usha Mehta, titled Ae Watan Mere Watan, for Amazon Prime Video. Her performance was panned by critics, such as The Indian Express's Shubhra Gupta, who dismissed her as having "little impact" in the role.

In her first release of 2025, Khan portrayed the pregnant wife of a missing Air Force officer (played by Veer Pahariya) in Sky Force, an action film set amidst the Indo-Pakistani air war of 1965. Hindustan Times's Rishabh Suri was appreciative of the film, but wrote that Khan "gets very little screen space" and had failed to prove herself in a pivotal scene. It had poor box-office returns. Khan next starred among an ensemble in Anurag Basu's spiritual sequel Metro... In Dino. She portrayed a woman who is torn between commitment to her fiancé and her growing feelings for another man (played by Aditya Roy Kapur). News18's Titas Chowdhury reviewed: "Sara understand the assignment and portrays the grit and emotional fog of her character remarkably". The film emerged as a moderate commercial success.

Khan started 2026 with Mudassar Aziz's romantic comedy Pati Patni Aur Woh Do. She played one of two women with whom a married man (played by Ayushmann Khurrana) is suspected of having an affair. India Today's Vineeta Kumar found Khan to possess a "noticeable comfort in her performance" that had been absent from her earlier films. The film proved to be a box-office failure. Khan played a Defence Ministry member in her second release of the year, Aakash Kaushik's spy comedy Udta Teer, where she reunited with Khurrana. Rishab Suri and Jaya Dwivedie felt Khan plays her part "adequately" but were critical of her character development in the film.

== Other work and media image ==
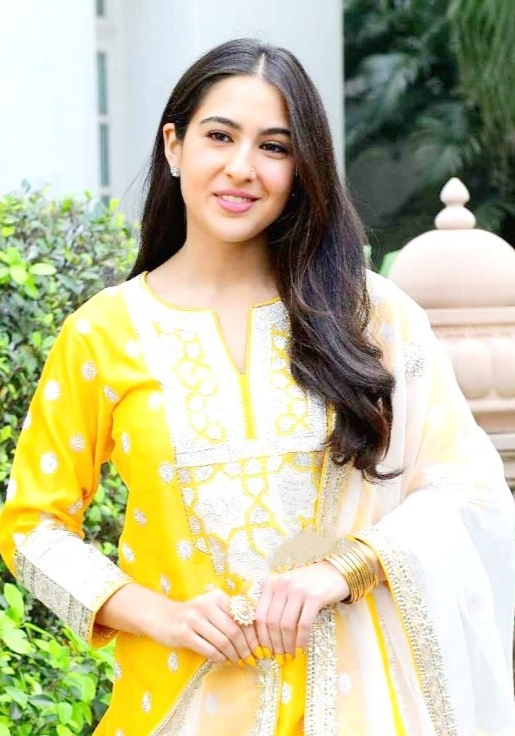
Khan in 2021

In 2019, Khan appeared in Forbes India's Celebrity 100 list. She was placed 66th with an estimated annual income of ₹57.5 million (US$610,000). In 2020, Eastern Eye featured her in their dynamic dozen for the decade list. In Rediff.com's "The Best Actresses" list of 2021, she was placed 9th. She was later placed 7th in GQ India's listing of the 30 most influential young Indians of 2022. Khan has frequently featured in Times 50 Most Desirable Women list. She was placed 30th in 2018, 27th in 2019 and 24th in 2020.

Khan is a celebrity endorser for several brands and products, including Fanta, Puma, Pepsi, Veet and Kurkure. In 2022, she joined The Souled Store, a pop-culture apparel brand, as an equity partner. Apart from acting, Khan supports a number of causes. During COVID-19 pandemic, Khan donated to Sonu Sood's Foundation for purchasing oxygen cylinders for those in need. In 2021, on her birthday, she teamed up with Kailash Sathyarthi Children's Foundation, for providing help to children who have been orphaned due to COVID-19.

Khan is known for visiting Hindu temples and engaging in rituals and prayers, particularly at the Kedarnath Temple. These visits have often drawn public attention and discussion.

== Filmography ==
Key
†	Denotes films that have not yet been released

Year	Title	Role	Notes	Ref.
2018	Kedarnath	Mandakani "Mukku" Mishra		
2018	Simmba	Shagun Sathe		
2020	Love Aaj Kal	Zoe Chauhan		
2020	Coolie No. 1	Sarah Rozario		
2021	Atrangi Re	Rinku / Manjari Sooryavanshi (Note: Khan played dual roles in the film.)		
2023	Gaslight	Meesha Singh Gaikwad / Fatima (Note: Khan played a single character with two or more names.)		
2023	Zara Hatke Zara Bachke	Somya Chawla Dubey		
2023	Rocky Aur Rani Kii Prem Kahaani	Herself	Special appearance in song "Heart Throb"	
2024	Murder Mubarak	Bambi Todi		
2024	Ae Watan Mere Watan	Usha Mehta		
2025	Sky Force	Geeta Vijaya		
2025	Metro... In Dino	Chumki		
2026	Pati Patni Aur Woh Do	Chanchal Kumari		
2026	Udta Teer	Yamini		

== Awards and nominations ==
Year	Award	Category	Work	Result	Ref.
2019	Filmfare Awards	Best Female Debut	Kedarnath	Won	
2019	Screen Awards	Best Female Debut	Kedarnath	Won	
2019	IIFA Awards	Star Debut of the Year – Female	Kedarnath	Won	
2019	Zee Cine Awards	Best Female Debut	Kedarnath	Nominated	
2019	Vogue Beauty Awards	Fresh Face - Female	—N/a	Won	
2019	GQ Awards	Breakthrough Talent	Kedarnath & Simmba	Won	
2019	Nickelodeon Kids' Choice Awards	Rising Star Award	—N/a	Won	
2021	Lokmat Stylish Awards	Most Stylish Youth Icon	—N/a	Won	
2022	Nickelodeon Kids' Choice Awards	Favourite Fashion Icon	—N/a	Won	
2022	Indian Television Academy Awards	Best Actress in an Original Film	Atrangi Re	Nominated	
2022	Pinkvilla Style Icons Awards	Super Stylish Actor Female (Popular Choice)	—N/a	Won	
2023	Bollywood Hungama OTT India Fest	Best Actor Female Popular – Original Film	Gaslight	Nominated	
2023	Bollywood Hungama Style Icons	Most Stylish Actor (Female)	—N/a	Nominated	
2023	Bollywood Hungama Style Icons	Most Stylish Actor People's Choice (Female)	—N/a	Nominated	
2023	Bollywood Hungama Style Icons	Most Stylish Youth Icon (Female)	—N/a	Nominated	
2024	Bollywood Hungama Style Icons	Most Stylish Classic Beauty of the Year	—N/a	Nominated	
2024	Bollywood Hungama Style Icons	Most Stylish Leading Entertainer of the Year (Female)	—N/a	Nominated	
2025	Bollywood Hungama OTT India Fest	Actor of the Year – (Female)	Metro In Dino	Nominated	
