= The Perils of Being Moderately Famous =

2017 memoir by Soha Ali Khan

- Author: Soha Ali Khan
- Publisher: Penguin India
- Publication date: December 12, 2017
- Pages: 256
- ISBN: 9780143439967

The Perils of Being Moderately Famous is a memoir by Soha Ali Khan published on 12 December 2017 by Penguin India.

== Reception ==
Joginder Tuteja of Bollywood Hungama described The Perils of Being Moderately Famous as "an easy and lazy weekend read". Business Standard's Manavi Kapur similarly called it "an easy read".

The book has been also reviewed by Nisha Ghatak, and Ishita Sengupta of The Indian Express.

The Perils of Being Moderately Famous won the 2018 Crossword Book Award for Biography.
