= Iftikhar Ali Khan Pataudi =

Mohammad Iftikhar Ali Khan of Pataudi
- Nawab of Pataudi
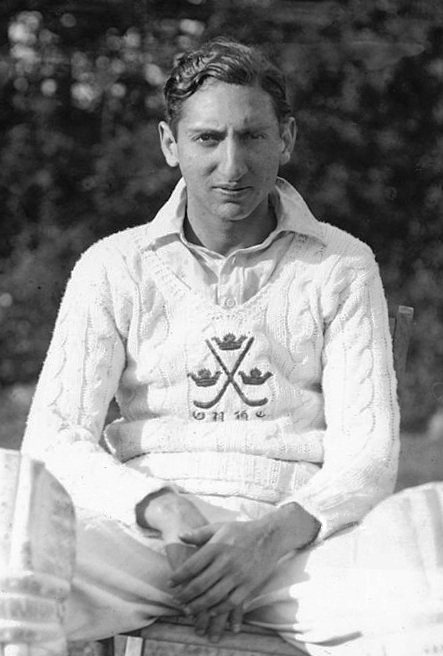
- Iftikhar Ali Khan Pataudi in 1931

Nawab of Pataudi
- Reign: 1917–1948; 1948–1952 (titular ruler)
- Coronation: December 1931
- Predecessor: Muhammad Ibrahim Ali Khan Pataudi
- Successor: Mansoor Ali Khan (as titular ruler)
- Born: Mohammad Iftikhar Ali Khan Pataudi; 16 March 1910; Pataudi, British India
- Died: 5 January 1952 (aged 41); New Delhi, India
- Burial: Pataudi, Haryana, India
- Consort: Sajida Sultan (m. 1939)
- Issue: 4 (inc. Mansoor Ali Khan)
- House: Pataudi
- Religion: Sunni Islam
- Occupation: Cricketer, civil servant
- Cricket career

Personal information
- Nickname: Pat
- Height: 6 ft 0 in (1.83 m)
- Batting: Right-handed

International information
- National sides: England (1932–1934); India (1946)
- Test debut (cap 265/32): 2 December 1932; England v Australia
- Last Test: 20 August 1946; India v England

Domestic team information
- Years: Team
- 1928–1931: Oxford University
- 1932–1938: Worcestershire
- 1945/46: Southern Punjab

Career statistics
Competition	Test	First-class
Matches	6	127
Runs scored	199	8,750
Batting average	19.90	48.61
100s/50s	1/0	29/34
Top score	102	238*
Balls bowled	0	756
Wickets	–	15
Bowling average	–	35.26
5 wickets in innings	–	1
10 wickets in match	–	0
Best bowling	–	6/111
Catches/stumpings	0/–	58/–
- Source: ESPNcricinfo, 12 May 2009

Nawab Mohammad Iftikhar Ali Khan Pataudi, sometimes I. A. K. Pataudi (16 March 1910 – 5 January 1952), was an Indian prince and cricket player.

He was the captain of the India's national cricket team during its tour of England in 1946. His son Mansoor also later served as captain of the India cricket team.

He also played Test cricket for the England team in 1932 and 1934, making him one of the few cricketers to have played Test cricket for two countries and the only Test cricketer to have played for both India and England. He played in six Tests in all, three as captain of India and three for England.

Pataudi was the ruling Nawab of the princely state of Pataudi during the British Raj from 1917 until 1947. After the state was absorbed into independent India, he was granted a privy purse, certain privileges, and the use of the title Nawab of Pataudi by the Government of India, which he retained until his death in 1952.

== Personal life ==
=== Early life and family ===
Iftikhar Ali Khan was born at the Pataudi House into the family of the Nawabs of Pataudi, a small (137 square kilometres (53 sq mi)) non-salute princely state near Delhi, located in the present-day Gurugram district of the Indian state of Haryana. The Pataudi family traces their origin to Faiz Talab Khan, an ethnic Pashtun of the Barech tribe, from Kandahar, Afghanistan, who became the first Nawab of the Pataudi State in 1804.

Iftikhar Ali Khan was the elder son of Nawab Muhammad Ibrahim Ali Khan of Pataudi and his wife Shahar Bano Begum, daughter of Amiruddin Ahmad Khan, the Nawab of Loharu. Thus, he was related to the great Urdu poet Mirza Ghalib as well as later day Pakistan prime minister, Liaqat Ali Khan. His brother, Sher Ali Khan Pataudi and nephew, Isfandiyar Ali Khan Pataudi, both served as a Major Generals in the Pakistan Army. His sister Begum Abida Sultana's son, Ashiq Hussain Qureshi, was a cricketer and civil servant in Pakistan. He became Nawab on his father's death in 1917 and was formally appointed ruler in December 1931. His state became part of the newly independent India in 1948. After Indian independence, he was employed in the Indian Foreign Office until his death.

=== Education and marriage ===
Educated at Chiefs' College (later renamed Aitchison College) in Lahore, and at Balliol College, Oxford, Iftikhar married Begum Sajida Sultan, second daughter of Hamidullah Khan, last ruling Nawab of Bhopal, in 1939.

Hamidullah Khan was to have been succeeded in the titles and privileges associated with the ruling house of Bhopal by his eldest daughter Abida Sultan. She emigrated to Pakistan in the aftermath of the partition of India. His voluntary accession of his state to India by going to Delhi has been recounted in V P Menon's book The story of Integration of Indian States. V P Menon remembered him as "Great Patriot who unfortunately died young". Sajida therefore succeeded her father and was recognised by the government of India as Begum of Bhopal in 1961. Upon her demise in 1995, her son Mansoor succeeded to the estates and titles associated with the Nawabs of Bhopal.

The couple had four children together, a son, Mansoor Ali Khan Pataudi, and three daughters, Saleha Sultan, Qudsia Sultan and Sabiha Sultan.

== Cricketing career ==
Iftikhar Ali Khan was coached at school in India by Oxford cricketer M. G. Slater and then in England by Frank Woolley. He went to Oxford in 1927. It was two years before he won a blue; this was for a 106 and 84 that saved a match against Cambridge. In the 1931 season, he scored 1,307 runs for Oxford and finished with a batting average of 93, heading the Oxford averages. In the University Match that year, Alan Ratcliffe scored 201 for Cambridge, a new record. Pataudi declared that he would beat it, and hit 238* on the very next day. This stood as a record for the University Match until 2005. Pataudi qualified to play for Worcestershire in 1932 but played only three matches and scored just 65 runs in six innings. However, his slaughter of Tich Freeman with marvellous footwork during an innings of 165 for the Gentlemen at Lord's in July 1932 gained him a place on the Ashes tour for that winter. He was selected as a Wisden Cricketer of the Year in 1932.

=== Selection for First Test match ===
He was selected for the first Test of the 1932–33 Ashes series, Pataudi followed in the footsteps of Ranjitsinhji by scoring a century (102) on his Test debut in Sydney, which England won by 10 wickets. He nonetheless incurred the ire of his captain Douglas Jardine by dissenting against Jardine's bodyline tactics. Upon Pataudi's refusal to take his place in a bodyline leg-side field, Jardine retorted, "I see His Highness is a conscientious objector." He was dropped after the second Test in Melbourne, in which he scored 15 and 5, and did not play again that series.

It is said that Jardine told him he would never play for his "adopted country" again, presumably a comment with racial implications (since Jardine himself had been born in India, and was of Scottish parentage, England was his "adopted country" also). Pataudi did play one further time for England and, towards the end of the 1932-33 tour, he said of Jardine: "I am told he has his good points. In three months I have yet to see them."

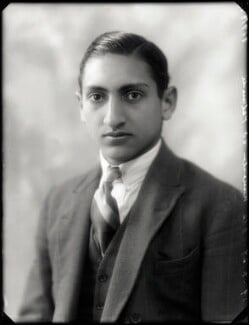
Pataudi in 1929, at Oxford

1933 was Pataudi's only full season of county cricket, and he batted marvelously, again slaughtering Freeman at Worcester and scoring two other double-hundreds. He finished with 1749 runs at an average of 49, but after more brilliant batting early in 1934 his health broke down and he played just ten games, although recording a batting average of 91.33. He played in his third and last Test for England in June 1934, against Australia at Trent Bridge, scoring 12 and 10. Pataudi did not play at all in 1935 and 1936 and only five times altogether in 1937 and 1938. Nonetheless, in these games, he batted so well that Worcestershire, weak in batting, were always regretting he could not play more often.

He has been considered as a possible captain for the India team in its first Test match in 1932, at Lord's, but withdrew his name from consideration. He was appointed captain for the India tour of England in 1936, but withdrew at the last moment, ostensibly on health grounds. He finally played for India when he captained the tour to England in 1946. Despite averaging 46.71 on the tour, he scored only 55 runs in 5 Test innings, and his captaincy was also criticized. He was Indian Cricketer of the Year in 1946/47. He planned a return to play for Worcestershire for the 1952 county cricket season but died in India before he came back.

Iftikhar Ali Khan was also a fine hockey and billiards player and an accomplished speaker. In 2007, in commemoration of the 75th anniversary of India's Test debut, the Marylebone Cricket Club commissioned a trophy in Pataudi's name, to be competed for in the Test series between India and England.

== Death and legacy ==
Iftikhar died in Delhi of a heart attack while playing polo on 5 January 1952, coincidentally his son's Mansoor Ali Khan's eleventh birthday. That son succeeded him as the 9th Nawab of Pataudi, and later also served as captain of the Indian cricket team. Iftikhar was also the grandfather of Bollywood actors Saif Ali Khan and Soha Ali Khan, and cricketer Saad Bin Jung.

== See also ==
- Nawab of Pataudi
- List of cricketers who have played for more than one international team

Preceded by Maharajkumar of Vizianagram	Indian National Test Cricket Captain; 1946	Succeeded by Lala Amarnath
Preceded by Nawab Muhammad Ibrahim Ali Khan	Nawab of Pataudi; 1917–1952	Succeeded by Nawab Mansoor Ali Khan
