= Shahryar Khan =

Pakistan diplomat (1934–2024)

Nawabzada Shahryar Khan
- شہریار محمد خان
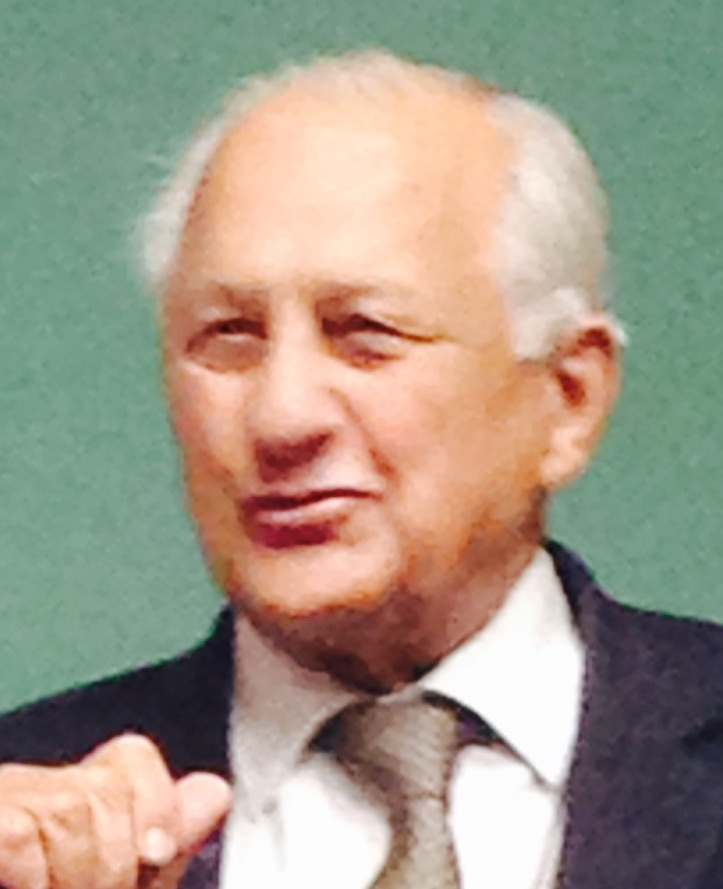

Chairman of Pakistan Cricket Board
- In office May 2014 – August 2017
- Preceded by: Najam Sethi
- Succeeded by: Najam Sethi
- In office December 2003 – October 2006
- Preceded by: Lieutenant general Tauqir Zia
- Succeeded by: Nasim Ashraf

20th Foreign Secretary of Pakistan
- In office 1990–1994
- Preceded by: Tanvir Ahmad Khan
- Succeeded by: Najmuddin Shaikh

Personal details
- Born: 29 March 1934 Bhopal, Bhopal State, British India
- Died: 23 March 2024 (aged 89) Lahore, Punjab, Pakistan
- Spouse: Minoo Khan (m. 1958)
- Parent(s): Sarwar Ali Khan; Abida Sultan
- Education: Daly College; Oundle School; The Fletcher School; University of Cambridge
- Occupation: Diplomat

Shahryar Mohammad Khan (Urdu: شہریار محمد خان; 29 March 1934 – 23 March 2024) was a Pakistani career diplomat who became Foreign Secretary of Pakistan in 1990, and remained so until his retirement from service in 1994. He later served as United Nations Special Representative of the Secretary-General to Rwanda (1994–1996), and wrote the book Shallow Graves of Rwanda on his experiences on what Rwanda went through. From August 1999, he intermittently served as the chairman of the Pakistan Cricket Board, and also served as the president of the Asian Cricket Council in 2016.

== Early life and background ==
Shahryar Muhammed Khan was born on 29 March 1934 in the Qasr-e-Sultani Palace (now Saifia College), in Bhopal State (honoured with 19-gun salute until 1947) in British India. He was the only son and male heir of both Nawab Muhammad Sarwar Ali Khan, the ruler of former princely state of Kurwai and Princess Begum Abida Sultan (Suraya Jah, and Nawab Gauhar-i-Taj), herself the Crown Princess and the eldest daughter of the last ruling Nawab of Bhopal, Haji-Hafiz Sir Muhammad Nawab Hamidullah Khan, who reigned over the state of Bhopal after a prolonged era of the Begums regime (the queens), and his wife Begum Maimoona Sultan. Khan is descended from the royal family of former princely state of Bhopal where his settler colonialist ancestors had emigrated during first quarter of the eighteenth century from Afghanistan.

== Career, retirement and literary work ==
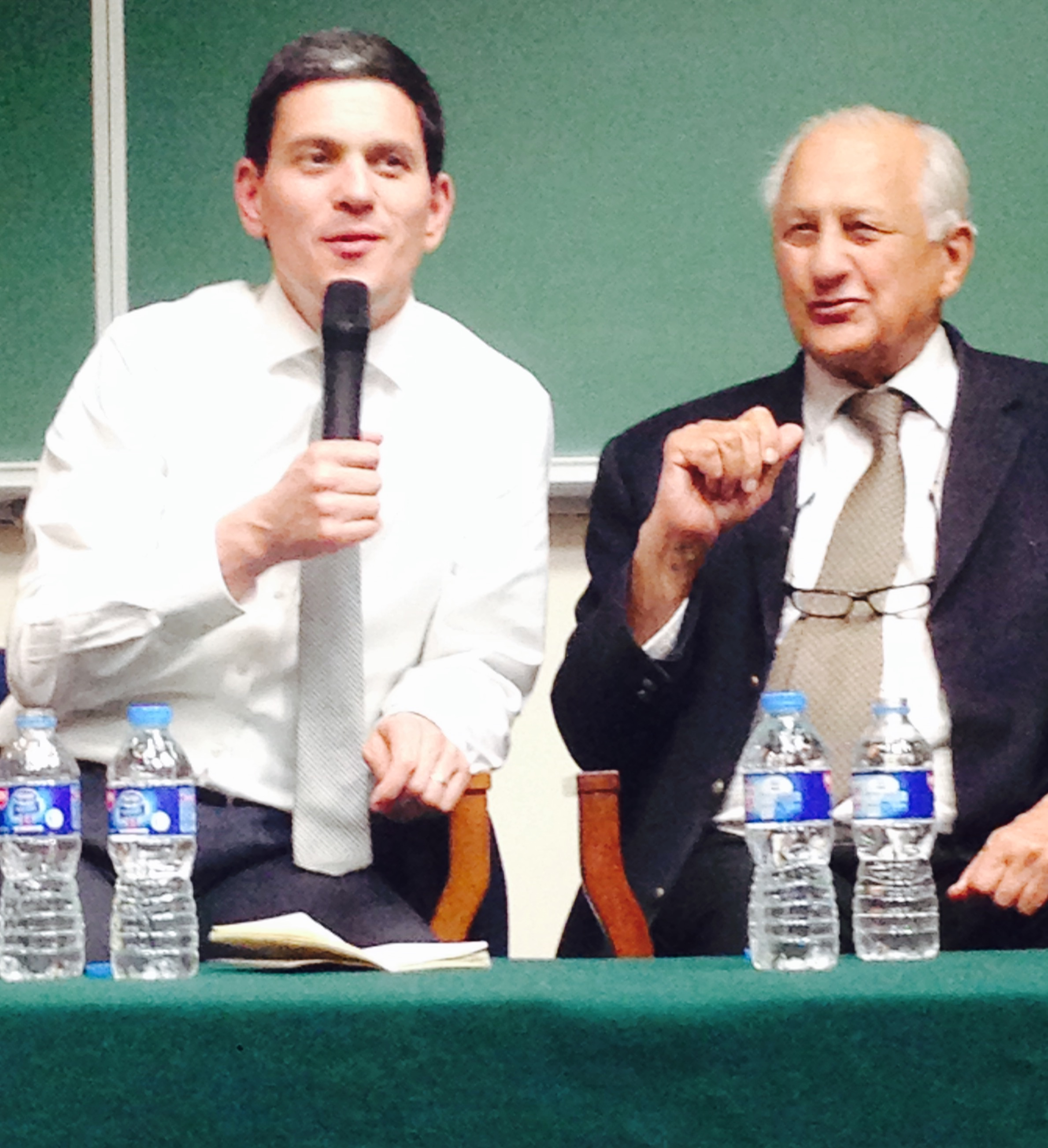
Khan (right) with David Miliband at LUMS in 2014

He worked for a year with Burmah Shell Oil, and in 1957, joined the Pakistani foreign service. In 1960, he was posted as a Third Secretary in the Pakistani High Commission in London, and was promoted to Second Secretary in the Tunis embassy from 1962 to 1966. In 1976, Shahryar Khan became Pakistan's ambassador to Jordan (1976–1982) and the United Kingdom (1987–1990). He also stayed as Pakistan's Ambassador to France (1999–2001) and chairman, Committee on Foreign Service Reforms, Ministry of Foreign Affairs (1997–1999).

Khan was teaching Pakistan's Foreign Relations at the Lahore University of Management Sciences (LUMS) as part of the Humanities and Social Sciences faculty. He taught a course titled "Pakistan's Foreign Relations" in the Fall semester and a senior-level course titled "Critical Issues in Pakistan's Foreign Relations" in the Spring semester. At LUMS, he was also the patron of the LUMS Model UN Society (LUMUN).

On 1 July 1994, he was appointed United Nations Secretary-General Boutros Boutros-Ghali's Special Representative to Rwanda, succeeding Jacques-Roger Booh-Booh. As U.N. Special Representative, he represented the United Nations during the genocide and subsequent refugee crisis.

In 2005, he was made an honorary fellow of Corpus Christi College, Cambridge.

In his retirement, Shahryar Khan wrote a number of books. The Begums of Bhopal is a history of the princely state of Bhopal. The Shallow Graves of Rwanda is an eye-witness account of his two-year stay in a country ravaged by genocide. Cricket – a Bridge of Peace, about India-Pakistan relations, is his third book. His most personal book was the biography of his mother Princess Abida Sultaan – Memoirs of a Rebel Princess, which has been translated into Urdu. In 2013, with his son Ali Khan, he wrote Cricket Cauldron: The Turbulent Politics of Sport in Pakistan. He also co-authored Shadows Across the Playing Field: 60 Years of India-Pakistan Cricket (2009) with Indian writer and politician Shashi Tharoor.

== Chairman Pakistan Cricket Board ==
Khan served as the chairman of the Pakistan Cricket Board (PCB) from 10 December 2003 till he resigned on 7 October 2006. In 2003, took over the board in turmoil. His tenure is remembered more for Pakistan's 2006 forfeit of the Oval test after being penalised for ball tampering.

On 16 August 2014, he was again appointed the chairman of the PCB. Khan was appointed chairman after he was elected unanimously by the board of governors of the Pakistan Cricket Board in the light of the new constitution of the PCB 2014 which was approved by the Prime Minister of Pakistan. He was once again appointed the chairman of the Pakistan Cricket Board on 18 August 2014. In September 2015, he launched the Pakistan Super League. He retired from the position in 2017 after completing his term.

In March 2016, Pakistan was eliminated from the 2016 ICC World Twenty20 after losing three matches against India, New Zealand and Australia and only winning against Bangladesh. This caused great controversy over whose 'fault' it was. Khan was amongst those blamed and there were talks about him retiring from the PCB after this. However, he later spoke out and said he would not resign. He also said it would be better to bring in a foreign coach, implying that Waqar Younis's coaching contract, which ended in June 2016, would not be renewed. Furthermore, Khan did not release any statements on who he thought was responsible for the loss, but instead, he said before the match that he would not change Afridi's position because he had been 'serving Pakistan for the last 20 years'. Khan added that changes would happen after the tournament but also noted that the poor performance was from the whole team, except certain individuals.

== Personal life and death ==
Khan met Minoo Khan, a student at the Queen's College in London in 1957, and married her in 1958 in Karachi.

Shahryar Khan died on 23 March 2024 in Lahore, at the age of 89. He was buried in Bhopal House in Malir, Karachi.

== See also ==
- Foreign relations of Pakistan

Diplomatic posts
Preceded by ??	Pakistan High Commissioner to the United Kingdom; 1987–1990	Succeeded by Humayun Khan
Preceded by Tanvir Ahmad Khan	Foreign Secretary of Pakistan; 1990–1994	Succeeded by Najmuddin Shaikh
