= Abida Sultan =

Princess Suraya Jah, Nawab Gowhar-i-Taj (1913–2002)

Abida Sultan Begum
- Princess Suraya Jah, Nawab Gowhar-i-Taj
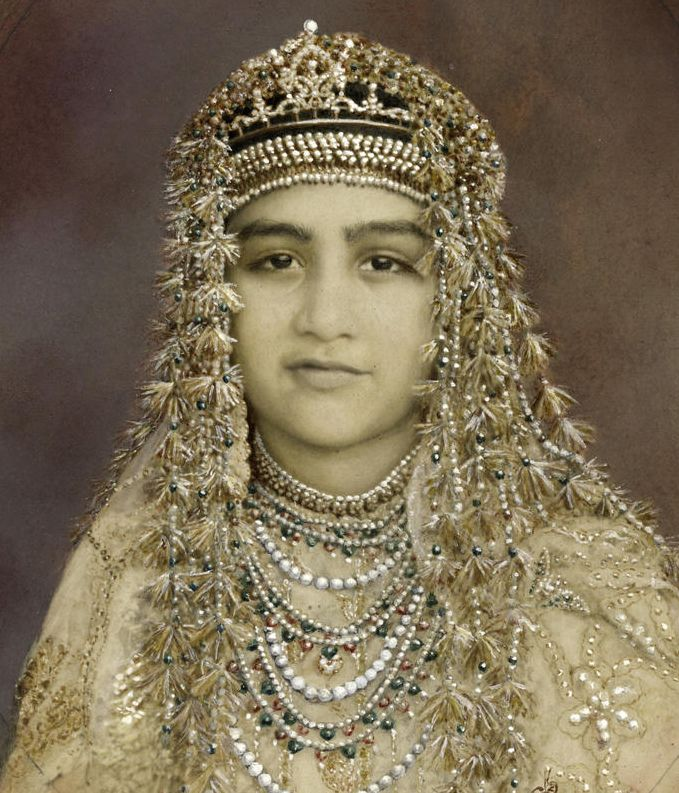
- Born: 28 August 1913; Bhopal, Bhopal State, British India
- Died: 11 May 2002 (aged 88); Malir, Karachi, Sindh, Pakistan
- Burial: Karachi, Sindh, Pakistan
- Spouse: Mohammad Sarwar Ali Khan
- Issue: Shahryar Khan
- House: Nawab of Bhopal
- Father: Hamidullah Khan
- Mother: Maimoona Sultan

Princess Suraya Jah, Nawab Gowhar-i-Taj (born Abida Sultan Begum Sahiba; 28 August 1913 – 11 May 2002), also known as Abida Sultaan, was the eldest daughter of Hamidullah Khan, the last Nawab of the Bhopal state, and his wife Begum Maimoona Sultan.

== Early life and royal family ==
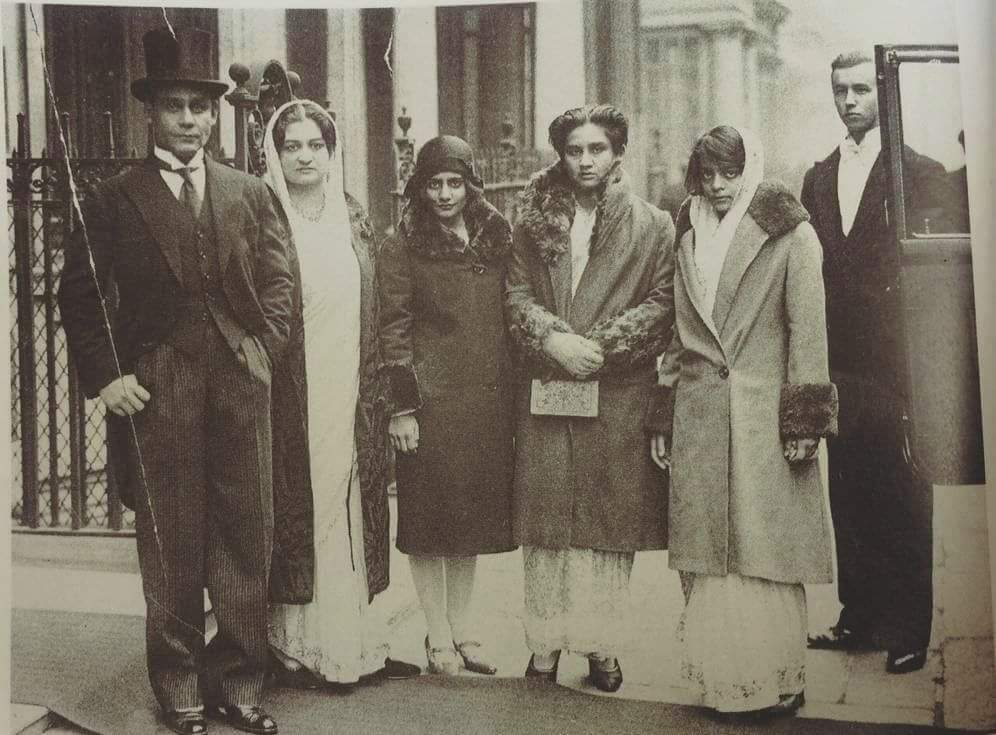
Bhopal royal family. L to R: Nawab Hamidullah Khan, his wife Maimoona Sultan, their daughters – Rabia Sultan, Abida Sultan, Sajida Sultan, in London, 1932

Abida Sultan Begum Sahiba (begum being a Muslim woman of high rank) was born on 28 August 1913, the daughter of Hamidullah Khan, the Nawab of Bhopal and Begum Maimoona Sultan. She was the eldest of three children; she had two younger sisters Sajida Sultan and Rabia Sultan.

The Begum of Bhopal, Sultan Jahan, was her grandmother, and her predecessor Shah Jahan Begum was her great-grandmother. Her grandmother brought her up, and her own mother "had nothing to do with [her]". Her grandmother, who was nearly 70 when Abida was born, brought her up very strictly in the Islamic tradition. She had to rise at 4am to read the Quran, and had to do menial duties such as sweeping the floor. She was also allowed to do all the same activities as the boys did, including sports, music, and horse riding.

From the age of nine, Abida drove a Rolls-Royce.

She was also known as Abida Sultaan.

== Marriage and governing ==
In 1926, at the age of 12, she was forced to get into an arranged marriage by her grandmother nicknamed Sarkar Amman, which was the normal custom at the time for Muslim females, with Nawab Mohammad Sarwar Ali Khan, the ruler of neighboring Kurwai State, who was a childhood friend. This marriage lasted for 9 years and the married life was not easy due to her young age. After the collapse of her marriage, Abida moved back to her home state, Bhopal. The married couple together had a son Shahryar Khan who was later brought up by Abida as a single mother.

She had been completely unprepared for her wedding day, and her marriage broke up after around 9 years. She later wrote that she had not realized that the consummation of her marriage would leave her "so horrified, numbed and feeling unchaste". She moved back to Bhopal, and an ugly custody dispute over the couple's son, Shaharyar Khan, ensued. In March 1935, she drove for hours to the home of her ex-husband, gave him a gun and said that if he did not shoot her, she would shoot him.

In 1928, at the age of 15, she was recognised as the heiress apparent to the Bhopal throne. She then managed her father's cabinet from 1935 until 1949, when Bhopal was merged with the state of Madhya Pradesh. During this time, Abida attended some round-table conferences which were held in London and called by the British government. During those conferences, she met Mahatma Gandhi, Motilal Nehru, and his son, Jawaharlal Nehru, first prime minister of India.

== Move to Pakistan ==
After the partition of India in 1947, she experienced discrimination, and witnessed violence between Hindus and Muslims. She gave up her right to the throne and in 1950 emigrated to the newly-formed Pakistan, aged 37, with her young son.

In Pakistan, she joined the foreign service; the government of India responded by excluding her from the line of succession. Her younger sister Sajida succeeded her instead upon her father's death in 1960, despite Abida Sultan contesting the succession in court.

She spent the greater part of her life in Malir District in Karachi, Pakistan.

== Death ==
Sultan died in Karachi in 2002. Her son, Shaharyar Khan, became the Foreign Secretary of Pakistan and later the chairman of the Pakistan Cricket Board.

== Personal life ==
The cricketer Iftikhar Ali Khan Pataudi was her brother-in-law through his marriage to Sajida, and the cricketer Mansoor Ali Khan Pataudi is her nephew.

During her life, she flew aeroplanes, played polo, and wore her hair short.

She wrote an autobiography, Memoirs of a Rebel Princess, which was published posthumously in 2004.
