= Pataudi State =

Princely state in India

Coordinates: 28.32°N 76.78°E

- Princely State
- 1804–1948
- Flag

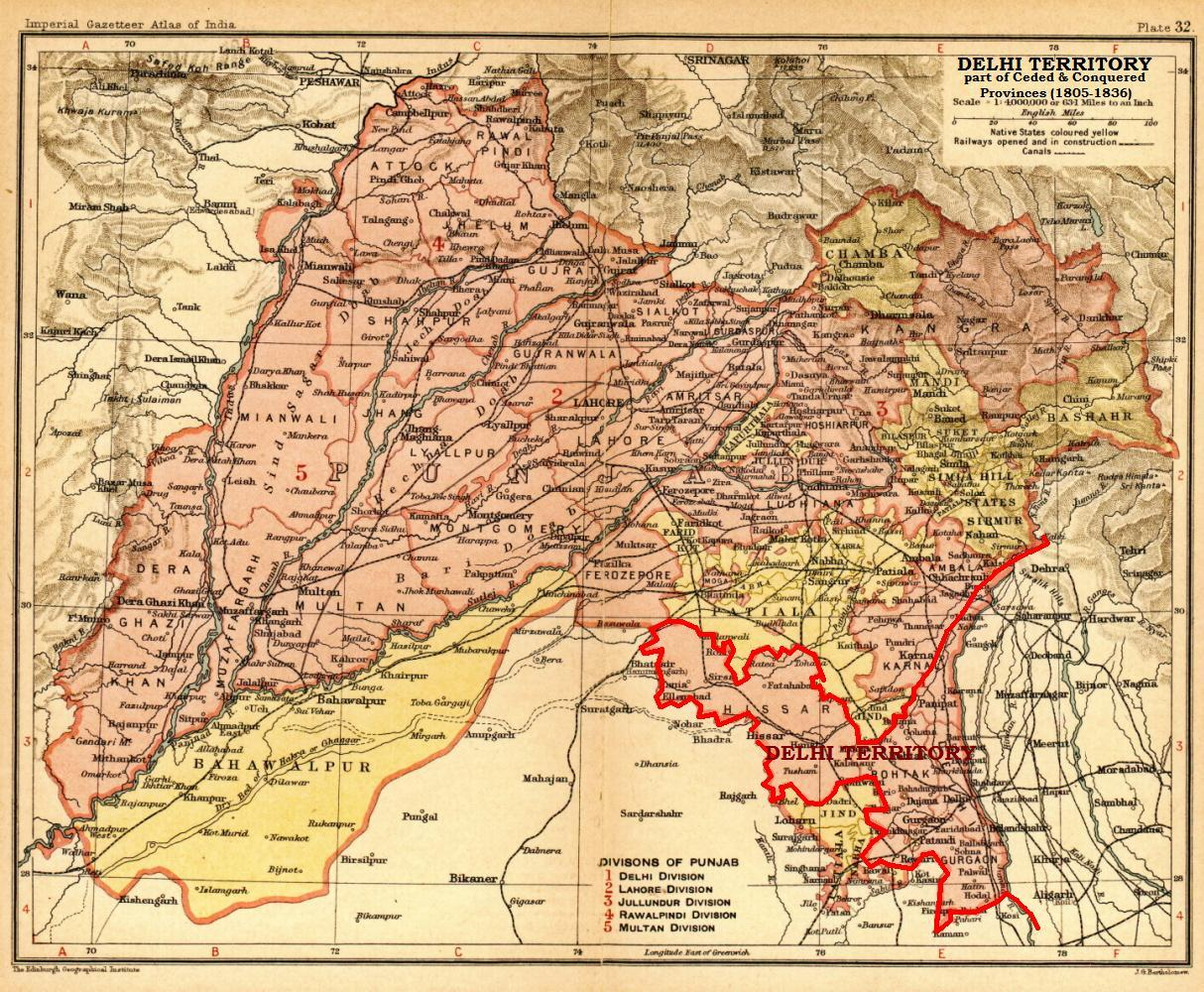
- Pataudi shown in Delhi Territory, south of Gurgaon, Imperial Gazetteer of India, 1908
- Area
  - 1901: 135 km^{2} (52 sq mi)
- Population
  - 1901: 21,933
- History
  - Established: 1804
  - Accession to the Union of India: 1948
| Preceded by | Succeeded by |
| Maratha Empire | India |

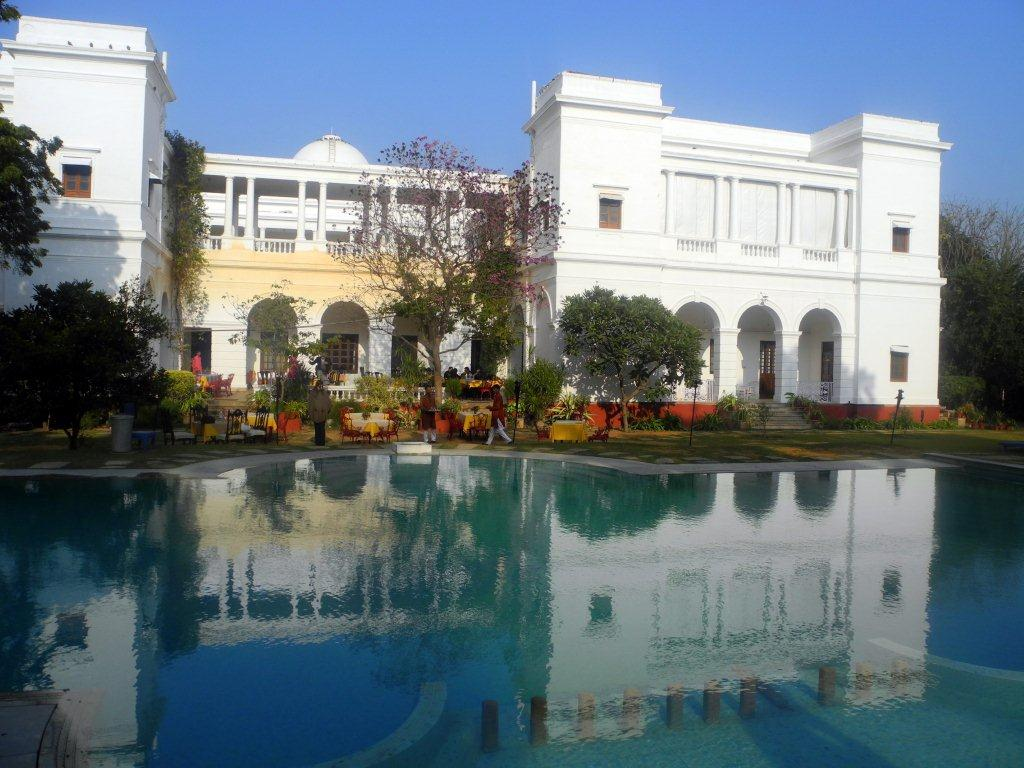
View of Pataudi Palace.

Pataudi State was a small princely state in India, established in 1804 by the East India Company rule in India.

The state formed a part of the Delhi Territory in the Ceded and Conquered Provinces. It was under the suzerainty of the Commissioner of Delhi. It had an area of 52 square miles and included one town, Pataudi, which was its capital, and 40 villages, ruled by the Pataudi family.

== History ==
The ruling family traces their origin from a saintly Afghan family, which initially settled near Samana in Patiala in 16th century, during the period of the Lodi dynasty.

A descendant, Faiz Talab Khan, an Afghan Pashtun warlord of the Barech tribe, who was closly connected with Jhajjar ruling family by marriage was in service with the Maratha Empire and also received the fief of Rohtak. However after the defeat of the Marathas in 1803, he was subsequently employed under the British general, Lord Lake. Subsequently, he aided the East Indian Company Forces in their battle against the Maratha Empire during the Second Anglo-Maratha War. He was also severely injured during the war, thereafter in 1806, in recognition of his services, he was awarded a land grant of perpetual jagir comprising 40 villages, from Lord Lake, and thus became the first Nawab of Pataudi state.. Faiz Talab Khan in 1806, he took part in the Siege of Bharatpur by the British East India Company forces. His son, Akbar Ali was loyal to the British forces during Indian Rebellion of 1857.

Pataudi town the capital of Pataudi State was founded in 13th-century, the time of Jalaluddin Khilji, Sultan of Delhi (r. 1290 – 1296 CE), by a Mewati named Pata, from whom the town derives its name. By 1901, it has a population of 4171.

The 8th Nawab, Iftikhar Ali Khan Pataudi, played cricket for both England and India and captained the latter. His son the last Nawab also captained the Indian cricket team.

At the end of the British Raj and with the political integration of India in 1948, the princely state of Pataudi was absorbed into the new Dominion of India (later Republic of India). In 1971, by virtue of the 26th amendment to the Constitution of India, the Government of India abolished all official symbols of princely India, including titles, privileges, and remuneration (privy purses).

The former Pataudi Palace was a hotel for some time, but is now owned privately by Saif Ali Khan, the current patriarch of the Pataudi family.

== Rulers ==
Rulers bore the title of the Nawab.

- Faiz Talab Khan (r. 1804–1829)
- Akbar Ali Khan (r. 1829–1862)
- Mohammad Taqi Ali Khan (r. 1862–1867)
- Mohammad Mukhtar Husain Khan (r. 1867–1878)
- Mohammad Mumtaz Husain Ali Khan (r. 1878–1898)
- Mohammad Muzaffar Ali Khan (r. 1898–1913)
- Mohammad Ibrahim Ali Khan (r. 1913–1917)
- Mohammad Iftikhar Ali Khan (r. 1917–1948; titular 1948–1952)
- Mohammad Mansoor Ali Khan (1952–1971) (Title abolished in 1971).

== Demographics ==
Religious groups in Pataudi State (British Punjab province era)
| Religious group | 1881 | | 1891 | | 1901 | | 1911 | | 1921 | | 1931 | | 1941 | |
| Religious group | Pop. | % | Pop. | % | Pop. | % | Pop. | % | Pop. | % | Pop. | % | Pop. | % |
|---|---|---|---|---|---|---|---|---|---|---|---|---|---|---|
| Hinduism (Note: 1931-1941: Including Ad-Dharmis) | 14,473 | 81.09% | 15,825 | 83.28% | 18,281 | 83.35% | 16,114 | 82.45% | 15,090 | 83.38% | 15,596 | 82.64% | 17,728 | 82.38% |
| Islam | 3,286 | 18.41% | 3,057 | 16.09% | 3,549 | 16.18% | 3,338 | 17.08% | 2,898 | 16.01% | 3,168 | 16.79% | 3,655 | 16.98% |
| Jainism | 81 | 0.45% | 120 | 0.63% | 103 | 0.47% | 82 | 0.42% | 109 | 0.6% | 105 | 0.56% | 128 | 0.59% |
| Christianity | 7 | 0.04% | 0 | 0% | 0 | 0% | 9 | 0.05% | 0 | 0% | 3 | 0.02% | 9 | 0.04% |
| Sikhism | 0 | 0% | 0 | 0% | 0 | 0% | 0 | 0% | 0 | 0% | 1 | 0.01% | 0 | 0% |
| Zoroastrianism | 0 | 0% | 0 | 0% | 0 | 0% | 0 | 0% | 0 | 0% | 0 | 0% | 0 | 0% |
| Buddhism | 0 | 0% | 0 | 0% | 0 | 0% | 0 | 0% | 0 | 0% | 0 | 0% | 0 | 0% |
| Judaism | —N/a | —N/a | 0 | 0% | 0 | 0% | 0 | 0% | 0 | 0% | 0 | 0% | 0 | 0% |
| Others | 0 | 0% | 0 | 0% | 0 | 0% | 0 | 0% | 0 | 0% | 0 | 0% | 0 | 0% |
| Total population | 17,847 | 100% | 19,002 | 100% | 21,933 | 100% | 19,543 | 100% | 18,097 | 100% | 18,873 | 100% | 21,520 | 100% |
Note: British Punjab province era district borders are not an exact match in the present-day due to various bifurcations to district borders — which since created new districts — throughout the historic Punjab Province region during the post-independence era that have taken into account population increases.

== See also ==
- Political integration of India
- Afghan diaspora
- Nawab of Pataudi
