= Hamidullah Khan =

Nawab Sir Hamidullah Khan Orakzai
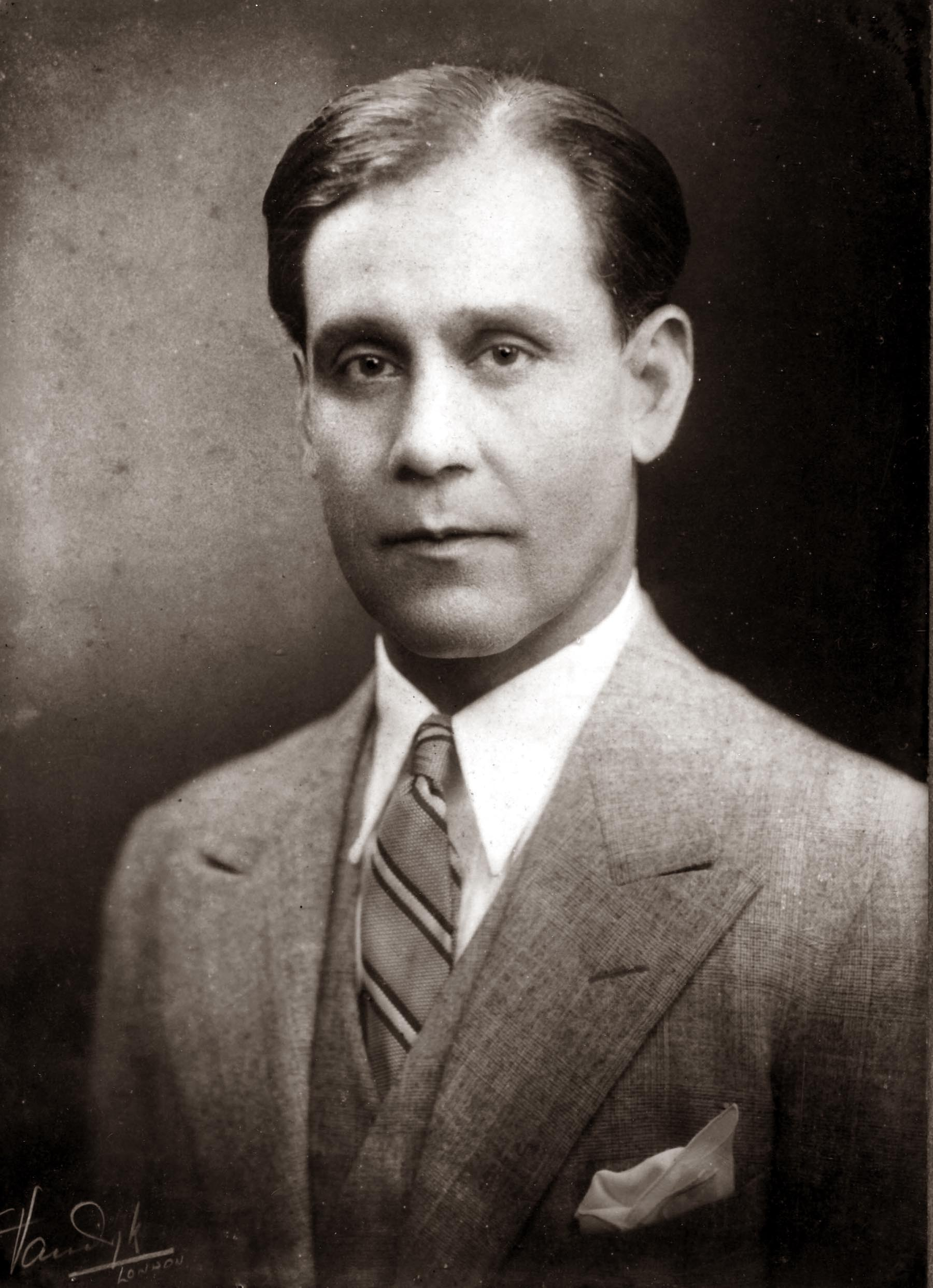
- Portrait by Carl Vandyk

Nawab of Bhopal
- Reign: 20 April 1926 – 1 June 1949
- Coronation: 9 June 1926
- Predecessor: Kaikhusrau Jahan
- Successor: Monarchy abolished, Bhopal State created.

Titular Nawab of Bhopal
- Titular monarch: 1 June 1949 – 4 February 1960
- Successor: Sajida Sultan
- Born: 9 September 1894
- Died: 4 February 1960 (aged 65)
- Mother: Kaikhusrau Jahan
- Military career
- Allegiance: Bhopal State
- Service years: 1926 - 1949

3rd President of BCCI
- In office 1935–1937
- Preceded by: Sir Sikandar Hayat Khan
- Succeeded by: Sir K. S. Digvijaysinhji

Nawab Hamidullah Khan GCSI GCIE CVO KStJ (9 September 1894 – 4 February 1960) was the last ruling Nawab of the princely salute state of Bhopal. He ruled from 1926 when his mother, Begum Kaikhusrau Jahan Begum, abdicated in his favour, until 1949 and held the honorific title until his death in 1960. A delegate to the Round Table Conference in London, he served as Chancellor of the Chamber of Princes from 1944 to 1947, when India became independent as the Dominion of India.

During the Second World War, Nawab Hamidullah was present at the Battle of Keren and the Battle of El Alamein. He was very close to Muhammad Ali Jinnah and on very good terms with Louis Mountbatten, Viceroy and Governor General of India. Despite pressure from Jinnah, he reluctantly agreed to have Bhopal join the Union of India. He was succeeded by his second daughter, Sajida Sultan, Begum of Bhopal.

== Personal life ==
Nawab Hamidullah Khan attended the Muhammadan Anglo-Oriental College (MAO College), now the Aligarh Muslim University, graduating in 1905 and Allahabad University, graduating with a BA in law in 1915.

On 5 September 1925 at Peshawar, Nawab Hamidullah Khan married Maimoona Sultan Shah Banu Begum Sahiba (1900–1982), the great-great-granddaughter of Padshah Shuja Shah Durrani of Afghanistan. The couple had three daughters:

- Suraya Jah, Nawab Gowhar-i-Taj, Abida Sultan Begum Sahiba
- HH Sikander Saulat, Iftikhar ul-Mulk, Nawab Mehr-i-Taj Sajida Sultan Begum Sahiba, Nawab Begum of Dar ul-Iqbal-i-Bhopal
- Nawabzadi Qamar-i-Taj Dulhan Rabia Sultan Begum Sahiba (1916–2001). Married twice and had one son and one daughter.

In 1947, he married Aftab Jahan Begum Sahiba (1919–2002), the daughter of a local Bhopali Muslim family. The couple had one daughter:

- Farzana Begum Sahiba (1948)

He remained the Chancellor of Aligarh Muslim University from September 1930 to April 1935.

== Titles ==
- 1894–1903: Nawabzada Muhammad Hamidu'llah Khan Bahadur
- 1903–1907: Hajji Nawabzada Muhammad Hamidu'llah Khan Bahadur
- 1907–1921: Hajji Nawabzada Hafiz Muhammad Hamidu'llah Khan Bahadur
- 1921–1922: Hajji Nawabzada Hafiz Muhammad Hamidu'llah Khan Bahadur, CSI
- 1922–1923: Hajji Nawabzada Hafiz Muhammad Hamidu'llah Khan Bahadur, CSI, CVO
- 1923–1926: Lieutenant Hajji Nawabzada Hafiz Muhammad Hamidu'llah Khan Bahadur, CSI, CVO
- 1926–1927: Lieutenant His Highness Sikander Saulat, Iftikhar ul-Mulk, Hajji Nawab Hafiz Muhammad Hamidu'llah Khan Bahadur, Nawab of Dar ul-Iqbal-i-Bhopal, CSI, CVO
- 1927–1929: Lieutenant-Colonel His Highness Sikander Saulat, Iftikhar ul-Mulk, Hajji Nawab Hafiz Sir Muhammad Hamidu'llah Khan Bahadur, Nawab of Dar ul-Iqbal-i-Bhopal, GCIE, CSI, CVO, KStJ
- 1929–1932: Lieutenant-Colonel His Highness Sikander Saulat, Iftikhar ul-Mulk, Hajji Nawab Hafiz Sir Muhammad Hamidu'llah Khan Bahadur, Nawab of Dar ul-Iqbal-i-Bhopal, GCIE, CSI, CVO, KStJ
- 1932–1939: Lieutenant-Colonel His Highness Sikander Saulat, Iftikhar ul-Mulk, Hajji Nawab Hafiz Sir Muhammad Hamidu'llah Khan Bahadur, Nawab of Dar ul-Iqbal-i-Bhopal, GCSI, GCIE, CVO, KStJ
- 1939–1943: Colonel His Highness Sikander Saulat, Iftikhar ul-Mulk, Hajji Nawab Hafiz Sir Muhammad Hamidu'llah Khan Bahadur, Nawab of Dar ul-Iqbal-i-Bhopal, GCSI, GCIE, CVO, KStJ
- 1943–1945: Air Commodore His Highness Sikander Saulat, Iftikhar ul-Mulk, Hajji Nawab Hafiz Sir Muhammad Hamidu'llah Khan Bahadur, Nawab of Dar ul-Iqbal-i-Bhopal, GCSI, GCIE, CVO, KStJ
- 1945–1946: Air Vice-Marshal His Highness Sikander Saulat, Iftikhar ul-Mulk, Hajji Nawab Hafiz Sir Muhammad Hamidu'llah Khan Bahadur, Nawab of Dar ul-Iqbal-i-Bhopal, GCSI, GCIE, CVO, KStJ
- 1946–1960: Major-General & Air Vice-Marshal His Highness Sikander Saulat, Iftikhar ul-Mulk, Hajji Nawab Hafiz Sir Muhammad Hamidu'llah Khan Bahadur, Nawab of Dar ul-Iqbal-i-Bhopal, GCSI, GCIE, CVO, KStJ

== Honours ==

- Delhi Durbar Gold Medal, 1903
- Delhi Durbar Gold Medal, 1911
- Prince of Wales Visit Medal, 1922
- Commander of the Royal Victorian Order (CVO), 1922
- Knight Grand Commander of the Order of the Indian Empire (GCIE), 1929
- Knight Grand Commander of the Order of the Star of India (GCSI), 1932 (CSI - 1921)
- Knight of the Order of St John (KStJ)
- King George V Silver Jubilee Medal, 1935
- King George VI Coronation Medal, 1937
- 1939-1945 Star, 1945
- Africa Star, 1945
- Burma Star, 1945
- Defence Medal, 1945
- India Service Medal, 1945
- Indian Independence Medal, 1947
- Queen Elizabeth II Coronation Medal, 1953

== Gallery ==
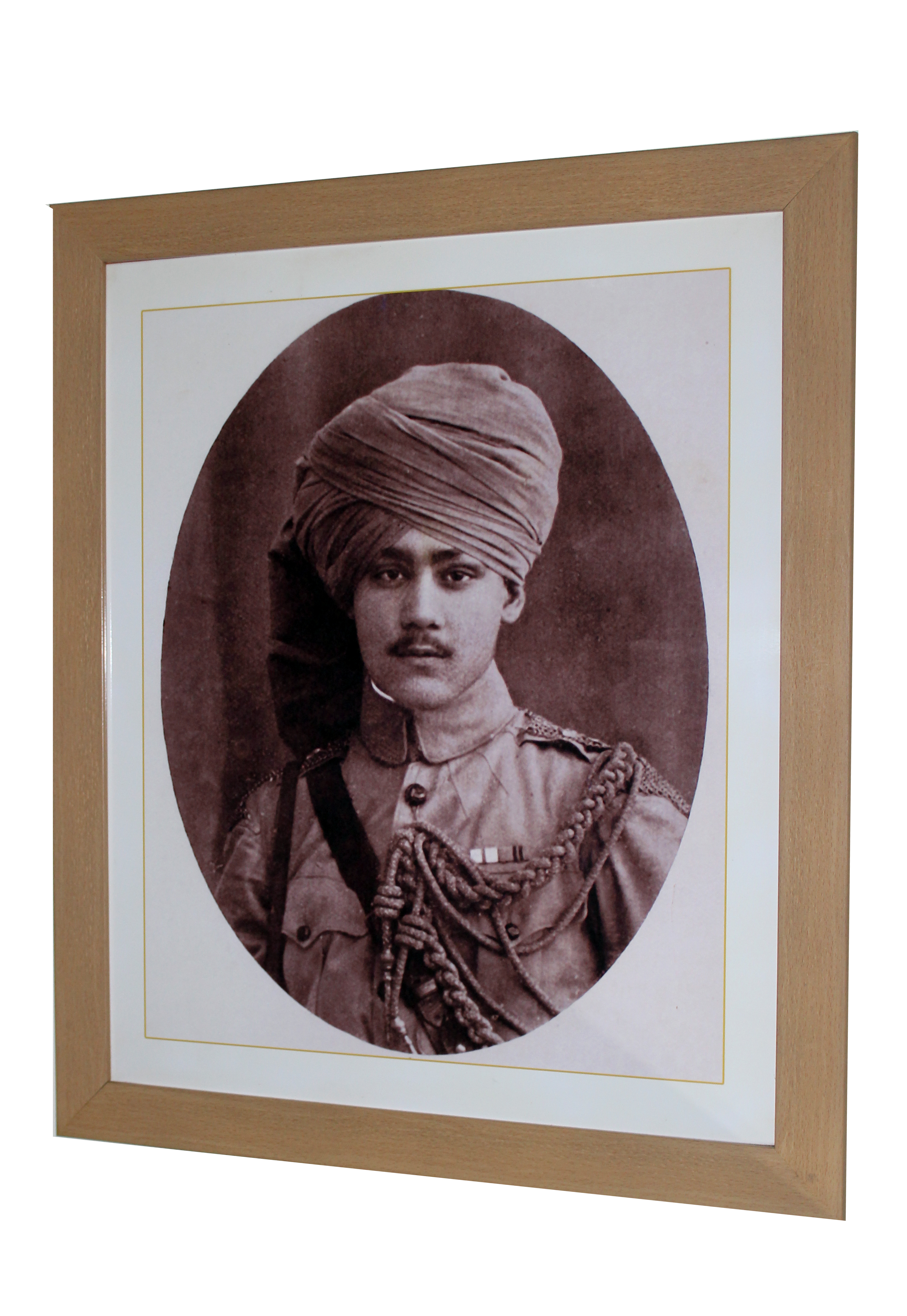
Image inside Golghar Bhopal

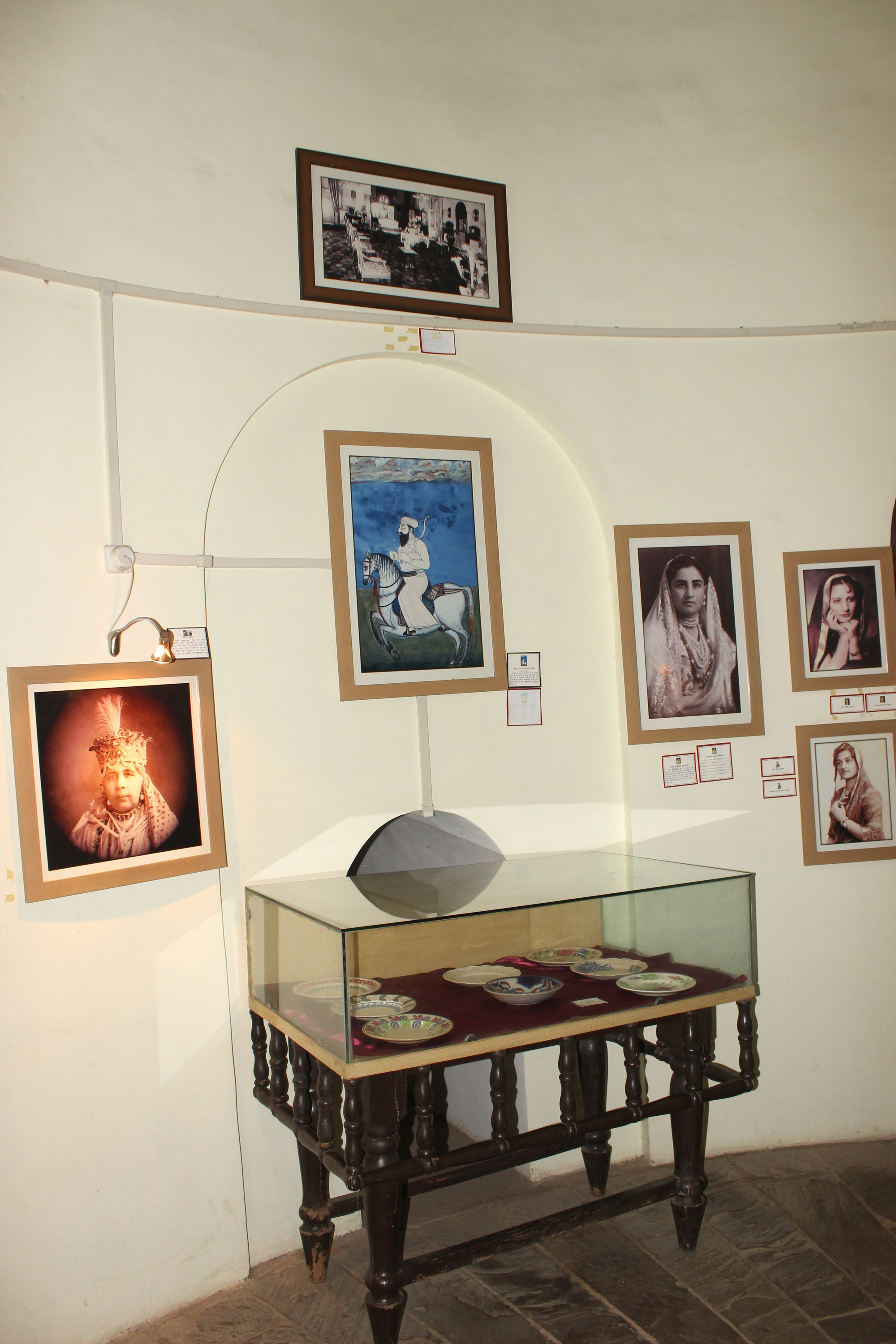
Inside Golghar Bhopal

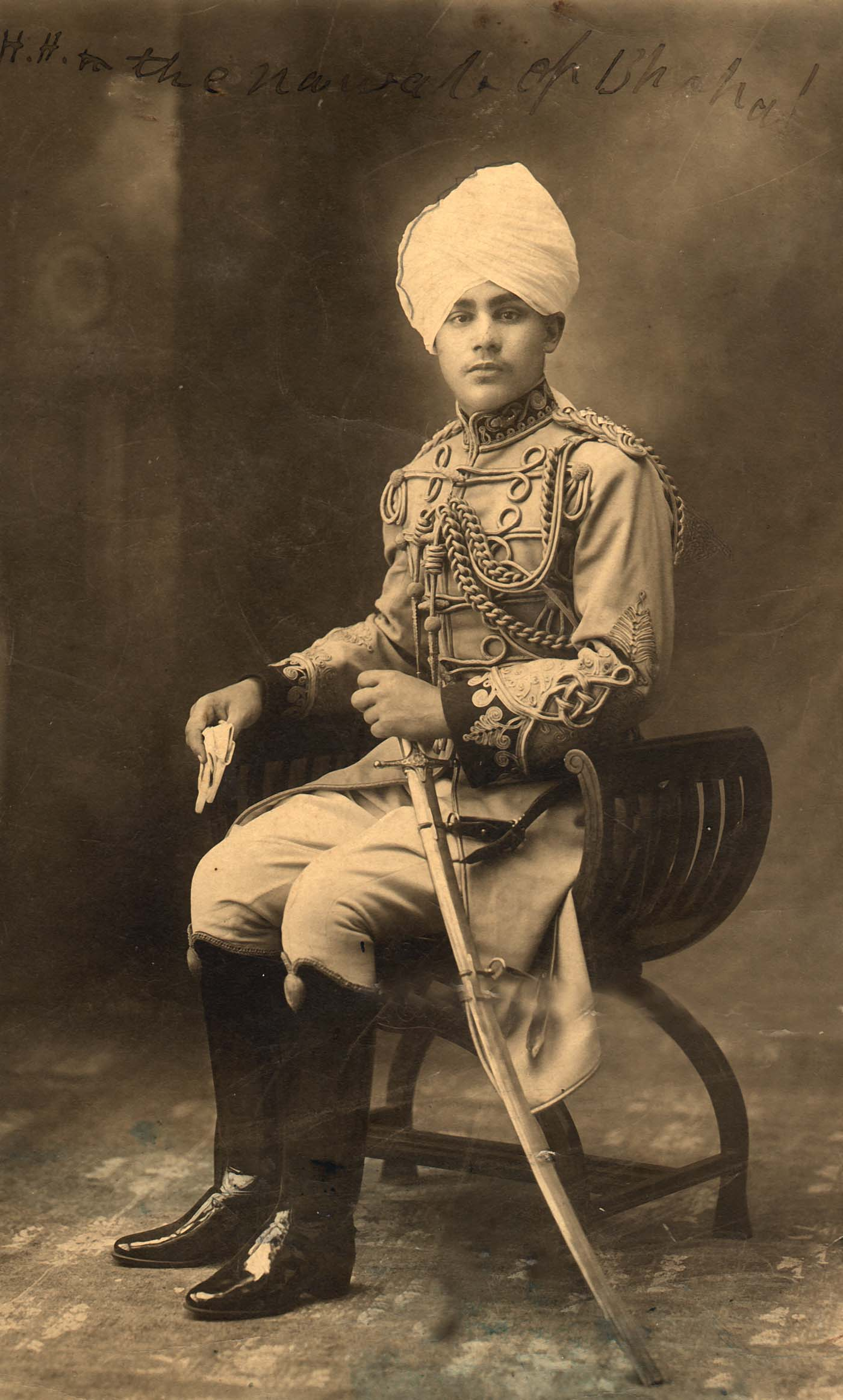
A young Nawab Hamidullah Khan

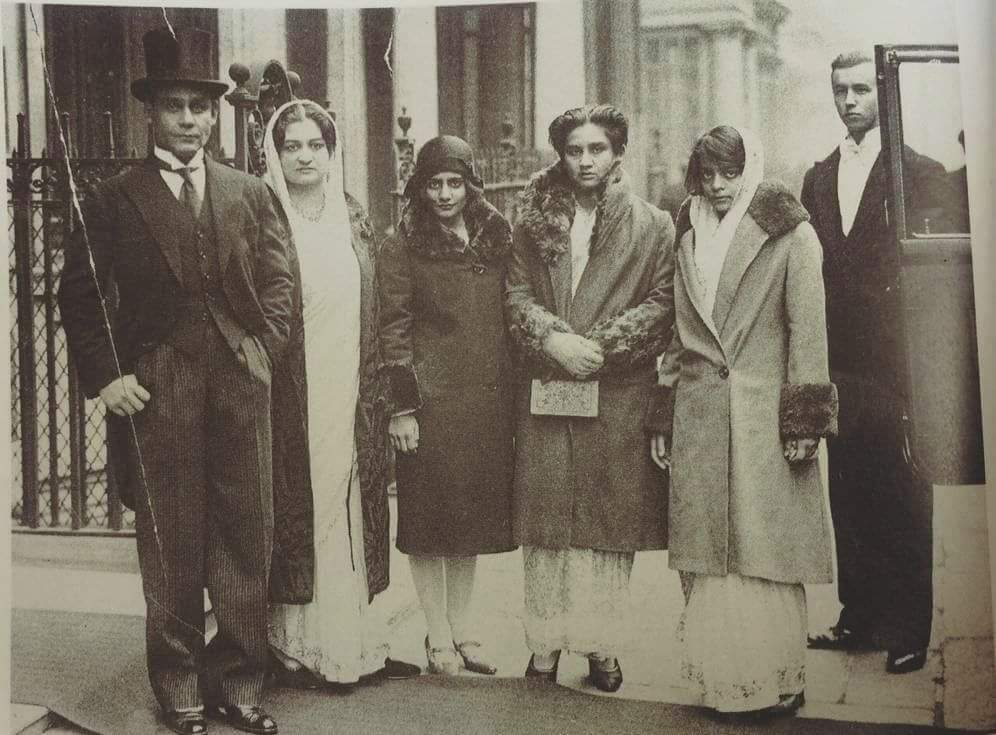
Bhopal royal family. From left to right: Nawab Hamidullah Khan, his wife Maimoona Sultan, their daughters, Rabia Sultan, Abida Sultan, Sajida Sultan in London

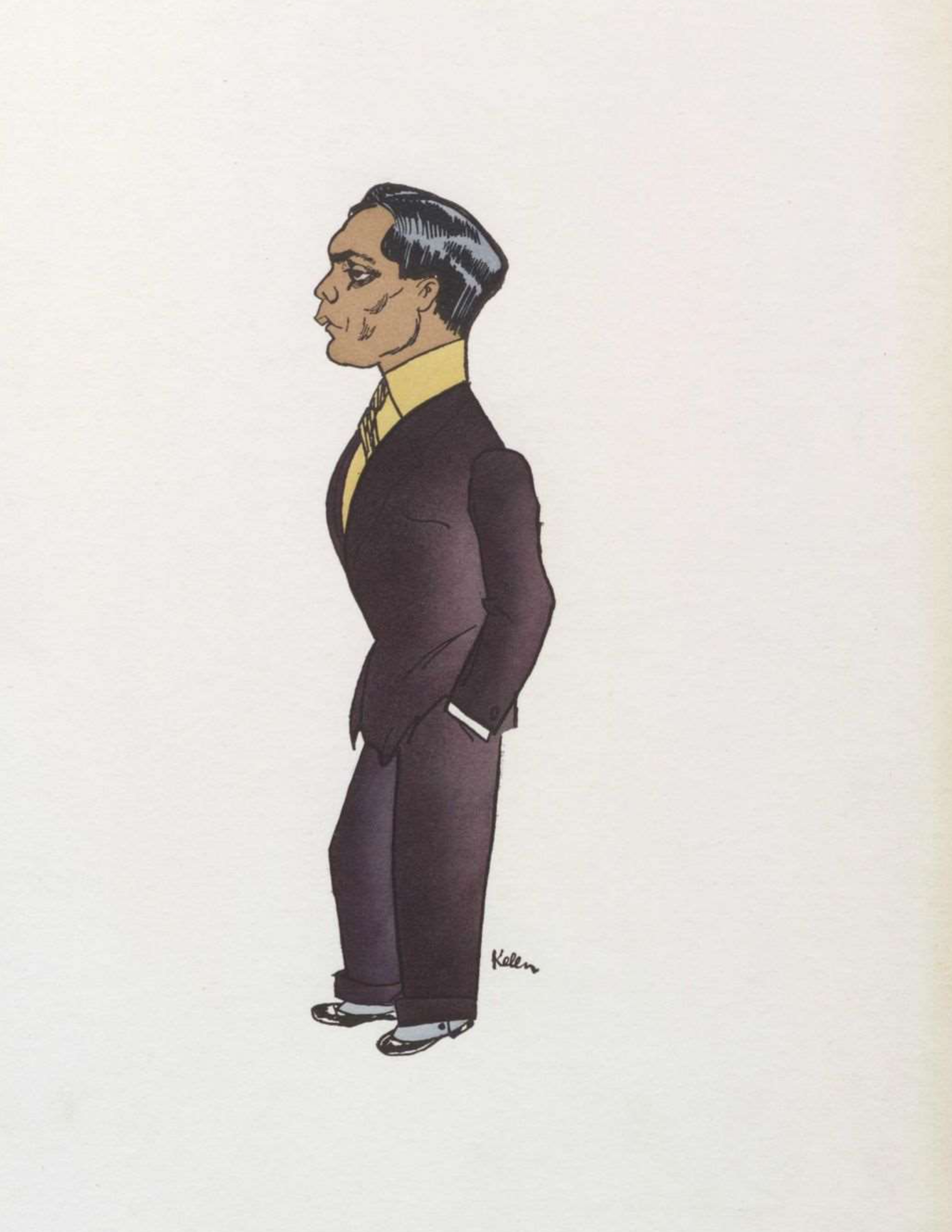
Caricature by Emery Kelen
