= Nawabs of Bhopal =

Indian Muslim rulers (1707–1949)

Nawab of Bhopal
- Coat of arms of Bhopal
- Creation date: 1707
- First holder: Dost Mohammad Khan (1707–1728)
- Last holder: Hamidullah Khan (1926–1949)
- Status: Title abolished
- Extinction date: 1 June 1949
Mirazi Khel dynasty
- Parent family: Orakzai dynasty
- Country: Bhopal State
- Origin: Tirah
- Founder: Dost Mohammad Khan
- Current head: Disputed since 1960: Saif Ali Khan (Paternal Grandson of Sajida Sultan) (Great Grandson of Hamidullah Khan); Shahryar Khan (Son of Abida Sultan) (Maternal Grandson of Hamidullah Khan)
- Connected families: List: Pataudi family; Paigah family; Tagore family; Barua family; Kapoor family; Singh-Virk family
- Traditions: Sunni Islam
- Motto: Nasr min Allah (God Giveth Victory)

The Nawabs of Bhopal were the Muslim rulers of Bhopal, now part of Madhya Pradesh, India. The nawabs first ruled under the Mughal Empire from 1707 to 1737, under the Maratha Confederacy from 1737 to 1818, then under British rule from 1818 to 1947, and independently thereafter until it was acceded to the Union of India in 1949. The female nawabs of Bhopal held the title Nawab Begum of Bhopal.

== List of rulers of Bhopal ==
=== Nawabs of Bhopal ===
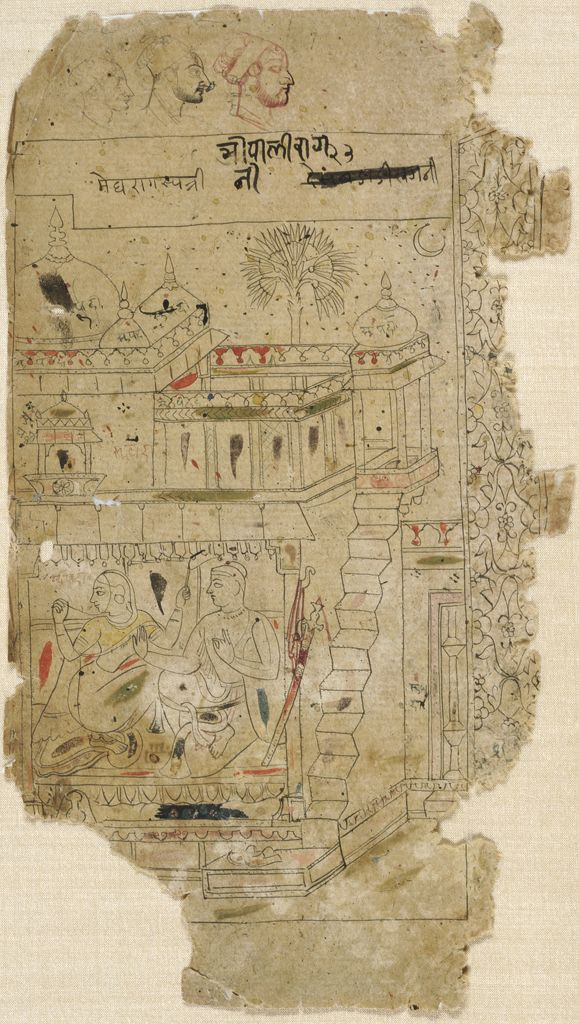
Nawabs of Bhopal, c. 1630–1640

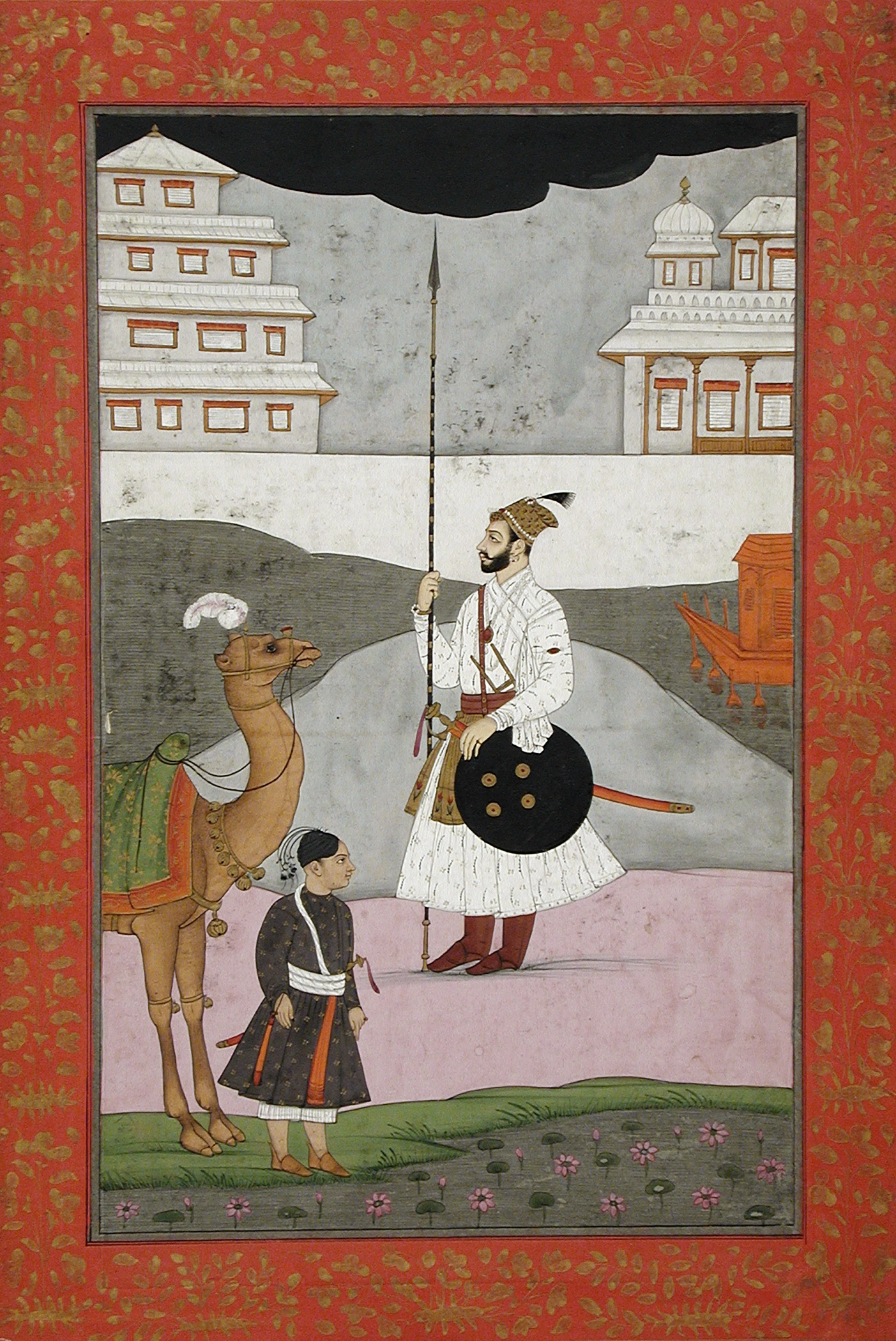
Nawab of Bhopal, 17–18th century

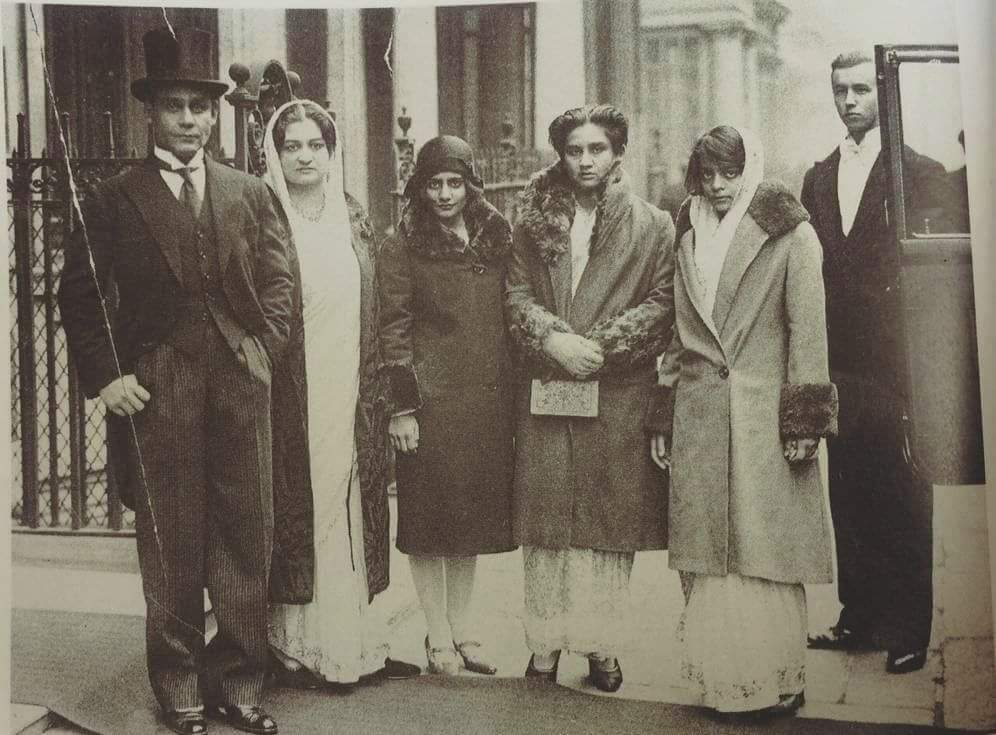
Bhopal royal family: From left to right – Nawab Hamidullah Khan, his wife Maimoona Sultan, their daughters – Rabia Sultan, Abida Sultan, Sajida Sultan in London, 1932

1. Nawab Dost Muhammad Khan (circa 1672–1728); founded the state of Bhopal in 1707 and ruled it until 1728. He also founded the city of Islamnagar, founded by Dost Mohammad Khan in 1716 and early 1720s.
2. Nawab Sultan Muhammad (1720–?); ruled from 1728 to 1742.
  - Nawab Yar Muhammad Khan (1709–1742), Regent of Bhopal; 1728–1742.
3. Nawab Faiz Mohammad Khan (1731–1777); ruled from 1742 to 1777.
4. Nawab Hayat Muhammad Khan (1736–1807); ruled from 1777 to 1807.
5. Nawab Ghaus Muhammad Khan (1767–1826); ruled from 1807 to 1826.
6. Nawab Muiz Muhammad Khan (circa 1795–1869); ruled from 1826 to 1837. He was succeeded by his wife Qudsia Begum.
7. Nawab Jahangir Muhammad Khan (1816–1844); ruled from 1837 to 1844. He was succeeded by his daughter Shah Jahan Begum.

=== Nawab Begums of Bhopal ===
1. Qudsia Begum (ruler from 1819 to 1837) – In 1819, 18-year-old Qudsia Begum (also known as Gohar Begum) took over the reins after the assassination of her husband. She was the first female ruler of Bhopal. She declared that her 2-year old daughter Sikander will follow her as the ruler. None of the male family members dared to challenge her decision. She ruled till 1837 when she abdicated having adequately prepared her daughter for ruling the state. She was succeeded by her son-in-law Jahangir Muhammad Khan who married her daughter Sikandar Begum.
2. Nawab Sikandar Begum (ruled from 1860 to 1868) - She was the daughter of Nawab Muiz Muhammed Khan and Nawab Qudsia Begum. In 1837, her mother abdicated in favour of her son-in-law and Sikandar's husband, but after his death in 1844, Sikandar's daughter Sultan Shah Jahan was recognised as ruler. Sikandar Begum governed as regent until 1860 when the British recognised her as the ruler of Bhopal and Shah Jahan was set aside. She ruled as Nawab for eight years until her death in 1868.
3. Begum Sultan Shah Jehan (ruled from 1844 to 1860 and 1868 to 1901) – Shahjahan was the only surviving child of Sikandar Begum, sometime Nawab of Bhopal by correct title, and her husband Jahangir Mohammed Khan. She was recognised as ruler of Bhopal in 1844 at the age of six; her mother wielded power as regent during her minority. However, in 1860, her mother Sikandar Begum was recognised by the British as ruler of Bhopal in her own right, and Shahjahan was set aside. However, in 1868, Sikandar Begum died and Shah Jahan succeeded her. During her reign the first postage stamps of the Bhopal state were issued. In 1876 and 1878 there were issues of half and quarter anna stamps. Those of 1876 have text "HH Nawab Shahjahan Begam" in an octagonal frame; the 1878 stamps the same text in a round frame and the Urdu form of the Begum's title. The last stamps bearing her name were issued in 1902 with inscription: "H.H. Nawab Sultan Jahan Begam".
4. Begum Kaikhusrau Jahan (ruled from 1901 to 1926, died 1930) - The only daughter of Baki Muhammed Khan Bahadur and Sultan Shah Jahan Begum, she succeeded her mother in 1901 until her own death in 1926. Her son succeeded her.

=== Titular rulers ===
1. Al-Haj Nawab Sir Hafiz Muhammad, Khan Bahadur, GCSI, GCIE, CVO (1894–1960); ruled from 1926 to 1947, serving as nominal ruler to his death in 1960. Last of the sovereign Nawabs of Bhopal.
2. Sajida Sultan, Begum of Bhopal (1915–1995); ruled from (1960–1971), titular Begum of Bhopal until 1971 when India abolished royal entitlements through the 26th Amendment to the Constitution of India.

==== Family tree ====
The family tree of the ruling dynasty is given below:

- Sardar Khair Muhammad Khan Orakzai of the Mirazi Khel branch of the Orakzais of Tirah
  - Mir Quli Khan siddiqui
    - Mir Hazar Khan siddiqui
      - Sardar Muhammad Jalal Khan Lohari (d. 1717)
        - Sardar Muhammad Yar Khan
          - Sardar Dilawar 'Ali Khan
            - Sardar Iman 'Ali Khan
              - Sardar Hasan 'Ali Khan
                - Sardar Mansur Khan
                  - Baqi Muhammad Khan (d. 1860s)
                    - Nawab Ahmad 'Ali Khan Bahadur, Nawab Consort of Bhopal (1854–1902) m. 1874. X. Nawab Sultan Kaikhusrau Jahan Begum Sahiba, Nawab Begum of Dar ul-Iqbal-i-Bhopal GCSI, GCIE, CI, GBE (1858–1930; r. 1901–1926, when she abdicated in favour of her son)
                      - XI. Hajji Hafiz Muhammad Hamidu'llah Khan Bahadur, Nawab of Dar ul-Iqbal-i-Bhopal GCSI, GCIE, CVO (1894–1960; r. 1926–1949; titular Nawab and family head: 1949–1960)
                        - XII. Mehr-i-Taj Sajida Sultan Begum Sahiba, Nawab Begum of Dar ul-Iqbal-i-Bhopal (1915–1995; titular Nawab Begum and family head: 1960–1995 (legal status and recognition as Nawab Begum revoked December 1971). m. Nawab Muhammad Iftikhar 'Ali Khan Bahadur, Nawab of Pataudi (1910–1952)
                          - XIII. Saleha Sultan, titular Nawab Begum of Bhopal (1940–2020), Head of Royal House of Bhopal, m. Bashir Yar Jung and Muhammad Mansur 'Ali Khan Bahadur, Nawab of Pataudi (1941–2011; titular Nawab of Pataudi: 1952–2011 (derecognised 1971);
                            - XIV. Muhammad Saif Ali Khan, Nawab of Pataudi (b. 1970; titular Nawab of Pataudi: 2011–present
                              - Sahibzada Muhammad Ibrahim 'Ali Khan (b. 2001.)
  - Sardar Khan Muhammad Khan
    - Sardar Jan Muhammad Khan
      - Sardar Nur Muhammad Khan (d. 1714)
        - Sardar Aqil Muhammad Khan (d. 1742) Wazir to Nawab Dost Muhammad Khan. Joint Nawab Regent of Bhopal: 1728–1742
        - I. Dost Muhammad Khan Bahadur, Nawab of Dar ul-Iqbal-i-Bhopal (1672–1728; Nawab of Bhopal: 1723; r. 1723–1728)
          - Nawab Yar Muhammad Khan Bahadur, Nawab Regent of Bhopal (1709–1742). Joint Nawab Regent of Bhopal: 1728–1742
            - III. Faiz Muhammad Khan Bahadur, Nawab of Dar ul-Iqbal-i-Bhopal (1731–1777; r. 1742–1777)
            - IV. Hayat Muhammad Khan Bahadur, Nawab of Dar ul-Iqbal-i-Bhopal (1736–1807; r. 1777–1807)
              - V. Ghaus Muhammad Khan Bahadur, Nawab of Dar ul-Iqbal-i-Bhopal (1767–1826; r. 1807–1826)
                - VI. Muiz Muhammad Khan Bahadur, Nawab of Dar ul-Iqbal-i-Bhopal (c. 1795?–1869; r. 1826–1837)
                - Nawab Begum Qudsia Begum Sahiba, Nawab Begum Regent of Bhopal CI (1801–1881; Nawab Begum Regent of Bhopal: 1819–1837). m. Nawab Nasir Muhammad Khan Bahadur, Nawab Regent of Bhopal (1793–1819; Regent of Bhopal: 1816–1819) and had issue – see below.
          - II. Sultan Muhammad Khan Bahadur, Nawab of Dar ul-Iqbal-i-Bhopal (1720-after 1742; r. 1728–1742)
          - Nawabzada Fazil Muhammad Khan
            - Mian Sharif Muhammad Khan (d. 1787)
              - Nawab Wazir Muhammad Khan Bahadur, Nawab Regent of Dar ul-Iqbal-i-Bhopal (1766–1816; Regent of Bhopal: 1808–1816)
                - Mian Amir Muhammad Khan (d. 1854)
                  - VII. Jahangir Muhammad Khan Bahadur, Nawab of Dar ul-Iqbal-i-Bhopal (1816–1844; r. 1837–1844). m. VIII. Sikander Begum Sahiba, Nawab Begum of Dar ul-Iqbal-i-Bhopal (1817–1868; Nawab Begum Regent of Bhopal: 1847–1860; Nawab Begum of Bhopal: 1860–1868)
                    - IX. Nawab Sultan Shah Jahan Begum Sahiba, Nawab Begum of Dar ul-Iqbal-i-Bhopal GCSI, CI (1838–1901; r. 1844–1860, 1868–1901)
                      - X. Nawab Sultan Kaikhusrau Jahan Begum Sahiba, Nawab Begum of Dar ul-Iqbal-i-Bhopal GCSI, GCIE, CI, GBE (1858–1930; r. 1901–1926, when she abdicated in favour of her son) m. Nawab Ahmad 'Ali Khan Bahadur, Nawab Consort of Bhopal (1854–1902) – see above
                - Nawab Nasir Muhammad Khan Bahadur, Nawab Regent of Bhopal (1793–1819; Regent of Bhopal: 1816–1819). m. Nawab Begum Qudsia Begum Sahiba, Nawab Begum Regent of Bhopal (1801–1881; Nawab Begum Regent of Bhopal: 1819–1837). and had issue:
                  - VIII. Sikander Begum Sahiba, Nawab Begum of Dar ul-Iqbal-i-Bhopal GCSI (1817–1868; Nawab Begum Regent of Bhopal: 1847–1860; Nawab Begum of Bhopal: 1860–1868)

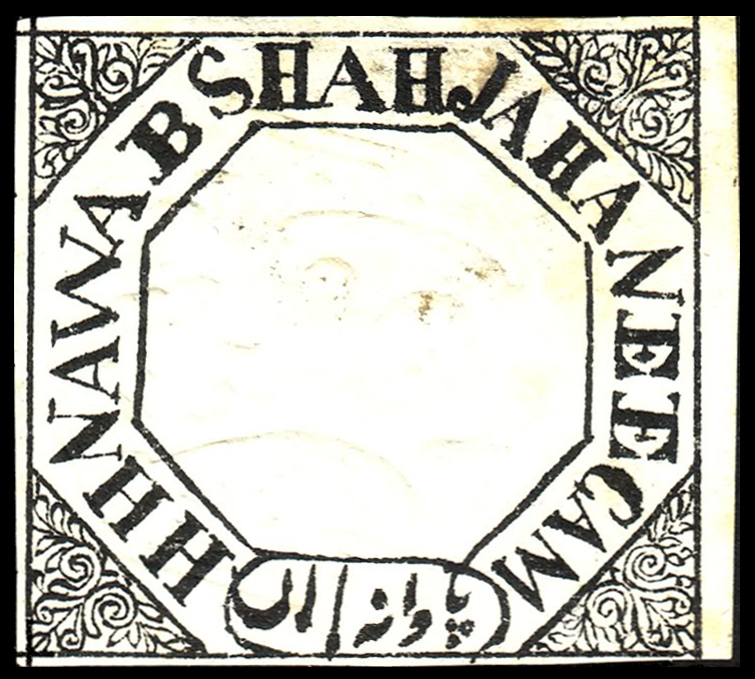
1876 stamp issued during the reign of Nawab Begum Shahjahan

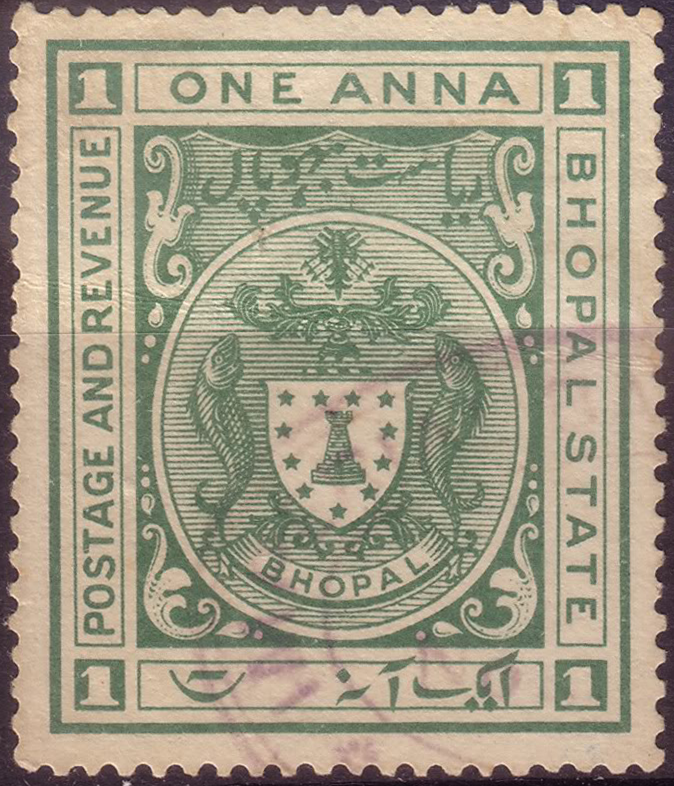
1908 one anna stamp of Bhopal State

== See also ==
- List of Sunni Muslim dynasties
- Pathans of Madhya Pradesh
