= Chaman (disambiguation) =

Chaman is a city in Pakistan.

Chaman (Persian: چمن) may also refer to:

== Villages in Iran ==
- Chaman-e Bahram
- Chaman-e Buraki
- Chaman-e Morvarid
- Chaman Zar (disambiguation)
- Chaman, Gilan
- Chaman, Golestan
- Chaman, Ilam
- Chaman, Kerman
- Chaman, Kermanshah
- Chaman, Khuzestan
- Chaman, Haftgel
- Chaman, Mazandaran
- Chaman, West Azerbaijan
- Chaman, Sumay-ye Beradust

== Other places ==
- Chaman border crossing on the Pakistan-Afghanistan border
- Chaman District in Pakistan
- Chaman Fault, a geological fault in Pakistan and Afghanistan
- Chaman Mahal, a palace in the Bhopal district of Madhya Pradesh, India
- Chaman Rural District in West Azerbaijan Province, Iran

== Other uses ==
- Chaman (name)
- Ujda Chaman, a 2019 Indian Hindi-language film
- Chaman Bahaar, a 2020 Indian Hindi-language film

== See also ==
- Chaman bombing (disambiguation)
