= Shegaftik =

Shegaftik (Persian: شگفتيك), also rendered as Shekaftik, may refer to:

- Shegaftik-e Olya
- Shegaftik-e Sofla
