= Cheshmeh Nezar =

Cheshmeh Nezar or Cheshmeh-ye Nazar (Persian: چشمه نظار) may refer to:

- Cheshmeh Nezar-e Olya
- Cheshmeh Nezar-e Sofla
