= Bhopal district =

Coordinates: 23.2667°N 77.4°E

- District of Madhya Pradesh
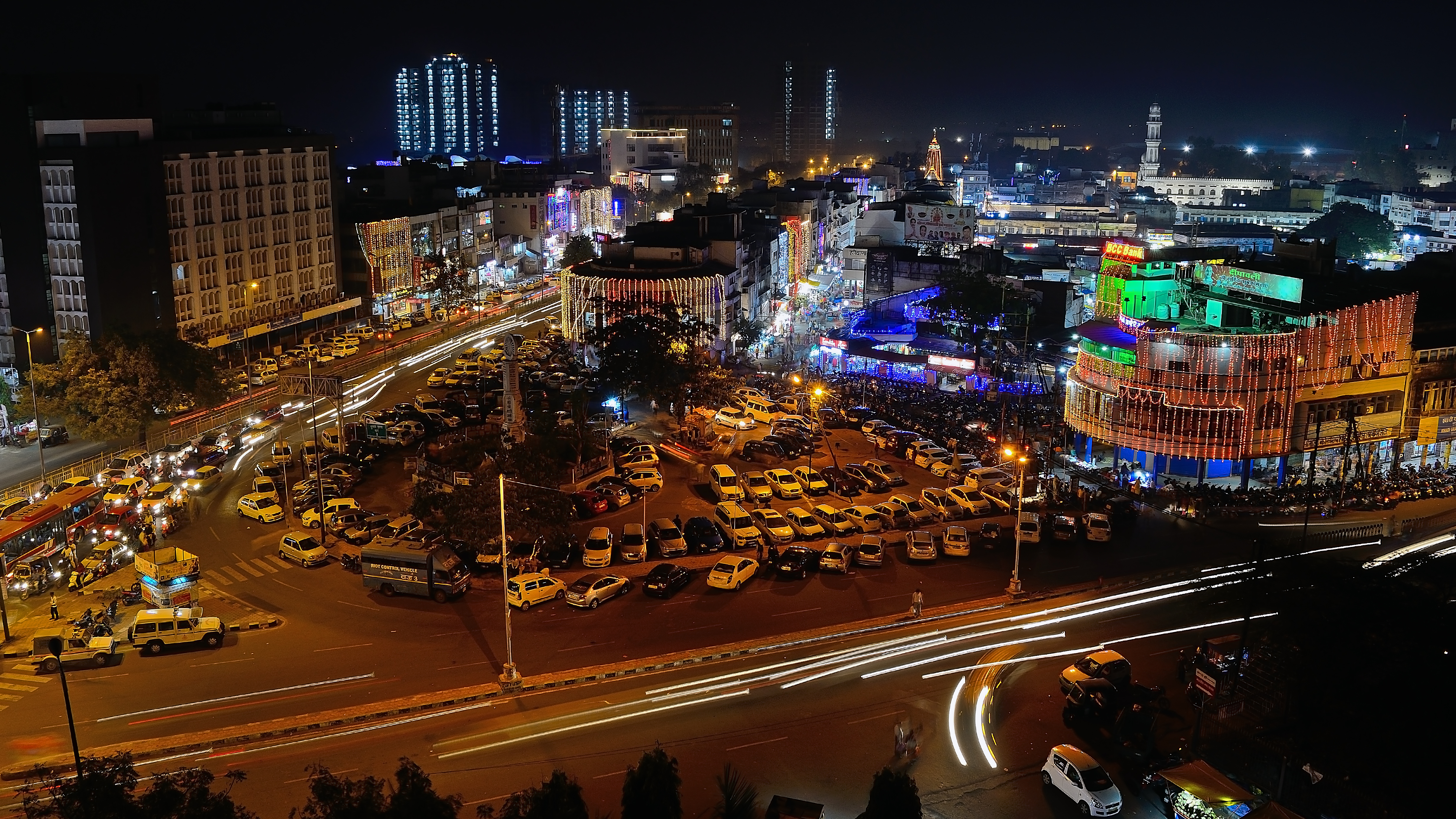
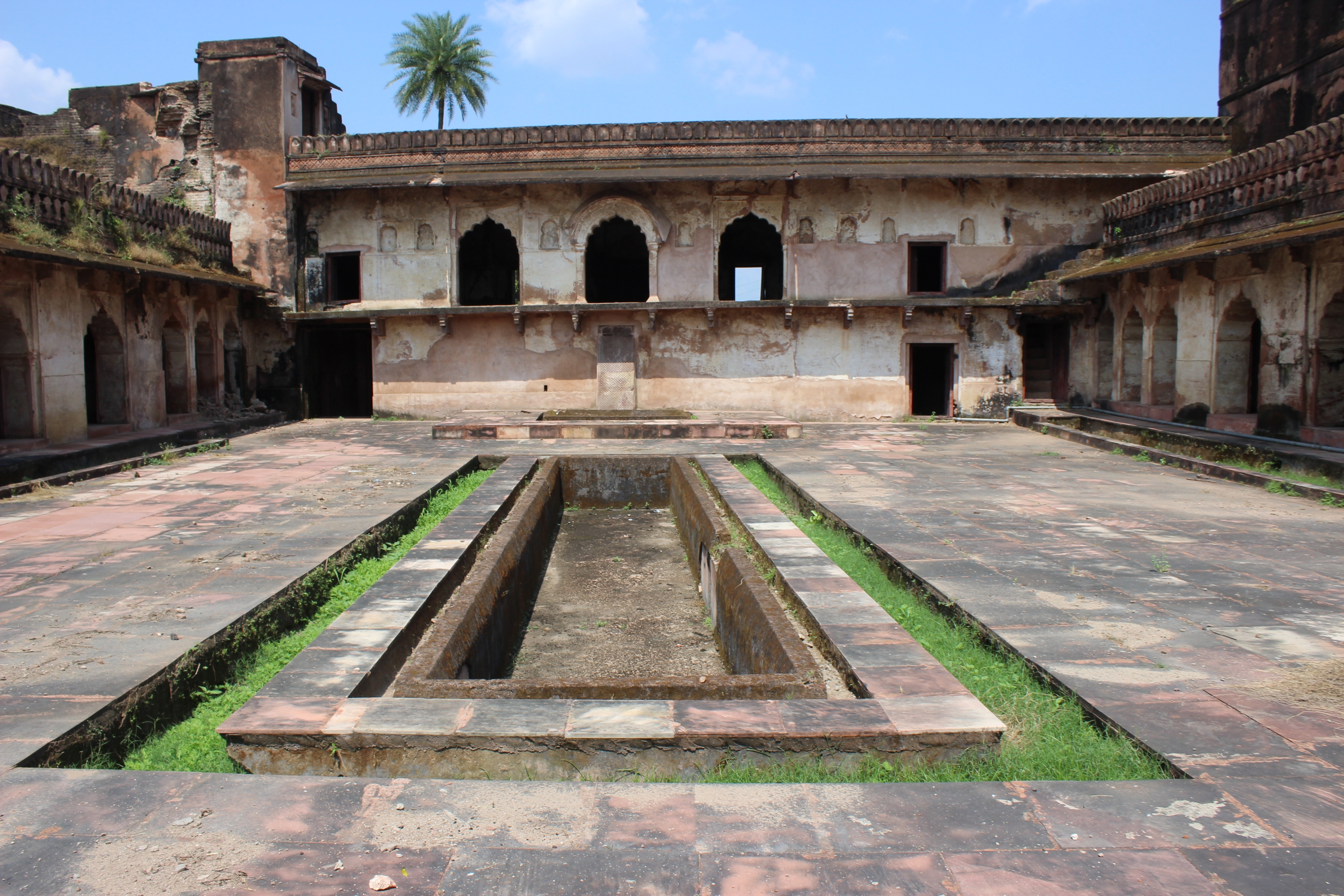
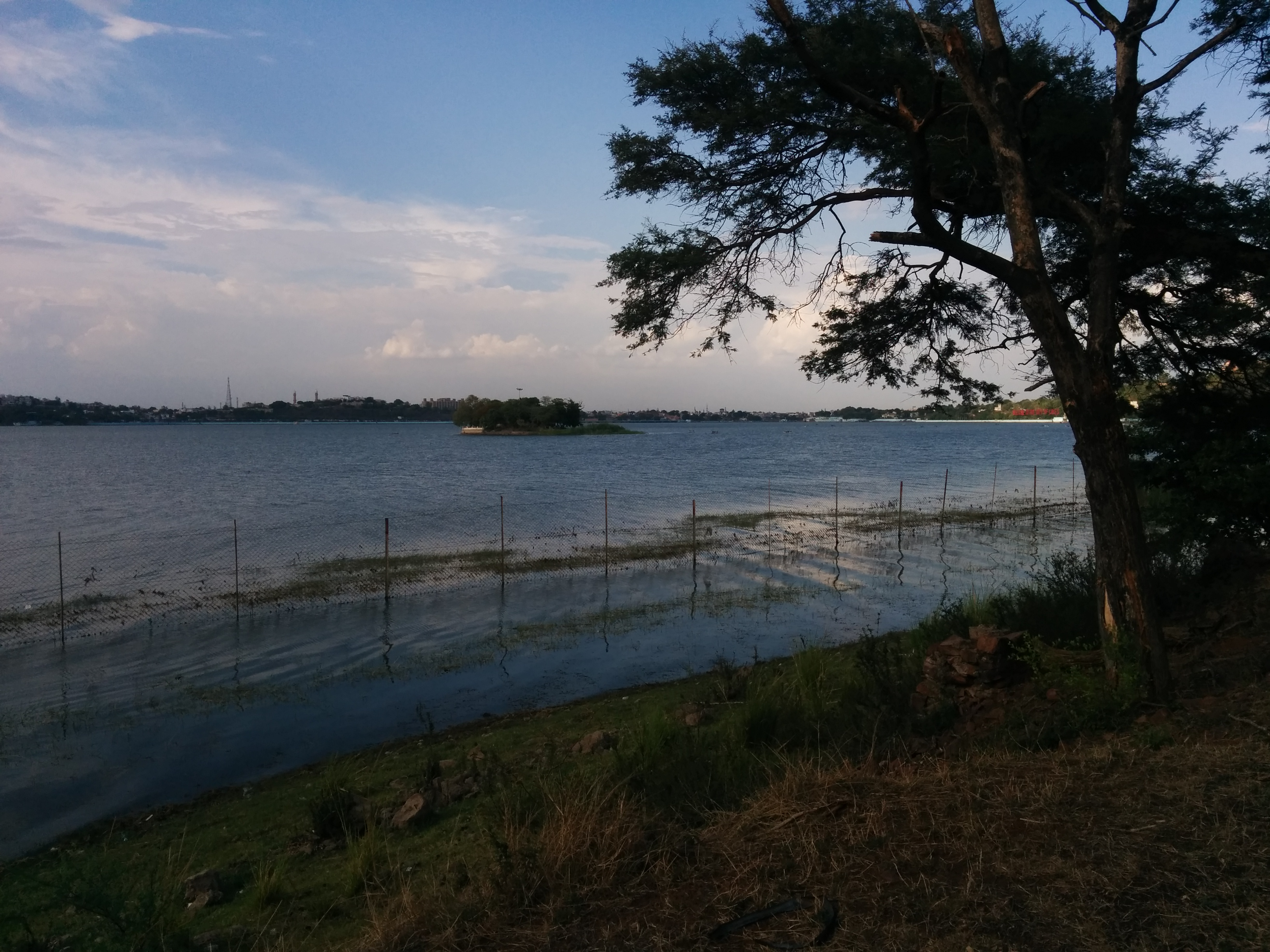
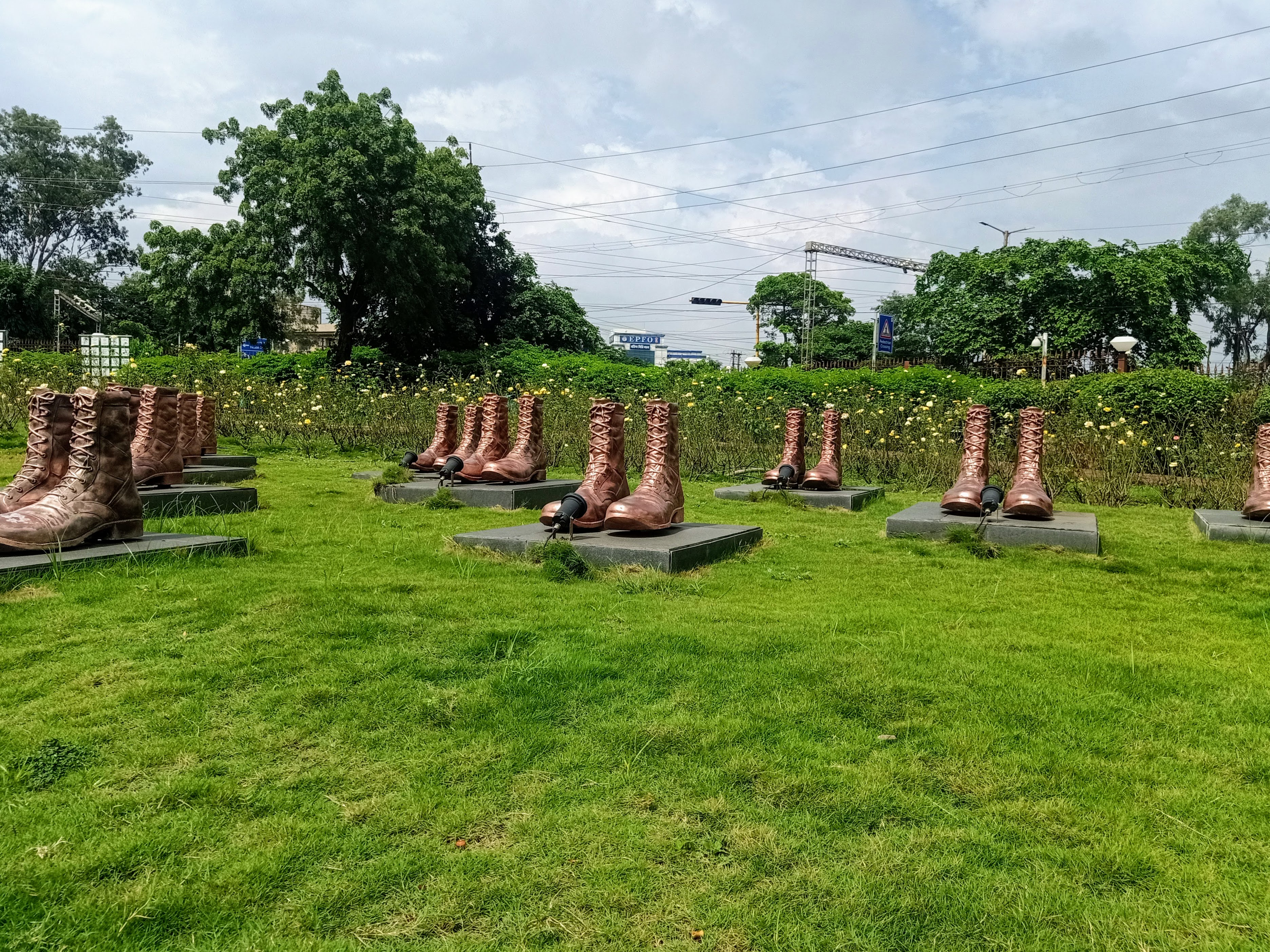
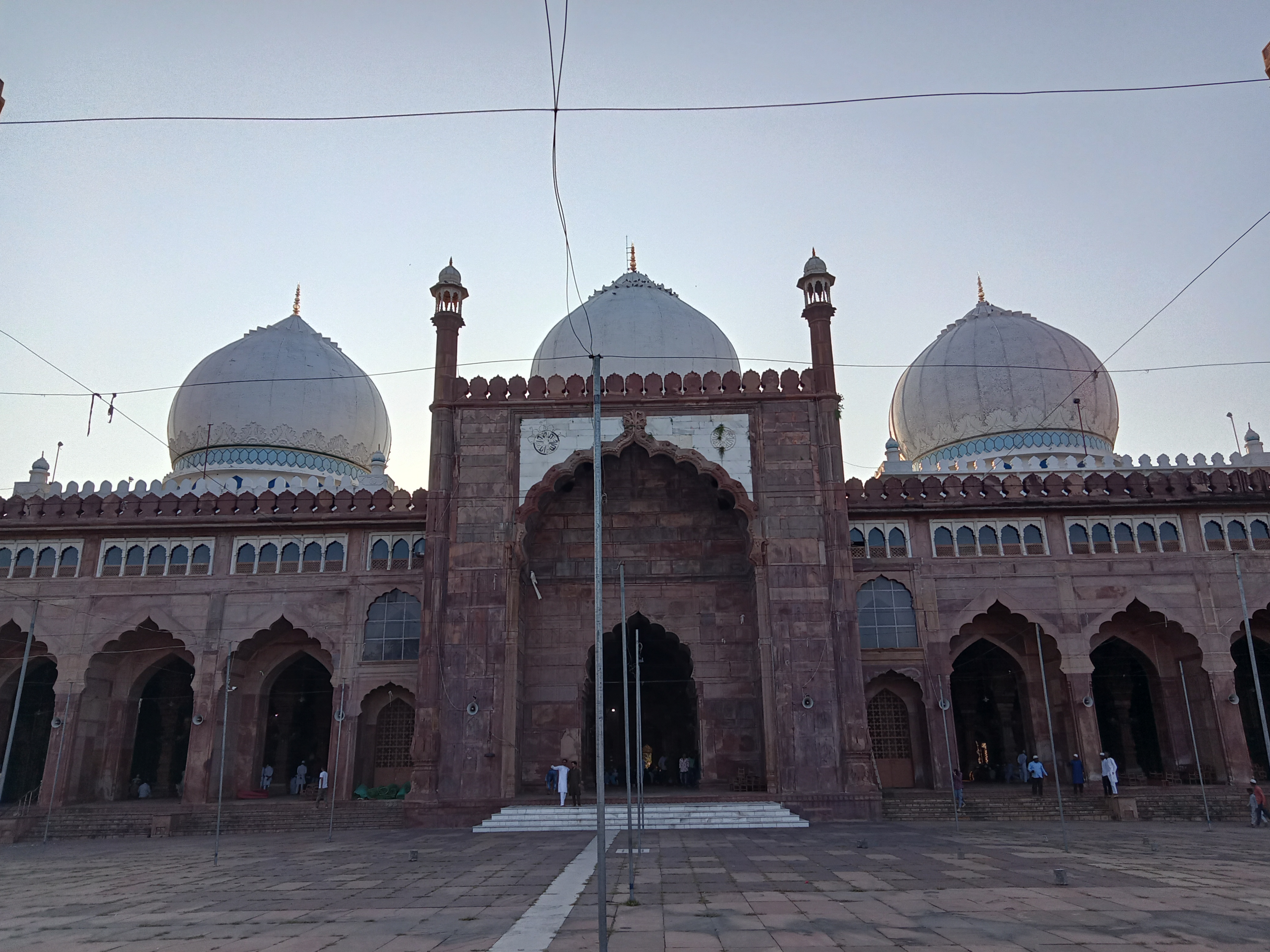
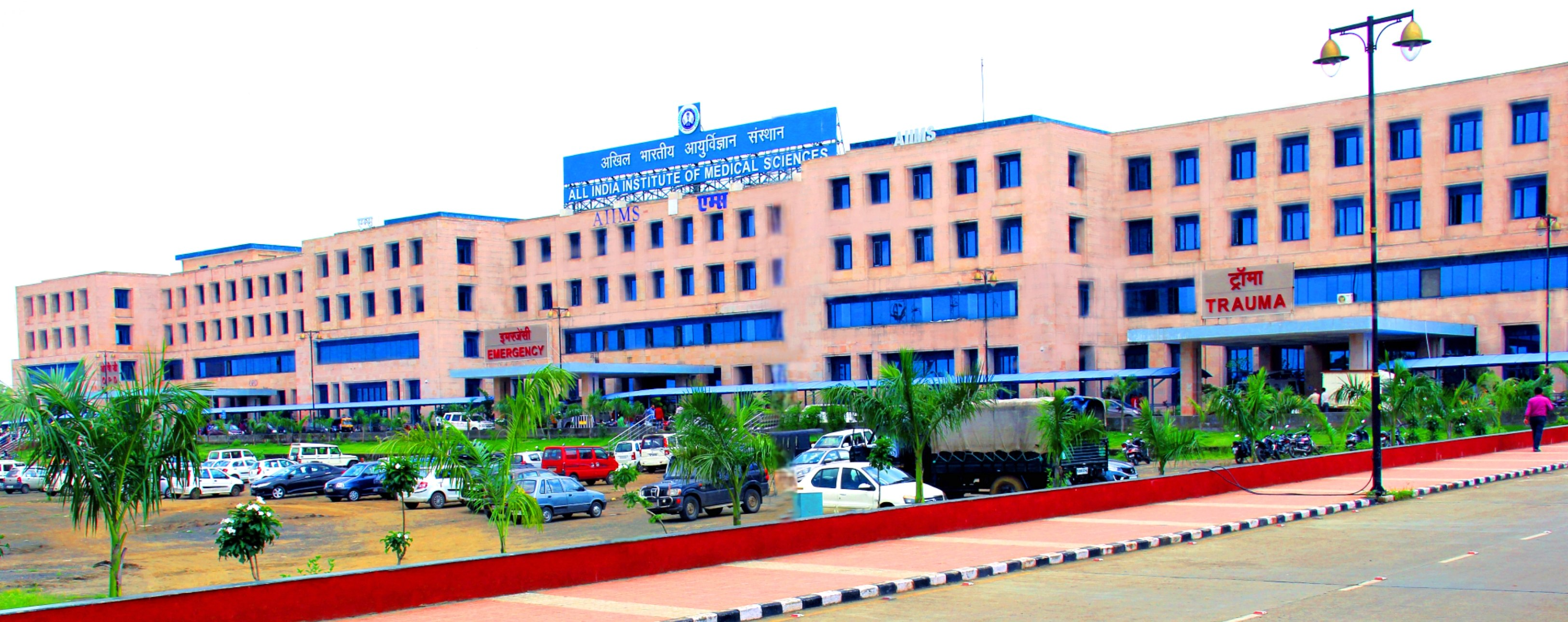
- Clockwise from top-left: New Market on the eve of Diwali, Gond Mahal in Islamnagar, Shaurya Smarak, Tajul Masajid, Bhopal, Van Vihar National Park, AIIMS Bhopal

- Location of Bhopal district in Madhya Pradesh
- Country: India
- State: Madhya Pradesh
- Division: Bhopal
- Headquarters: Bhopal

Government
  - Lok Sabha constituencies: Bhopal
  - Collector & District Magistrate: Avinash Lavania IAS

Area
  - Total: 2,772 km^{2} (1,070 sq mi)

Population (2011)
  - Total: 2,371,061
  - Density: 855.4/km^{2} (2,215/sq mi)
  - Urban: 1,917,051

Demographics
  - Literacy: 82.3%
  - Sex ratio: 911/1000
- Time zone: UTC+05:30 (IST)
- Vehicle registration: MP 04
- Website: bhopal.nic.in, smartbhopal.city

Bhopal district (Hindi: भोपाल ज़िला, Hindi pronunciation: [bʱoːpaːl zɪlaː]) is a district of Madhya Pradesh state in central India. The city of Bhopal serves as its administrative headquarters. The district is part of Bhopal Division.

== History ==
Bhopal district was carved out of the erstwhile Sehore District of Bhopal division vide M.P.Govt. Notification No.2477/1977/Sa/One/ dated 13 September 1972.The district derives its name from the district head-quarters town Bhopal which is also the capital of Madhya Pradesh. According to the Imperial Gazetteer of India, Bhopal derives from "Bhoj Pal" named after the legendary founder of the city.

The early history of the present-day district area is obscure. According to a legend, the area was part of Mahakautar, a barrier of dense forests and hills separating North India from South India. 10th century CE onwards, names of Rajput rulers (including Bhoja) Malwa appear in the historical records. The number of Muslims rose after invasions by the Delhi Sultanate under Iltutmish. In 1401, Dilawar Khan Ghori (father of Hoshang Shah) took control of the territory, ruling from Dhar.

In the 14th century, a Gond warrior Yadoram established a kingdom headquartered at Garh-Mandla. At the time of Mughal invasion of Malwa in 1561, the area was subdivided into territories known as chaklas. The present-day Bhopal district was part of the Ginnor chakla, which comprised 750 villages. The Gond warlord Nizam Shah controlled these villages from his fort of Ginnorgarh. After his death, the Afghan mercenary Dost Mohammad Khan managed the state's affairs on behalf of his widow Kamlapati. After her death, Khan usurped the territory, and acquired neighbouring territories to establish the Bhopal princely state. He founded the town of Islamnagar, and also established the modern city of Bhopal. His son Yar Mohammad Khan paid tribute to the Marathas. After his death, there was a war of secession between Sultan Mohammad Khan and Faiz Mohammad Khan, during which the Nawabs of Bhopal had to cede some territories to the Marathas. Faiz was a religious recluse, and his step-mother Mamola Bai effectively ruled the state on his behalf. His successors maintained good relations with the East India Company, which eventually came to rule India.

Between 1819 and 1926, Bhopal was ruled by four female rulers, including Shah Jahan Begum and Sultan Jahan, Begum of Bhopal. After independence of India, her son Hamidullah Khan expressed his wish to retain Bhopal as an independent unit, leading to public protests. On 30 April 1949, the Nawab relented and signed an Instrument of Accession to the Dominion of India. The state was taken over by Government of India on 1 June 1949, resulting in the formation of Bhopal State (1949–56).

After the States Reorganisation Act of 1956, Bhopal state was integrated into the Sehore district of the newly formed state of Madhya Pradesh. The Bhopal city was declared as the capital of Madhya Pradesh. On 26 January 1972, the Government of Madhya Pradesh announced that Bhopal would be made a separate district. The Bhopal district was officially carved out of the Sehore district on 26 November 1972.

== Geography ==
Bhopal

Climate chart (precipitation, max. and min. temperature)
J	F	M	A	M	J	J	A	S	O	N	D
13 25 10	7.8 29 12	7.2 34 17	4.5 38 22	8 41 26	114 37 25	356 31 23	388 29 22	196 31 21	26 32 18	14 29 14	12 26 11
- █ Average max. and min. temperatures in °C
- █ Precipitation totals in mm
- Source: IMD
Imperial conversion
J	F	M	A	M	J	J	A	S	O	N	D
0.5 78 50	0.3 83 54	0.3 92 63	0.2 101 71	0.3 105 78	4.5 99 78	14 87 74	15 84 72	7.7 87 71	1 90 65	0.5 84 57	0.5 79 52
- █ Average max. and min. temperatures in °F
- █ Precipitation totals in inches

The district has an area of 2,772 km^{2}.

Bhopal District is bounded by the districts of Guna to the north, Vidisha to the northeast, Raisen to the east and southeast, Sehore to the southwest and west, and Rajgarh to the northwest.

The city of Bhopal lies in the southern part of the district, and the majority of the population resides within Bhopal municipality. The town of Berasia lies in the northern part of the district.

== Demographics ==
Historical population
Year	Pop.	±% p.a.
1901	143,958	—
1911	156,354	+0.83%
1921	140,300	−1.08%
1931	163,747	+1.56%
1941	188,608	+1.42%
1951	235,665	+2.25%
1961	371,715	+4.66%
1971	572,169	+4.41%
1981	894,739	+4.57%
1991	1,351,479	+4.21%
2001	1,843,510	+3.15%
2011	2,371,061	+2.55%

Religions in Bhopal district (2011)
Religion	Percent
Hinduism	74.05%
Islam	22.16%
Jainism	1.09%
Christianity	0.99%
Buddhism	0.91%
Other or not stated	0.80%

According to the 2011 census, Bhopal District has a population of 2,371,061, roughly equal to the nation of Latvia or the US state of New Mexico. This gives it a ranking of 189th in India (out of a total of 640).

The district has a population density of 855 inhabitants per square kilometre (2,210/sq mi). Its population growth rate over the decade 2001-2011 was 28.46%. Bhopal has a sex ratio of 918 females for every 1000 males, and a literacy rate of 80.37%. 80.85% of the population lives in urban areas. Scheduled Castes and Scheduled Tribes make up 15.08% and 2.93% of the population respectively.

Languages of Bhopal district (2011)
1. Hindi (84.7%)
2. Urdu (6.76%)
3. Marathi (2.61%)
4. Sindhi (2.23%)
5. Others (3.73%)

At the time of the 2011 Census of India, 84.67% of the population in the district spoke Hindi, 6.76% Urdu, 2.61% Marathi and 2.23% Sindhi as their first language.

== Places of interest ==
- Van Vihar National Park
- Upper Lake (Bhojtal)
- Indira Gandhi Rashtriya Manav Sangrahalaya
- Gohar Mahal
- Birla Mandir
- Tribal Museum
- Regional Science Center
- Taj-ul-Masajid
- Kerwa Dam
- Bhadbhada Dam

== Subdivisions ==
The Bhopal district has three tehsils: Berasia Kolar and Huzur. There are two community development blocks: Berasia and Phanda. The two tehsils are further sub-divided into units known as Patwari Halkas.

=== Cities and towns ===
Berasia tehsil:

1. Berasia (municipality)

Huzur tehsil

1. Bhopal (municipal corporation)
2. Kolar (municipality)

In 2019, Kolar was declared a separate tehsil.
