= Bhopal State =

Islamic principality in India (1708–1949)

Coordinates: 23°15′N 77°24′E

- 1707–1949
- Flags Coat of arms
- Motto: "Nasr min Allah" (Victory from Allah)
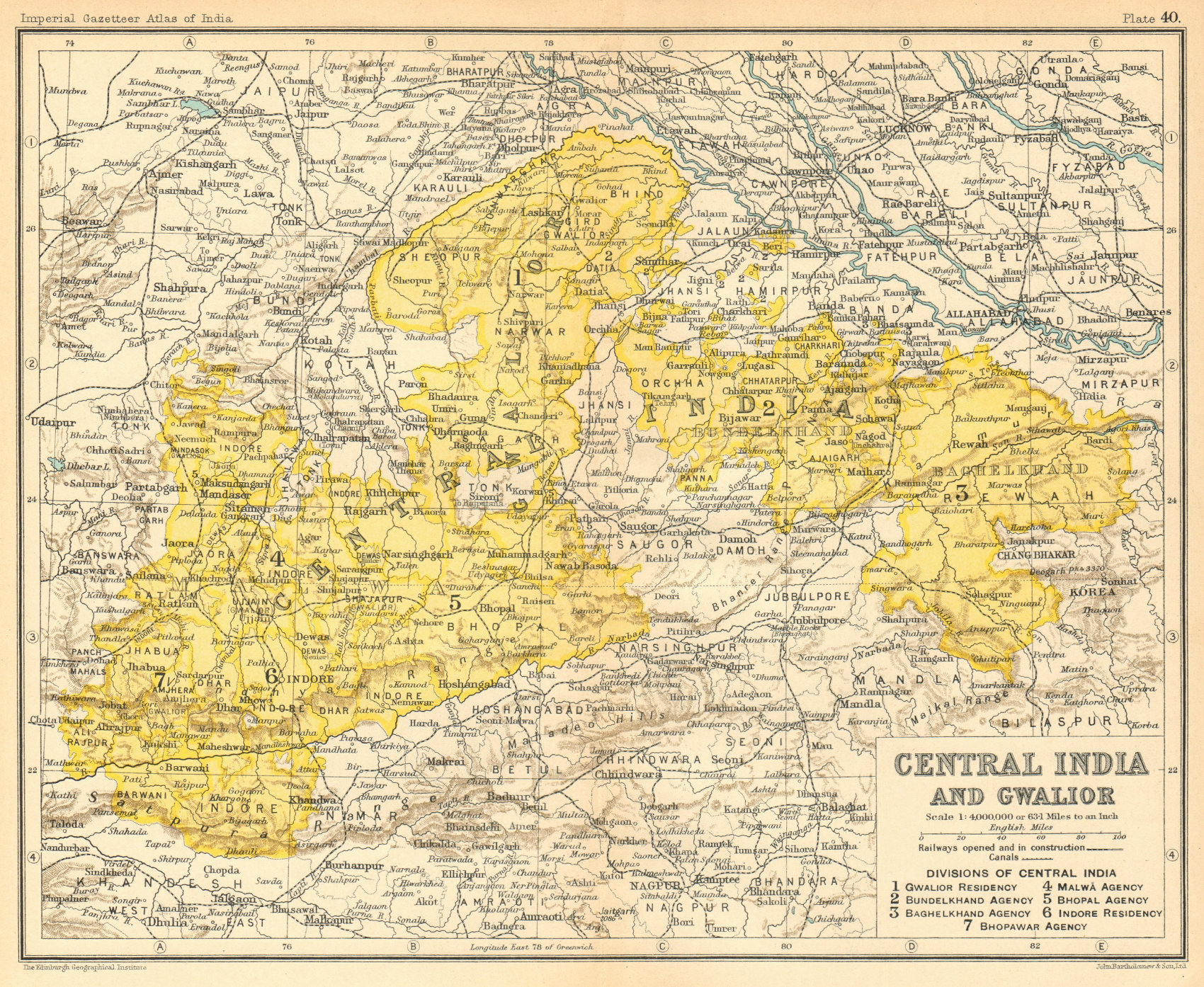
- Bhopal State as a part of the Central India Agency.
- Status: State within the Maratha Confederacy (1737-1818); Princely state of India (1818–1947); Unrecognised state (1947–1949)
- Capital: Bhopal (1707-1728, 1742-1949), Islamnagar (1728-1742)
- Common languages: Persian (Official) and Hindustani
- Religion: Islam (official); Hinduism (majority)
- Government: Islamic principality
- Nawab of Bhopal
  - 1707–1728: Dost Mohammad Khan (first)
  - 1926–1949: Hamidullah Khan (last)
- History
  - Established: 1707
  - Disestablished: 1 June 1949

Area
- 1901: 17,876 km^{2} (6,902 sq mi)
Preceded by	Succeeded by
Maratha Empire	Bhopal State (1949–1956)
- Today part of: Madhya Pradesh, India
- Statistics from Furber 1951, p. 367

Bhopal State (pronounced [bʱoːpaːl]) was an Islamic principality, founded in the beginning of 18th-century India by the Afghan Mughal noble Dost Muhammad Khan. It was a tributary state within the Maratha Empire during the 18th century (1737–1818), a princely state with rights to a 19-gun salute in a subsidiary alliance with British India from 1818 to 1947, and an independent state from 1947 to 1949. Islamnagar was founded and served as the State's first capital, which was later shifted to the city of Bhopal.

The state was founded in 1707 by Dost Mohammad Khan, a Pashtun soldier in the Mughal army, who became a mercenary after the Emperor Aurangzeb's death and annexed several territories to his fiefdom. It came under the suzerainty of the Nizam of Hyderabad in 1723 shortly after its foundation. In 1737, the Marathas defeated the Mughals and the Nawab of Bhopal in the Battle of Bhopal, and started collecting tribute from the state. After the defeat of the Marathas in the Third Anglo-Maratha War, Bhopal became a British princely state in 1818. The state was merged into the Union of India in 1949 as Bhopal. In 1901 the state had a population of 665,961 people occupying 6,902 sq. miles of land and an average revenue of Rs. 25,00,000.

Bhopal state was unique for a continuous lineage of four female Nawabs who ruled its throne for over a century between 1819 and 1926. During this period, the state was noteworthy for its immense contributions to the development of Islamic religious activities, cultural reform and educational efforts which caused a growing appreciation for its rulers in Indian political circles. Some of the Islamic revival activities of the Bhopal state were met with disapproval by the British authorities.

== History ==
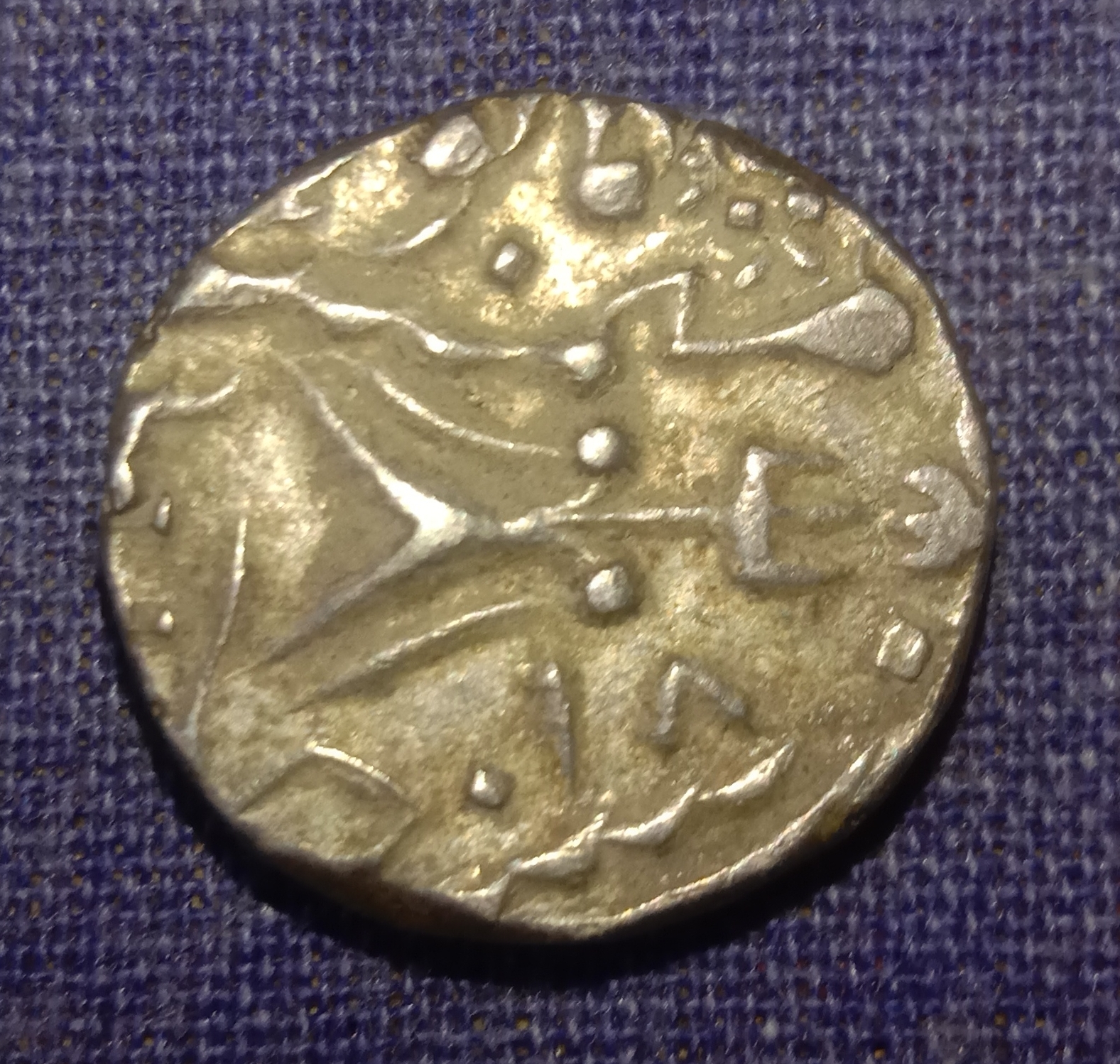
Silver Rupee of Bhopal State struck in the name of Mughal emperor Akbar II, minted in Daulatgarh, having the trident symbol in horizontal position.

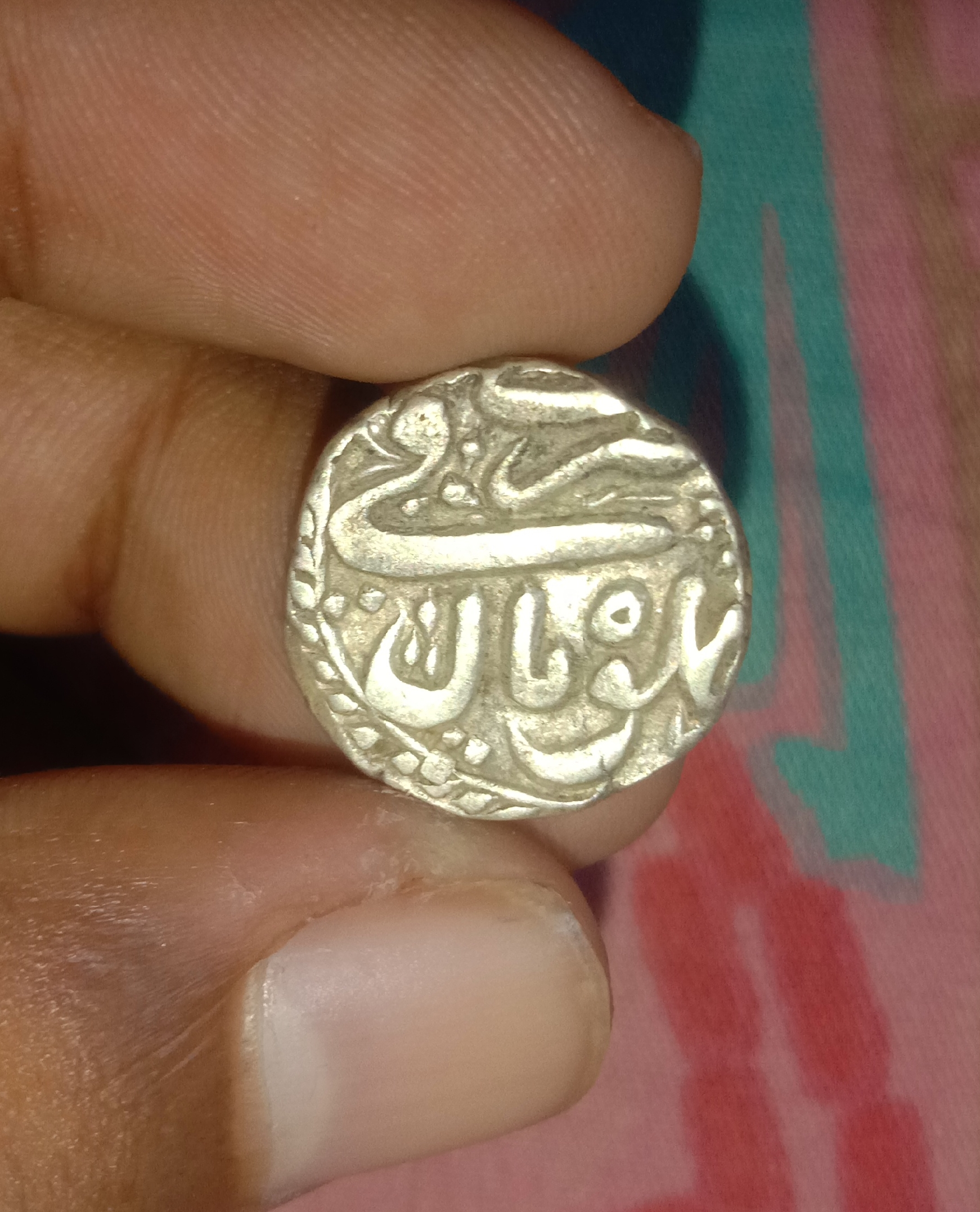
Silver Rupee coin from the princely state of Bhopal, struck in the name of Nawab Sikander Begum.

=== Establishment ===
The State of Bhopal was established by Dost Mohammad Khan (1672–1728), a pashtun soldier in the Mughal Army. After the death of the emperor Aurangzeb, Khan started providing mercenary services to several local chieftains in the politically unstable Malwa region. In 1709, he took on the lease of the Berasia estate. Later, he usurped the Rajput principality of Mangalgarh and the Gond kingdom of Rani Kamlapati, after the death of their female rulers to whom he had been providing mercenary services. He also annexed several other territories in Malwa to his state.

During the early 1720s, Khan founded the city of Bhopal into a fortified city and assumed the title of Nawab. Khan became close to the Sayyid Brothers, who had become highly influential king-makers in the Mughal court. Khan's support to the Sayyids earned him the enmity of the rival Mughal nobleman Nizam-ul-Mulk, who invaded Bhopal in March 1724, forcing Khan to cede much of his territory, give up his son as a hostage, and accept the Nizam's suzerainty.

Dost Mohammad Khan and his Pakhtun Orakzai dynasty brought Islamic influence to the culture and architecture in the foundation of Bhopal. Aside from the city of Bhopal, which was his capital, Dost Mohammad Khan also renovated the nearby fort of Jagdishpur and renamed it Islamnagar. Yet, Dost Mohammad was fated to suffer defeat in his declining years. After Khan's death in 1728, the Bhopal state remained under the influence of the Orakzai dynasty.

In 1737, Marathas under the leadership of Peshwa Baji Rao I, defeated the forces of the Mughals and the Nawab of Bhopal in the Battle of Bhopal. Following the victory of the Marathas, Bhopal came under the suzerainty of the Maratha Empire as a semi-autonomous state and remained so until the Third Anglo-Maratha War in 1818.

Dost Mohammad Khan's son and successor, Nawab Yar Mohammad Khan (r.1728-1742), moved the capital from Bhopal to Islamnagar. However, his successor, Nawab Faiz Muhammed Khan (r.1742–1777), moved back to Bhopal, which would remain the capital of Bhopal State until its fall in 1949. Faiz Muhammad Khan was a religious recluse, and the state was effectively ruled by his influential stepmother Mamola Bai.

The state became a British protectorate in 1818 after the Third Anglo-Maratha War and was ruled by the Orakzai descendants of Dost Mohammad Khan until 1949, when it was annexed by the Dominion of India after a popular revolt against the ruling dynasty.

=== Early rulers ===
A procession of Shia Muslims in Bhopal in the Mughal Empire.

By the 1730s, Marathas under the leadership of Peshwa Baji Rao I, defeated the forces of the Mughals and the Nawab of Bhopal in the Battle of Bhopal. Following the victory of the Marathas, Bhopal came under the suzerainty of the Maratha Empire as a semi-autonomous state.

The Marathas conquered several nearby states, including Indore to the west and Gwalior to the north, but Bhopal remained a Muslim-ruled state under Dost Mohammed Khan's successors. Subsequently, Nawab Wazir Mohammed Khan, a general, created a stable semi-autonomous state.

Nawab Jahangir Mohammed Khan established a cantonment at a distance of one mile from the fort. This was called Jahangirabad after him. He built gardens and barracks for British guests and soldiers in Jahangirabad.

In 1778, during the First Anglo-Maratha War, when the British General Thomas Goddard campaigned across India, Bhopal was one of the few states that reached out to the British. In 1809, during the Second Anglo-Maratha War, General Close led a British expedition to Central India. The Nawab of Bhopal petitioned in vain to be received under British protection. In 1817, when the Third Anglo-Maratha War broke out, a treaty of dependence was signed between the British Government of India and the Nawab of Bhopal. Bhopal remained a friend of British Government during the British Raj in India.

In February–March 1818, Bhopal became a princely state in British India as a result of the Anglo-Bhopal treaty between the East India Company and Nawab Nazar Muhammad (Nawab of Bhopal during 1816–1819). Bhopal state included the present-day Bhopal, Raisen, and Sehore districts, and was part of the Central India Agency. It straddled the Vindhya Range, with the northern portion lying on the Malwa plateau, and the southern portion lying in the valley of the Narmada River, which formed the state's southern boundary. Bhopal Agency was formed as an administrative section of Central India, consisting the Bhopal state and some princely states to the northeast, including Khilchipur, Narsingarh, Rajgarh, and after 1931 the Dewas states. It was administered by an agent to the British Governor-General of India.

=== The rule of the Begums ===
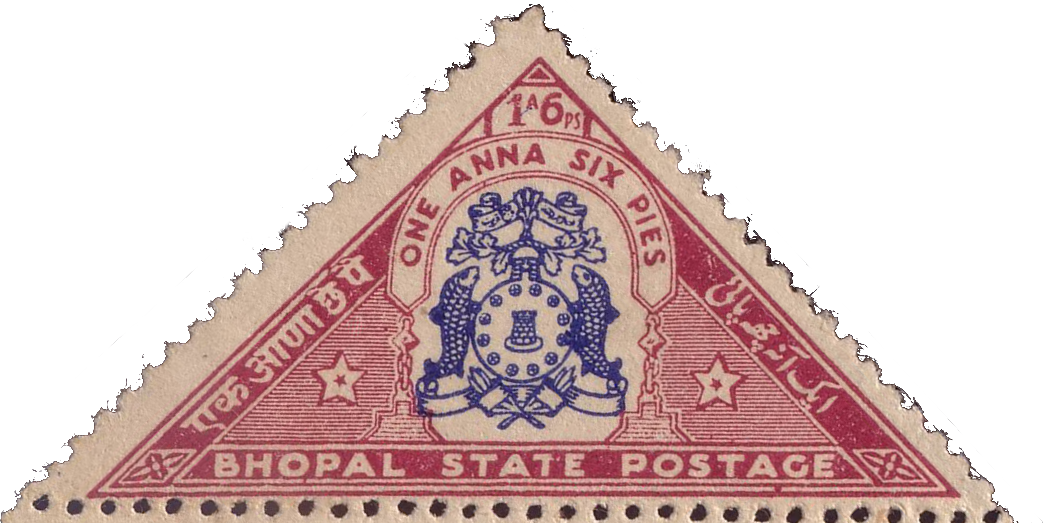
The Bhopal State postal service was introduced during the rule of the Begums.

Between 1819 and 1926, it was ruled by four women – Begums – unique in the royalty of those days. Qudsia Begum was the first woman ruler, who was succeeded by her only daughter Sikandar Begum, who in turn was succeeded by her only daughter, Shah Jahan Begum. Sultan Shah Jahan Begum was the last women ruler, who after 25 years of rule, abdicated in favour of her son, Hamidullah Khan. The rule of Begums gave the city its waterworks, railways, a postal system and a municipality constituted in 1907.

During this period, Bhopal state became a major hub of religious leaders and activists of the so-called Indian "Wahhabi" movement (the followers of Sayyid Ahmad Shahid) such as Munshi Jamal al-Din, Siddiq Hasan Khan, Abdul Jabbar, Abdul Rahman and Ali Karim. Siddiq Hasan Khan would eventually rise to position of virtual ruler of the state after his marriage to the widowed Shah Jahan Begum in 1870; resulting in the ascendancy of the Ahl-i Hadith movement. Various Islamic educational and political reforms were initiated by Khan and the doctrines of the Ahl-i Hadith became the state religion under his reign.

==== Qudsia Begum ====
In 1819, 18-year-old Qudsia Begum (also known as Gohar Begum) took over the reins after the assassination of her husband. She was the first female ruler of Bhopal. She refused to follow the purdah tradition. She declared that her 2-year-old daughter Sikander will follow her as the ruler. None of the male family members dared to challenge her decision. She cared very well for her subjects and took her dinners only after receiving the news every night that all her subjects had taken meals. She built the Jama Masjid (mosque) and her beautiful palace the 'Gohar Mahal'(also called Nazar Bagh) in Bhopal. She ruled till 1837 when she died having adequately prepared her daughter for ruling the state.

==== Sikander Jahan Begum ====
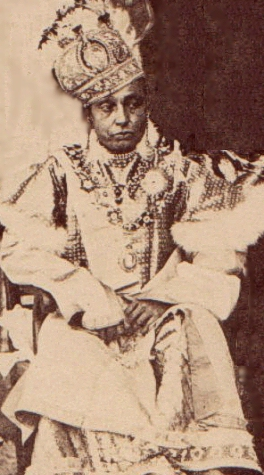
Sikandar Begum

In 1844, Sikander Begum succeeded her mother as the ruler of Bhopal.

During the Indian rebellion of 1857, she sided with the British and crushed all those who revolted against them. She did a lot of public welfare too – she built roads and reconstructed the fort. She also built the Moti Masjid (meaning the Pearl Mosque) and Moti Mahal (the Pearl Palace).

==== Indian Rebellion of 1857 ====
During the Indian Rebellion of 1857, the Bhopal state sided with the East India Company, as per the treaty of 1818. The rebellion in Bhopal and neighbouring areas was suppressed by Sikander Begum in its initial stages.

By June 1857, the rebellion had spread to neighbouring areas of Bhopal, such as Indore, Mhow, and Neemuch. In the beginning of July 1857, Sikandar Begum was informed by Bakhshi Murawwat Mohammed Khan Nasrat Jang, that the rebel forces from neighbouring areas were marching towards Bhopal. She asked Khan to repulse the rebel forces from Mhow.

In some of the mosques of Bhopal, the rebellion against the East India Company was declared as jihad by the Maulvis and the Pathans. The rebels maintained contacts with Rani Lakshmibai of Jhansi, Tatya Tope, the Nawab of Tonk, Nawab of Banda and others. They also acknowledged Bahadur Shah Zafar as the emperor of India, and sent offerings to Delhi in form of horses and cash.

It was reported that the rebels were mobilising people for revolt by spreading messages through chapatis in villages. Sikander Begum banned the distribution of these chapatis from village to village. She required undertakings from the balahi and patel (chiefs) of every village, to report any violations to the concerned thana (police station). Sikandar Begum also banned the circulation of any seditious notices either found lying on the road or stuck on the walls. Maulvi Abdul Qayyum, the darogha of Fatehgarh fort distributed 500 copies of a pamphlet issued by the rebels of Cawnpore (now Kanpur). The pamphlet claimed that the British were interfering with the religious sentiments of Hindus and Muslims, and urged them to rebel against the British rule in India. Sikandar Begum instituted an inquiry against the Maulvi, who was charged of collusion with the rebels. She also published a pamphlet from Sikandari press, denying the charges of British interference in the religious affairs of Hindus and Muslims.

The Bhopal state had an army under the direct command of British officers, raised under the Anglo-Bhopal treaty of 1818, and consisting of 600 cavalry and 400 infantry. When the signs of a rebellion started appearing in the army, Major William Henry Richards (the Political Agent at Bhopal) and other British officers withdrew to a safer place at Hoshangabad near Bhopal, leaving the matter under the direct charge of the Begum. Mama Qahhar Khan, the jamadar in the Vilayatian Regiment, and the sepoys under him refused to accept their pay, and revolted; they were punished by being discharged from the service.

In the Berasia tehsil of Bhopal, the rebel leaders Shajaat Khan Pindari and Jahangir Muhammad Khan raised a small force consisting of 70 sepoys. They launched an attack on Berasia on 14 July 1857. The rebels looted the township, and killed Babu Subh Rao (the assistant Political Agent), Munshi Mukhdum Bakhsh and other British loyalists. They also plundered the local treasury and seized the assets of the state officers they had killed. They were supported by some sepoys from the Bhopal Contingent stationed at Berasia. Sikandar Begum took measures against the rebels in Berasia and neighbouring areas, forcing them to flee. Shajaat Khan Pindari had plans to flee and join Fazil Muhammad Khan, the jagirdar of Garhi Ambapani, or Prince Bhawani Singh of Narsingarh. However, he was arrested with help of spies, and brought to the Sehore jail along with his followers. He and his son were hanged near idgah of the town, and then buried beneath a mahua tree by some sweepers.

On 6 August 1857, Risaldar Wali Shah and Kotha-Havaldar Mahavir declared a sepoy rebellion at Sehore cantonment near Bhopal. They pronounced the symbols of revolt as the Nishan-i-Muhammadi ("the symbol of Muhammad", for Muslims) and the Nishan-i-Mahaviri ("the symbol of Mahavir", for Hindus). The rebel sepoys decided to collect at least Rs. 200,000 from the Mahajans of Sehore, by foul or fair means. The rebel leader Mahavir looted Rs. 700 from the state treasury of the Sehore tehsil. They also ransacked and burned the bungalows of the British officers, and made attempts to plunder arms and ammunitions from the magazine.

In the Piklon tehsil of Bhopal, the rebellion was led by Muhammad Abu Saeed Khan (popularly known as Nawab of Itarsiwala), Raja Chhatarsal of Agra, Aqil Muhammad Khan, Fazil Muhammad Khan and Adil Muhammad Khan of Garhi Ambapani. The rebel leaders planned to occupy the town. Sikander Begum sought help from the Scindia Maharaja of Gwalior to defeat the rebels, but the rebel army consisting of around 300 men attacked Piklon. The small state force was forced to retreat, and the tehsildar of Piklon fled to Scindia's territory. The rebels plundered the Piklon town, and neighbouring villages such as Chopra, Bisraha and Bisrai. They also established a thana (station) at Piklon. However, they were soon ousted by the state forces.

==== Shah Jahan Begum ====
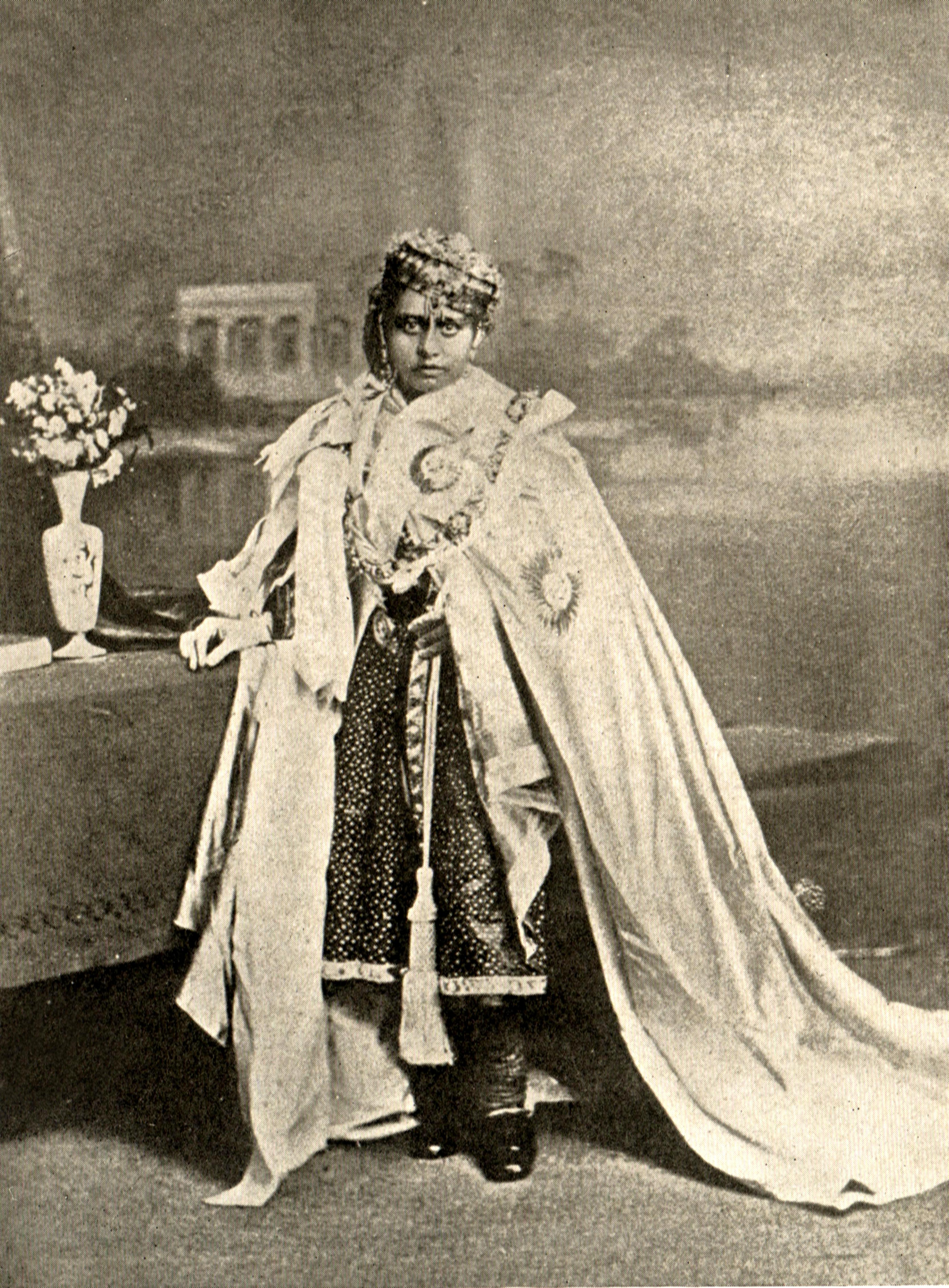
A young Shah Jahan Begum

Sikander Begum's successor Shah Jahan Begum (begum 1844–60, Sikandar Begum being regent; ruled 1868–1901) was quite passionate about architecture, like her Mughal namesake emperor Shah Jahan. She built a vast mini-city, called Shahjahanabad after her. She also built a new palace for herself, the Taj Mahal (not to be confused with the famous Taj Mahal at Agra). She built many other beautiful buildings as well, including Ali Manzil, Amir Ganj, Barah Mahal, Ali Manzil, Be nazir Complex, Khawasoura, Mughalpura, Nematpua and Nawab Manzils. Today, one can see the ruins of Taj Mahal and some of the parts that have stood the test of time; Barah Mahal and Nawab Manzil have also stood the test of time. During her rule, in 1900, the complete failure of the monsoon rains led to a severe famine in Bhopal. Most notable among the achievements of Shah Jahan Begum was that under her rule the economy flourished. During this period Bhopal had the highest GDP contribution towards the Indian economy mainly due to its superior craftsmanship and rich gold works.

==== Kaikhusrau Jahan Begum ====
Sultan Kaikhusrau Jahan Begum, GCSI, GCIE, GBE, CI, KIH (9 July 1858 – 12 May 1930) daughter of Shah Jahan Begum, succeeded her in 1901, ruling to her abdication in favour of her son in 1926. She further advanced the emancipation of women and established a modern municipality in 1903. She had her own palace Sadar Manzil (the present headquarters of Bhopal Municipal Corporation); yet preferred the quiet and serene environment at the outskirts of the city. She developed her own walled mini-city, named Ahmedabad after her late husband (not to be confused with Ahmedabad, Gujarat). This city was situated at Tekri Maulvee Zai-ud-din, which was at located a distance of a mile from the fort. She built a palace called Qaser-e-Sultani (now Saifia College). This area became a posh residency as royalty and elite moved here. The Begum installed the first water pump here and developed a garden called 'Zie-up-Abser'. She also constructed a new palace called 'Noor-us-Sabah', which has been converted into a heritage hotel. She was the first president of the All India Conference on Education and first chancellor of the Aligarh Muslim University.

The peaceful rule of Begums led to the rise of a unique mixed culture in Bhopal. The Hindus were given important administrative positions in the state. This led to communal peace and a cosmopolitan culture took its roots.

=== After Indian independence ===
Sultan Kaikhusrau Jahan Begum's son, Nawab Hamidullah Khan, ascended the throne in 1926. He was Chancellor of the Chamber of Princes. He was the last ruling nawab of Bhopal. An active member of the independence movement, Hamidullah Khan was a delegate at the Round Table Conference from 1930 to 1932, an active member of the All-India Muslim League, and a close political ally of Muhammad Ali Jinnah. However, like the rulers of Kashmir, Hyderabad, Sikkim, and others, he desired to maintain his state's autonomy. Bhopal, along with Hyderabad and Travancore, became one of the Indian princely states which officially refused to join either the Dominion of India or the Dominion of Pakistan. As a Muslim ruler in Central India, Hamidullah Khan opposed the Partition of India, in part because he feared it would marginalise Muslims outside West or East Pakistan, and instead sought regional Muslim autonomy within India.

Hamidullah Khan expressed his wish to retain Bhopal as a separate independent state in March 1948. Agitations against the Nawab broke out in December 1948, leading to the arrest of prominent leaders including Bhai Ratan Kumar Gupta and Shankar Dayal Sharma, the future president of India on 5 & 6 January 1949 respectively. Sharma was sentenced to eight months imprisonment for violating restrictions on public meetings; some other satyagrahis like Ram charan Rai, Biharilal Ghatt, Thakur Lalsingh, Laxminarayan Sinhal were also arrested. Amidst the Vilinikaran Andolan, many were shot dead by the Nawabi police, including the martyrs of Boras. Sardar Patel took the situation seriously, sent V P Menon for the Merger Agreement negotiations on 23 January 1949. Later, in February 1949, the political detainees were released and the Nawab Bhopal had to sign the agreement for merger on 30 April 1949.

The Bhopal princely state was taken over by the Union Government of India on 1 June 1949. The new Bhopal State was declared a "Part C" state, governed by a chief commissioner appointed by the President of India. Sindhi refugees from Pakistan were accommodated in Bairagarh, a western suburb of Bhopal.

The eldest daughter of Nawab Hamidullah Khan and presumptive heiress, Abida Sultan, gave up her right to the throne and opted for Pakistan in 1950. Therefore, the Government of India excluded her from the succession and her younger sister Begum Sajida succeeded in her stead. In 1971, all princely titles and privy purses were abolished by the Indian government.

== List of rulers of Bhopal ==
- Nawab Dost Mohammad Khan (1707–1728). Afghan adventurer with a flair for opportunism and intrigue, and few if any scruples. Came to India as a youth, took service in the Mughal army, and later founded Bhopal State during the anarchy following the death of emperor Aurangzeb.
- Sultan Muhammad Khan (1728–1742). Born 1720, legitimate son of Dost Mohammad. Succeeded aged eight under the regency of his much older half-brother. Attempted to seize real power in 1742 when the regent died, but was defeated by the regent's family. Abdicated the throne in return for an estate.

- Nawab Yar Mohammad Khan (regent and de facto ruler, 1728-42). Eldest but illegitimate son of Dost Mohammad. Never proclaimed himself ruler.

- Nawab Faiz Mohammad Khan (1742–1777). Eldest son of regent Yar Mohammad. A religious and unworldly man, he left administration to his step-mother, Mamola Bai, a lady of Rajput birth who had been instrumental in securing the throne for him. No children.
- Nawab Hayat Mohammad Khan (1777–1807). Second son of Yar Mohammad. When besieged by the Marathas in 1795, he sought the help of a distant but agnatic cousin, Wazir Mohammad, and later put him in charge of administration. Thus did Wazir Khan, ancestor of the future royal family, gain ascendency in the Bhopal court.
- Nawab Ghous Mohammad Khan (1807–1826). Son of Hayat Mohammad and father of Begum Qudsia. He lost confidence in himself after losing battles to the Marathas in the first few months of his reign. He remained Nawab till his death, but appointed Wazir Mohammad as regent and himself lived quietly at Raisen on a pension.

- ("Regent" and de facto ruler) Nawab Wazir Mohammad Khan (reign of Ghous Mohammad Khan) – (1807–1816)
- ("Regent" and de facto ruler) Nawab Nazir Mohammad Khan (born 1793, tenure 1816–1819) - Second son of Wazir Mohammad Khan. Succeeded his father as regent and quickly became a favourite of Nawab Ghous Mohammad, who gave him his daughter Qudsia in marriage. During his brief tenure, Bhopal entered into subsidiary alliance with the British and regained significant territory as part of the agreement. He died aged 26 in a gun-related accident, leaving only one daughter.
- Qudsia Begum (born 1801, tenure 1819–1837, died 1881). Daughter of Nawab Ghous Mohammad and widow of regent Nazir Mohammad. She was nominally declared regent upon the death of her husband in 1819, but real power was shared between her father and Amir Mohammad, the elder brother of her late husband.

- Nawab Muiz Muhammad Khan (1826 – 1837), son of Ghous Mohammad. Powerless puppet ruler. Summarily deposed in 1837, died 1854.
- Nawab Jahangir Mohammad Khan (husband of Sikandar Jahan Begum) – (1837–1844)
- Nawab Sikander Jahan Begum (1860–1868)
- Nawab Sultan Shah Jahan Begum (1844–1860 and 1868–1901)
- Kaikhusrau Jahan, Begum of Bhopal (1901–1926)
- Nawab Hamidullah Khan (1926–1949)

== See also ==
- Bhopal State postal service
- Ghulam Mansoor, a Subedar-Major in the Bhopal State
- Mahseer in heraldry
- Political integration of India
- Pathans of Madhya Pradesh
- Orakzai, the ruling dynasty of Bhopal

== Bibliography ==
- Furber, Holden (1951), "The Unification of India, 1947–1951", Pacific Affairs, 24 (4): 352–371, doi:10.2307/2753451, JSTOR 2753451
