= Chaman Zar =

Chaman Zar (Persian: چمن زار) may refer to:

- Chaman Zar-e Olya
- Chaman Zar-e Sofla
