= Chaman bombing =

Chaman bombing may refer to these attacks in Chaman, Balochistan, Pakistan during the insurgency in Balochistan:

- 2017 Chaman suicide bombing
- 2021 Chaman bombings

== See also ==
- Chaman (disambiguation)
