= Kolar, Madhya Pradesh =

Town in Madhya Pradesh, India

Coordinates: 23.1096°N 77.4029°E

Kolar is a town and municipality in Bhopal District of Madhya Pradesh in India. It's also a tehsil headquarter.

== Demographics ==
As per Census of India 2011 Kolar Municipality has population of 87,882 of which 45,692 are males while 42,190 are females.

Religion in Kolar
1. Hinduism (89.5%)
2. Islam (4.93%)
3. Christian (2.16%)
4. other (4.16%)
