= Taj Mahal (palace) =

Royal residential palace in Bhopal, India

Taj Mahal Palace
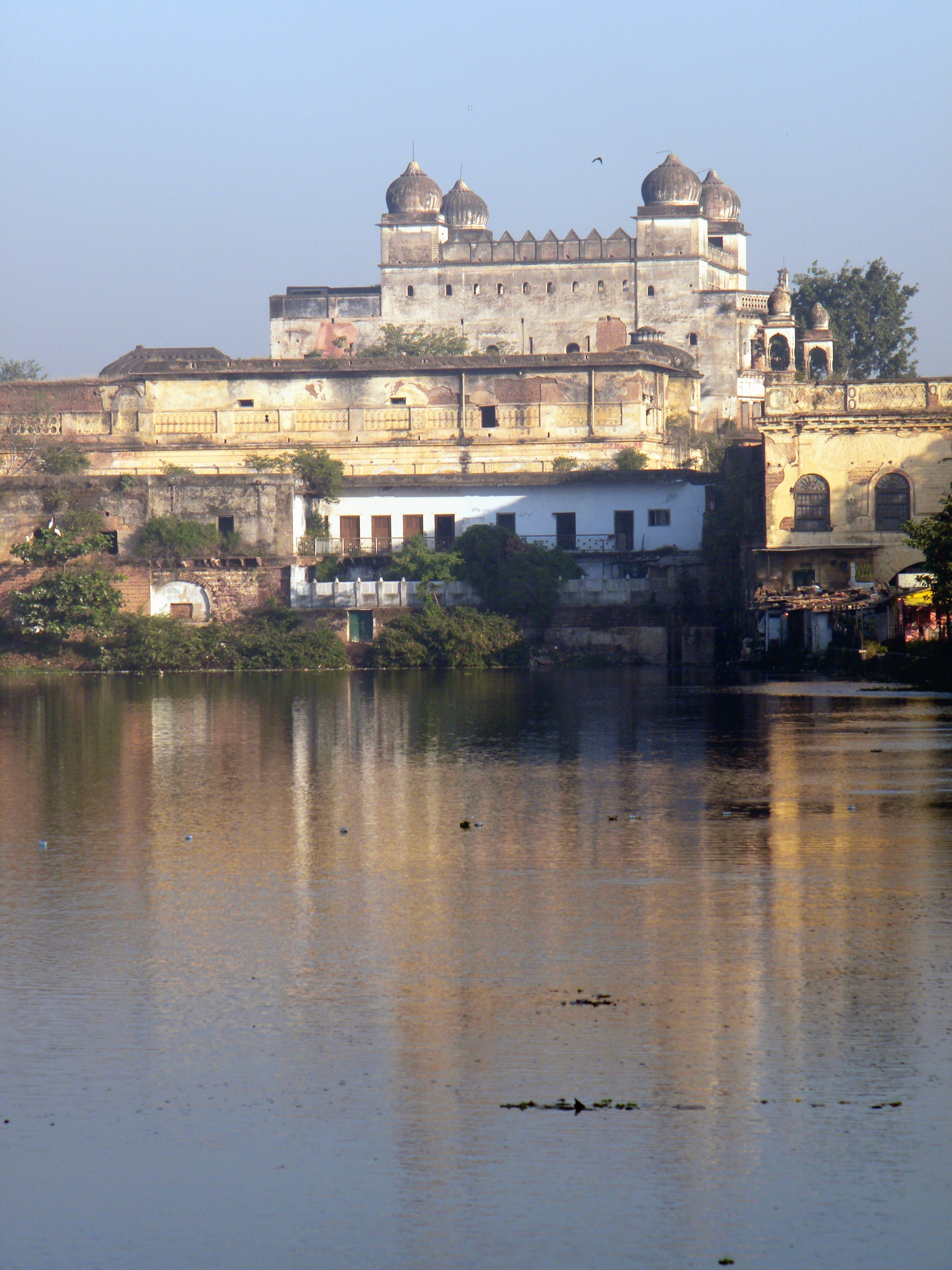
- Interactive map of the Taj Mahal Palace area

General information
- Location: Bhopal, India
- Coordinates: 23°15′N 77°25′E
- Construction started: 1871
- Completed: 1884
- Cost: ₹30 lakhs
- Client: Sultan Shah Jahan, Begum of Bhopal

Taj Mahal is a palace built by Sultan Shah Jahan, Begum of Bhopal. It is located beside the Taj-ul-Masajid in Bhopal, India.

== History ==
The Taj Mahal at Bhopal was built as the Begum's residence, at a cost of ₹ 3,000,000. Its construction spanned over a period of 13 years, from 1871 to 1884. It was one of the largest palaces of the world built at that time.

The building was originally named Raj Mahal ("royal palace"). The British Resident at Bhopal, highly impressed with the architecture, suggested that the palace be renamed the Taj Mahal, the Taj Mahal at Agra having been built by the Begum's namesake Shah Jahan. The begum accepted the suggestion and the palace was renamed to Taj Mahal. The Begum is said to have ordered a three-year-long celebration called Jashn-e-Taj Mahal after the completion of the building.

After the partition of India in 1947, Nawab Hamidullah Khan allowed Sindhi refugees to stay in the palace. They stayed in Taj Mahal for around 4 years, before shifting to Bairagarh. The palace suffered some damage during this period. After India's independence, some members of the royal family of Bhopal stayed at the palace, but gradually moved away, as they had no money for the repairs. By 2008, large parts of the palace complex had collapsed.

The palace was declared a state heritage monument by the Government of Madhya Pradesh in 2005 and the state archaeology department carried out restoration in parts. However, it was de-notified in 2011. Until 2013, the Taj Mahal was under the archives department. In 2014 the monument was handled over to the Madhya Pradesh tourism department.

In 2017, a private builder from Indore, was handed over the property on lease to develop the sprawling 19th century structure into a 120-room heritage hotel. As of 2023 the work is yet to be started.

== Architecture ==
The architecture of Taj Mahal has British, French, Mughal, Arabic and Hindu influences. The palace contains 120 rooms, a hall of mirrors or sheesh mahal and the savon bhadon pavilion, an elaborate fountain like structure that simulated the effect of rain. The main entrance is a seven-storied structure. The palace was part of a complex of buildings along the three lakes that includes the Benazir Palace, which was the begum's summer palace, and the Taj-ul-Masjid Mosque. The palace has been built in the Indo-Saracenic style and is kept cool by the winds blowing in from the lakes.

== Gallery ==
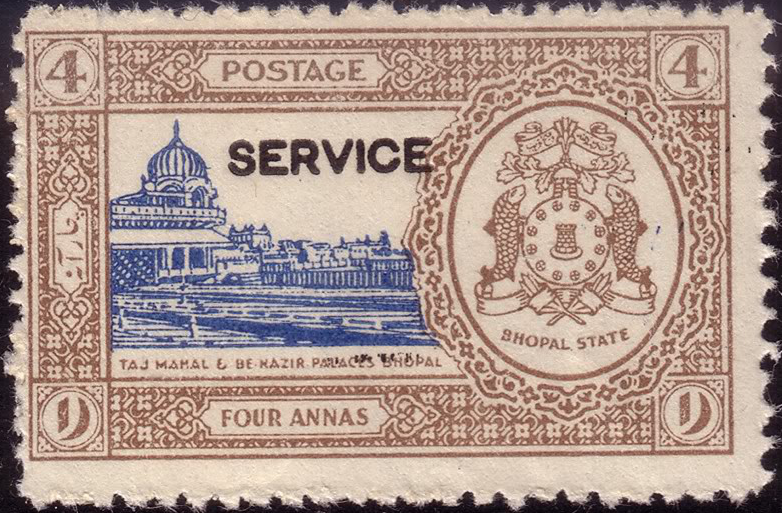
Taj Mahal and Benazir Palaces on a Bhopal State postal stamp

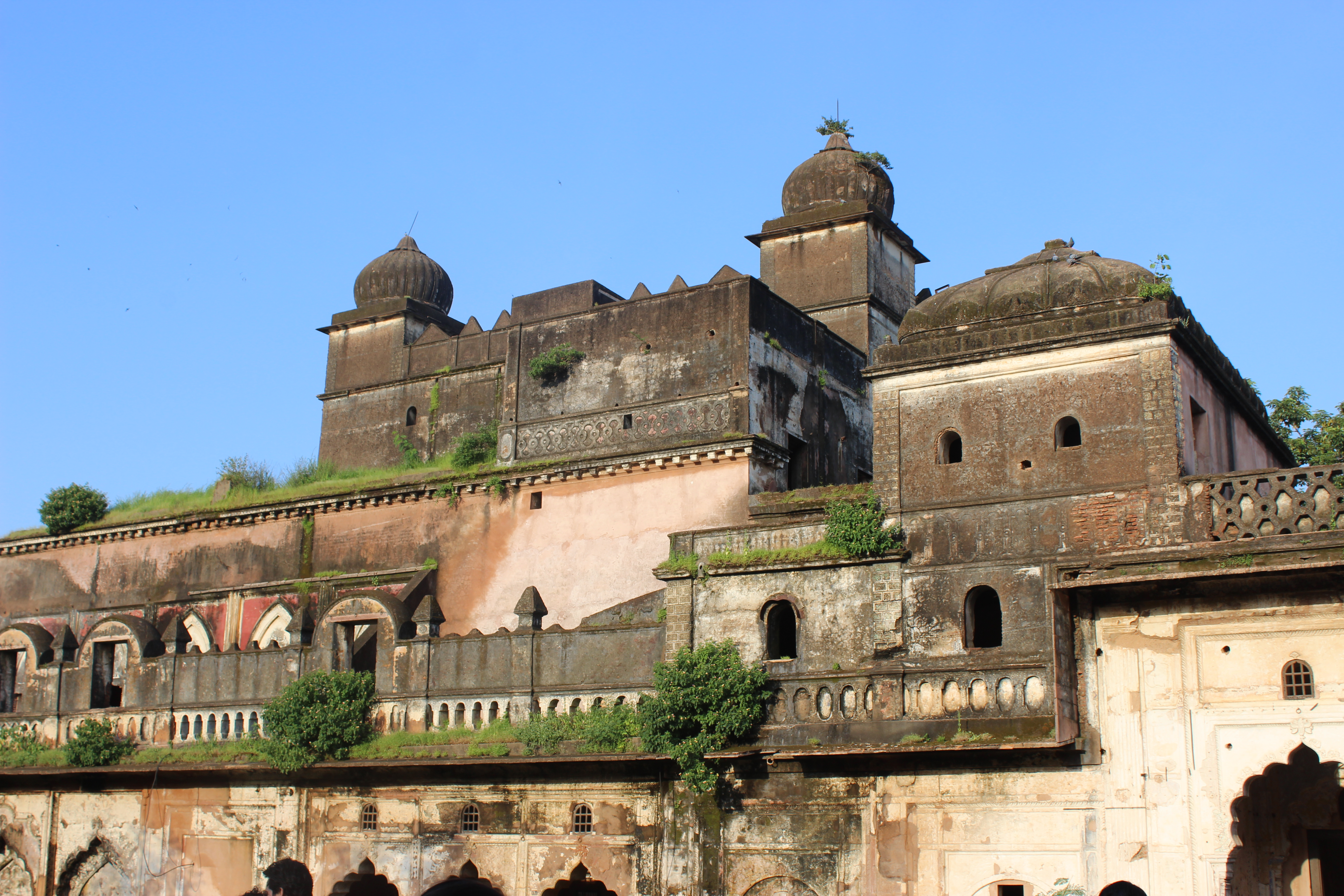
Taj Mahal main entrance back side

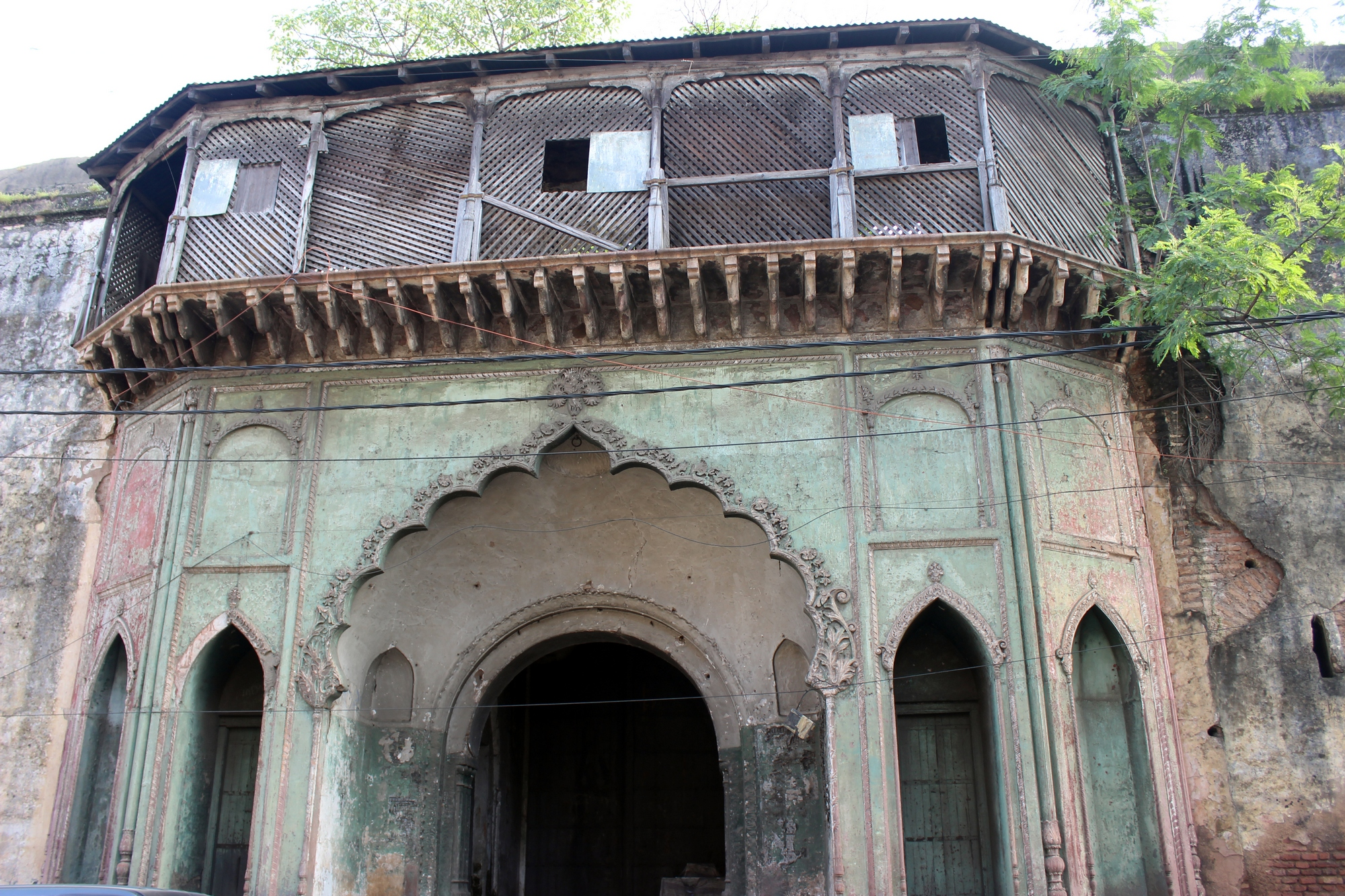
North facing entrance gate
