= Siddiq Hasan Khan =

Indian Muslim scholar and community leader (1832–1890)

Nawab Siddiq Hasan Khan
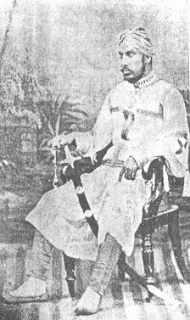
- Title: Nawab

Personal life
- Born: Siddiq Hasan Khan; 14 October 1832 Bareilly, United Provinces of British India, Mughal Empire (now India)
- Died: 26 May 1890 (aged 57) Bhopal, British Empire of India
- Spouse: Shah Jahan I of Bhopal (m. 1871)
- Citizenship: Indian
- Era: 19th century
- Other name: Muhammad Saddiq Hasan
- Occupation: Islamic scholar Muhaddith; Mufassir; Archivist; Historian; Bureaucrat

Religious life
- Religion: Islam
- Denomination: Sunni
- Jurisprudence: Salafi
- Creed: Athari
- Movement: Ahl-i Hadith

Nawab Consort of Bhopal
- In office 1871 – 26 May 1890
- Title: Allama, Sheikh

Personal life
- Spouse: Shah Jahan I of Bhopal (m. 1871)
- Notable work: See the list

Religious life
- Religion: Islam
- Founder of: Ahl-i Hadith

Muslim leader
- Teacher: Ahmad Hasan (elder brother): Muhammad Sadruddin Khan al-Dehlawi; Husayn ibn Muhsin al-Ansari; Abdul Haqq ibn Fadlullah al-Hindi; Muhammad Yaʿqub al-Dehlawi al-Makki Muhaddith 'Abd al-Haqq Banarasi
- Students: Yahya ibn Muhammad al-Hazmi (Mufti of Aden) Nu'man Khayruldin al-Alusi (Mufti of Baghdad)

Sayyid Muḥammad Ṣiddīq Ḥasan Khān al-Qannawjī (14 October 1832 – 26 May 1890) was an Islamic scholar and leader of British India's Muslim community in the 19th century, often considered to be the most important Muslim scholar of the Bhopal State. He is largely credited alongside Syed Nazeer Husain with founding the revivalist Ahl-i Hadith movement, which is a strain of Sunni Islam throughout the immediate region. Siddiq Hasan Khan was also a prominent scholarly authority of the Arab Salafiyya movement of the late 19th and early 20th centuries.

Khan's controversial nature has led to contrasting assessments of his personality, having been described by contrasting sources as a fundamentalist, and one of the first heroes of the Indian independence movement. As one of the central figures of the early Ahl-i Ḥadīth networks, Siddiq Hasan Khan was also a major South Asian exponent of the teachings of the classical theologian ibn Taymiyya (661–728 A.H /1263–1328 C.E). Apart from ibn Taymiyya, Siddiq Hasan Khan was also influenced by the scholarly traditions of al-Shawkani, Shah Waliullah Dehlawi and Sayyid Ahmed.

== Early life ==
=== Family background ===
Khan's family were said to be descendants of Ali, the fourth of Rashidun caliphs. Initially settled in Bukhara, they migrated to Multan and later to Kannauj (also sometimes spelled as Qannawj). Khan was born in Bareilly, which was the natal home of his mother, on 14 October 1832. After a few days, his mother brought him to his ancestral city Kannauj.

Khan grew up in a family which was impoverished despite its history of Islamic scholarship; his father converted from Shi'a Islam to Sunni Islam in the early 1800s. Siddiq Hasan's father Sayyid Awlad Hasan was a strong supporter of Sayyid Ahmad, pledging Bay'ah (oath of allegiance) at his hands and had accompanied him to Afghanistan in the northwest frontier Province to participate in his famous Jihad movement. Wilayat Ali Khan and Inayat Ali Khan, two major leaders of the Wahhabi Jihad movement had stayed briefly in Khan's house in Qannauj. Under the instructions and tutelage of Wilayat Ali, Khan studied the Hadith work Bulugh al-Maram and later wrote a well-known commentary on it.

=== Religious Studies ===
Thus, Khan was influenced by the religious ideals of Sayyid Ahmad and his Wahhabi jihad movement in his early life. Khan received much of his education in Farukhabad, Kanpur and Delhi under the care of friends of his father, who died when Khan was only five years old. While in Delhi, Siddiq Hasan studied Hadith sciences under the tutelage of 'Abd al Haqq Banarasi (d.1870) who was a major source of influence in shaping the teachings of Ahl-i Hadith. 'Abd al Haqq Banarasi was a member of Sayyid Ahmad Shahid's Hajj to Mecca in 1821 and decided to stay behind in Hejaz. Later Banarasi travelled to the Yemenite capital Sana'a, and studied under the theologian al-Shawkānī (d. 1834). After his studies under in Yemen, Banarasi would be the first scholar in India to introduce the works of Shawkani in India. When Khan adopted 'Abd al-Haqq as his teacher, the latter had become a well known Muhaddith noted for his stances against Taqlid.

After pursuing Islamic studies with two Yemeni clerics who had emigrated to Bhopal, Khan came under the influence of the works of prolific Yemeni Islamic scholar Muhammad al-Shawkani. The reformist influence on Khan's thinking only increased with his performance of Hajj (Muslim pilgrimage) to Mecca, during which he became familiar with the works of the 14th century Syrian polemicist Ibn Taymiyyah. Khan brought back a large amount of books with him upon returning to Bhopal and began writing commentaries. Khan relocated to Bhopal in 1854 initially selling perfume but later working as a schoolteacher, where his religious views gained him the ire of traditionalist locals. He was expelled to Tonk in 1857, but soon returned to Kannauj to protect his family during the Indian Rebellion of 1857.

== Nawab Consort of Bhopal ==
=== Rise to Power ===
Siddiq Hasan Khan took up a job as an archivist and state historian in 1859 under Shah Jahan, who at the time was notable as a woman in the Kingdom of Bhopal who was heir apparent to the throne. For the first time in his life, Khan was financially well-off and brought his sister and mother to live with him in Bhopal. Khan married for the first time in 1860, to the daughter of the prime minister who was eleven years his senior. Siddiq Hasan Khan eventually married Begum on suggestion of his father-in-law (father of his first wife). Upon Shah Jahan's coronation in 1871, Khan was promoted to the position of chief secretary, began spending longer periods of time alone with Shah Jahan and the two were eventually married; with his second marriage, Khan had become the male consort of the female monarch.

According to Lepel Griffin, the marriage was in part to quash the rumor mongering, and officials made it clear that Khan was merely the Sultan's husband and would not function in any executive role. The marriage was controversial due to Indian beliefs regarding the remarriage of widows; ironically, the stated justification for support of the marriage by British officials – themselves predominantly Christians – was that Islam encourages widows to remarry. Despite remaining the spouse of the actual monarch, Khan's wife began to observe purdah and corresponded with male diplomats with Khan as her representative. Shāh Jahān Bēgum's daughter Sulṭān Jahān Bēgum was one of her stepfather's fiercest opponents, often labelling him as a "Wahhabi"; for forcing her mother to be in purdah. Khan's mother-in-law held rather negative reviews of her daughter's new husband, and there was friction between the two families.

=== Implementation of Reforms ===
Once in power, Siddiq Hasan Khan began enforcing his reformist ideas through the authority of the state. Under his wife's reign, the doctrines of the Ahl-i Hadith began to be enforced as the state religion. Various royal ceremonies and folk rituals which Khan regarded as bid'at (religious innovations) were banned. Apart from this, a comprehensive religious educational programme was also implemented by the Bhopal State. Numerous madrasahs teaching Ahl-i Hadith doctrines were set up, hundreds of religious treatises of Khan were published and mass distributed across South Asia through the state-run printing press.

With the help of Yemeni Islamic scholars in Bhopal, Khan also attacked folk Islam as well as the practices of both Sufism and Shi'a Islam. As the de facto ruler of Bhopal, Khan banned celebrations for the Islamic prophet Muhammad's birthday (Mawlid) as heretical practices without basis in Islam, something which upset Sufis greatly. Additionally, his reformist ideas in regard to Islamic jurisprudence upset the predominant Hanafi school of Islamic law. Khan's humble beginnings and working-class background also caused him to become the object of scorn, condescension yet also jealousy on the part of Bhopal's gentry. Khan was still described as a prototypical Indo-Persian gentleman, multilingual, educated and with wide-reaching international ties.

Khan's socio-political efforts proved to be his undoing; just as quickly as he rose to become Bhopal's most influential Islamic leader, so did he lose this status. Siddiq Hasan's enemies in Bhopal State and other Muslim religious circles had often accused him of being a "Wahhabi", a label commonly employed by the colonial authorities to denote "anti-British" rebels, "fanatic", "puritan" etc.; with the intention to eradicate his influence in Bhopal. Initially, the British ignored accusations of his Muslim opponents that Khan was a proponent of "Wahhabism". "Wahhabi" label was detested within both the British and Ottoman Empires due to the political challenge posed by the Arabian reformer Ibn 'Abd al-Wahhab's Muwahhidun movement to the dominance of the two states in the Middle East. Later, the British authorities began to inspect Siddiq Hasan's books closely and discovered his treatises which elaborated his doctrines on jihad. Furthermore, when they detected that 17 Wahhabi scholars from Najd had come to study in Bhopal under Khan's tutelage, the British suspected him of being part of a pan-Islamic anti-British conspiracy; extending across India, Egypt, Istanbul, and Mahdist Sudan.

=== Conflicts with the Colonial Authorities ===
After reviewing Khan's treatises that incited to jihad and observing several students from Arabia attend lessons under Khan, the British authorities publicly accused Khan of puritanism and anti-colonial agitation in 1881. The British press at the time maligned Khan as a negative influence in the region, and pejoratively dubbed him as "the penniless adventurer." Despite being accused of sedition against the state, Governor-General of India Lord Dufferin found no evidence of seditious acts on Khan's part at all after official inquiries. Khan even went so far as to write criticisms of Muhammad ibn 'Abd al-Wahhab, who followed an entirely different school of Islamic law, to exonerate himself from the accusations of Wahhabism.

=== Deposal and House Arrest (1885–1890) ===
Wary of Khan's influential position in the Bhopal State, British Resident Sir Lepel Griffin deposed Khan in 1885; charging him with instigating Indian Muslims against the British administration. For his part, Siddiq Hasan Khan firmly denied any Wahhabi influence on the Indian reformists. Furthermore, Khan had directly criticised the Najdi Wahhabis for their religious fanaticism, which caused bloodshed among fellow Muslims. Despite this, the British dismissed all his titles and sentenced him to house-arrest until his death in 1890. He was forbidden to visit his wife Shāh Jahān Bēgum during the day, but was permitted to spend the night in her palace, the Tāj Maḥal. Both before and after his removal from the royal court by the British in 1885, Shah Jahan defended her husband to the very end as shown in the meeting minutes of a heated, vehement exchange between herself and Sir Griffin. On behalf of her husband, Shah Jahan denied that Khan held any executive power and merely advised her on some issues, arguing that the claims of her husband controlling her were based on jealousy on the part of her son-in-law and personal problems between Khan and Lepel.

== Death ==
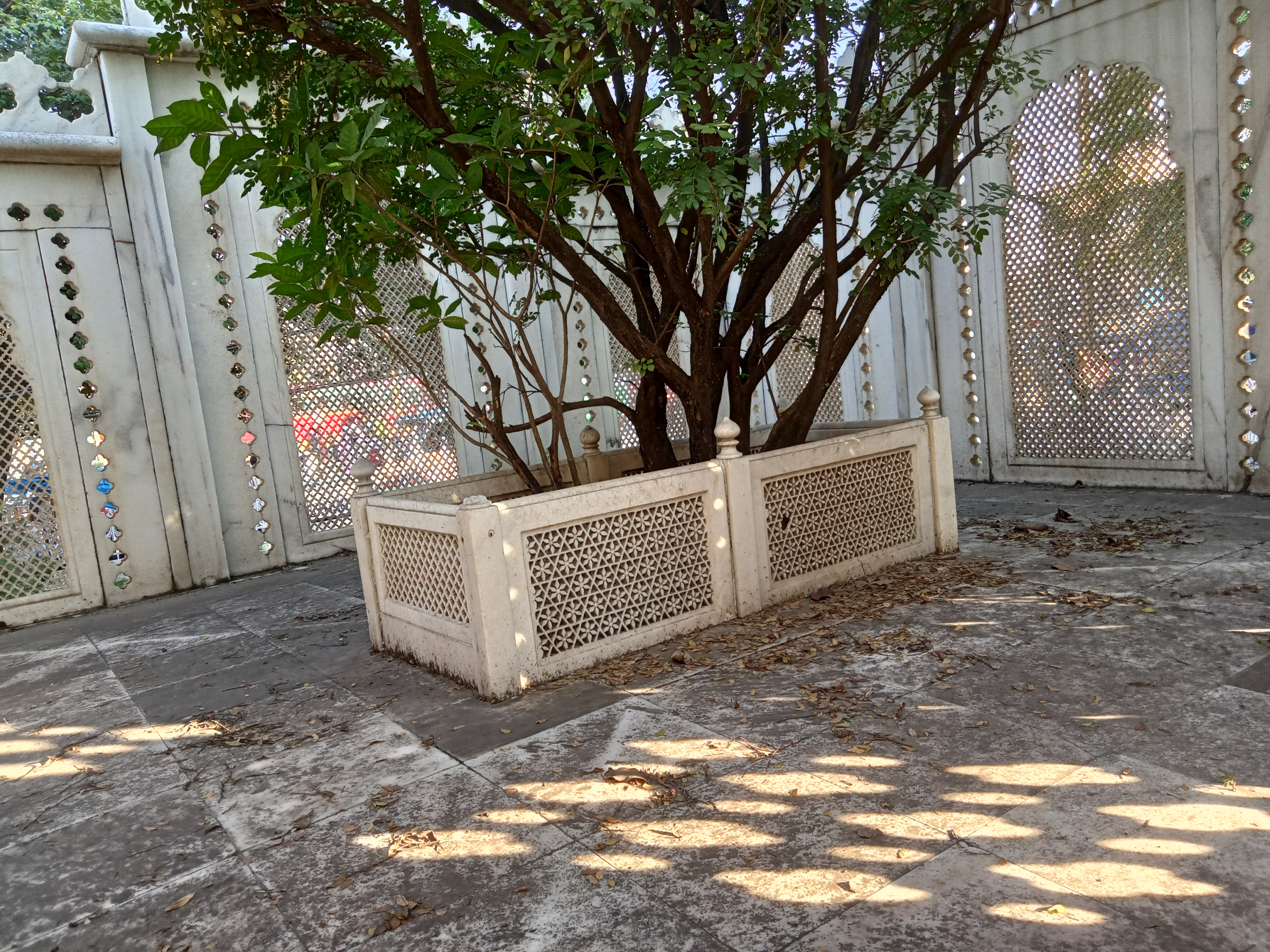
Khan's gravestone

After deposing Ṣiddīq Ḥasan, the colonial authorities banned him from maintaining contacts with his publishers in Cairo or Istanbul, and the publication of his works were proscribed. After the emergence of Salafiyya movement, his Arabic treatises would be published across the Arab world. In 1890, Khan fell extremely ill with hepatitis. Resident Francis Henvey, Griffin's replacement, dispatched a medical officer but refused to administer medicine for fear that, given the terminal nature of Khan's illness, Henvey would be accused of poisoning him. Khan died on 20 February 1890.

== Reception ==
According to University of Erfurt professor Jamal Malik, the British overthrow of Khan was due to a number of political concerns rather than wrongdoing on Khan's own part. The start of the Mahdist War in Sudan in 1881 (which Khan ironically openly opposed), diplomatic ties between Khan's wife and the Sharif of Mecca and Khan's letter exchanges with Ottoman Sultan Abdul Hamid II all caused the British authorities to fear a pan-Islamist uprising. To withdraw the accusations against Khan, however baseless they were, would have weakened the British Empire's position in the wider Muslim world. Eventually, British officials admitted that they had overreacted based on rumors and intrigues among Bhopal's political elite and that Khan had been falsely accused; regardless, the Indian nationalist movement still regarded him as a hero in the anti-colonialist struggle. Upon Khan's death, his widow Shah Jahan negotiated with British authorities to have all of his official titles restored posthumously; Shah Jahan saw this as vindication of her belief that her husband had been falsely slandered, and filled her new court with Khan's relatives and associates. Among other details, Siddiq Hasan Khan had accused the Wahhabis of engaging in inter-religious violence and bloodshed and still clinging to the same traditionalist views for which Khan also criticized the Indian Sufis and Shi'ites.

Khan lived during an era when repercussions of the defeat of the Mujahidin movement of Sayyid Ahmad at the Battle of Balakot (1831) were felt widespread across South Asia. Followers of Sayyid Ahmad were being threatened and punished for various practices, such as saying "Ameen" loudly in prayer rituals". As an Islamic scholar who was able to attain a position of high political authority, Khan began facing numerous rivals as well as threats from the British government who accused him of spreading Wahhabi doctrines, which were criminalised. Since Khan was unable to defend Muhammad Ibn 'Abd al-Wahhab and his doctrines, his main concern was to protect the Muwahhidin (Ahl-i Hadith) in India, who were accused of being Wahhabis. He argued that the beliefs of Ahl-i Hadith of India were based on Qur'an and Sunnah, and were not derived from Najdi scholars; attempting to distinguish them from the Ahl-i Hadith. Yet Khan had also rebutted various claims made against Wahhabism, by bringing up Ibn 'Abd al-Wahhab's responses as well as defenses made by various supporters of the movement. Giving a resume of the life and reform efforts of Muhammad ibn 'Abd al-Wahhab, Khan traced the political rise and subsequent defeat of the Muwahhidun movement in the Arabian Peninsula in 1818. Khan asserts that followers of Ibn 'Abd al-Wahhab and Sayyid Ahmad were labelled "Wahhabis" due to ulterior motives of imperial powers. Since the works of the Arabian reformer were not published by the followers of Sayyid Ahmad, labelling them as "Wahhabis" was a policy of religio-political abuse. Khan asserts that the apt term for Sayyid Ahmad's followers was Ahl al-Hadith (followers of the Hadith), since the term was as old as the early eras of Islam.

Additionally, Khan had based his religious views on the Pan-Islamist internationalism borne by the networks created by colonialists themselves. The Wahhabi movement, on the other hand, was geographically specific to the anti-colonial struggle and cultural environment of the Middle East. Khan elaborated that the Wahhabi movement had no relevance to the situation and experience of reform-minded Muslims in India:

Those who worship one God object to being called Wahhabis in the Ibn Abdul-Wahhab kind of way not only due to his belonging to a different nation and all of its politics, but because they consider God as the ruler and the protector of the whole world and this universalistic stance is blunted if they are said to be followers of a terrotorially rooted Abdul-Wahhab.

By denying any communications with the inhabitants of Najd and stressing that he did not publish the works of Ibn 'Abd al-Wahhab; Khan sought to publicly delink his Indian followers from the Wahhabi movement and thereby avert the potential repercussions from the British government. However, the British eventually took action against Siddiq Hasan Khan, accusing him of involvement in Pan-Islamist anti-British agitation. This was after the British authorities had discovered various treatises of Khan elucidating his stance on Jihad and detected several Najdi scholars under Khan's tutelage in Bhopal. Despite his own defense and the efforts of his wife to protect him, Khan was deposed by the British in 1885 and spent the remaining five years of his life living in privacy.

Outside politics Khan's efforts to preserve and revive Hadith studies, focusing on the statements and actions of Muhammad, were well received. Due to his large amount of edited and original published works, he has been dubbed "the Indian Al-Suyuti."

== Legacy ==
=== Views ===
==== Theology ====
Khan's theological views were very much a product of Shah Waliullah's reformist school in India. After Shah Waliullah, Siddiq Hasān Khan had emerged as the most prominent advocate of Ibn Taymiyya's legacy in South Asia by undertaking the publication of a number of treatises that either elucidated his doctrines or provided theological arguments defending his ideas. He also reconciled Ibn Taymiyya's thought with what he regarded as authentic Sufi spirituality. Coupled with the reformist ideas of Yemeni theologian Muhammad ibn 'Ali Al-Shawkani, Khan and his Ahl al-Hadith movement established similar iconoclastic ideas to the mainstream at the time.

As an Athari theologian who embraced their doctrines, Khan strongly condemned Taqlid (blind-following) and believed in the literal interpretation of God's Attributes as part of upholding Tawhid. Siddiq Hasan Khan played a major role in reviving and mainstreamising Ibn Taymiyya's theological polemics among 19th century Ahl-i Hadith circles; and denounced those who differed from the literalist understanding of Divine Attributes as "Jahmites" and "Mu'tazilites". Through the publication of his works as well as classical creedal manuscripts across South Asia and the Arab world, Khan considered the spread of Taymiyyan theology as one of the central aspects of his religious programme.

Like Ibn Taymiyya, Khan also condemned Kalām as a discipline "full of speculation" which was introduced by scholars of "Greek philosophy". However, Siddiq Hasan Khan downplayed Ibn Taymiyya's denunciation of Ash'ari school and did not follow him on this point. While the Ahl-i Hadith favoured the literalist, anti-speculative Atharite approaches, they also considered Ash'aris as part of Sunni Islam and did not seek to deteriorate relations with the Ash'arite scholarship in the Bhopal State. In his treatise Ḥujaj al-kirāma, Ṣiddīq Ḥasan asserts that the core differences between the Ashʿaris and Atharis were limited to three or four points, without naming those issues. According to Khan, these were merely "practical" divergences (khilāf-i taṭbīq) and "differences in terminology" (nizāʿ-yi lafẓī); which were of minor importance. At the same time, Khan attacked the foundational premises of both logic and Kalam through his treatises like Abjad al-ʿulūm; basing himself on the works of past scholars like Al-Shawkani, Al-San'ani and Ibn Taymiyya.

==== Reformist Vision ====
Siddiq Hasan Khan's writings had a striking tone of pervasive pessimism, a fear of the End of the World, which propelled him towards an emotional commitment to herald drastic reforms. He thought that the English rule over Muslims was a sign of the End Times and viewed rebellions and religious disorder across the Muslim world as evidence of a total decline. Proposing a solution to revert this decline, Siddiq Hasan Khan envisioned the revival of a unified Umma welded together by a singular interpretation of the scriptures. For Khan and his disciples, the horror of disorder drove them to establish a true and common standard on which all Muslims could unite. However, this forced exclusivity and vision of drastic reforms created dissension and sparked protest from the rest of the scholarly establishment.

The theological and intellectual attitudes of Khan and his Ahl-i Hadith students were based on their pursuit of doctrinal uniformity through textual literalism and refuting the ideas of all other Muslim sects. Asserting that Islamic unity can only be attained through literalist understanding of the Scriptures, Siddiq Hasan Khan writes:

"Those who are sincere servants of God and followers of the Tradition shun matters of dissension and disruption in the same way that worldly people shun matters of piety. . . . On the many new roads [i.e. the Law schools] that appeared approximately three hundred years after the hijrah or that day and night are constantly appearing, let no one walk. He who travels the straight path reaches the desired goal."

Not surprisingly given the fate of his ideological predecessors, much of Khan's polemics was based as a reaction against the prevailing religious climate; Mirza Ghulam Ahmad, the Deobandi and Barelvi movements and the Shi'ites from which Khan himself was descended were all targets of Khan's reformist criticism. Khan's religious views have been described as centering on a desire to return to the pristine values with which Islam originally came, and to rid the Muslim world of the ills of charlatans, frauds and Hindu influence on Muslim practice.

=== Works ===
After his marriage to the Sultan, Khan began publishing his own original works in Arabic, Persian and Urdu; the number of his works eventually topped 200, and many of them were distributed by the state press for free in Bhopal's schools. His polemical and theological works are generally underlain by the principles of self-judgment, reason and rationality.

Khan has been noted as one of the first scholars to research the topic of lexicography of the Arabic language, a field of study which the Arabs themselves had ignored until recently. Khan also made a comprehensive review of Arabic philology and lexicons produced up to his time.

Khan also compiled a Qurʾānic commentary titled Fatḥ al-bayān fī maqāṣid al-Qurʾān, a seminal work in the field of Tafsir which inspired numerous Islamic revivalist movements. It drew extensively from Yemeni theologian Shawkani's 1814 work on Qur'anic exegesis, Fatḥ al-qadīr. Being written in Arabic, Fatḥ al-bayān was also widely circulated across the Arab world.

==== Original works ====
- Al-Bulgha fi Usul al-Lugha. Istanbul, 1879. Arabic.
- Hell-fire: Its Torments and Denizens. Trns. Saleh Dalleh. International Islamic Publishing House, 2005. English. ISBN 9789960850542
- Tarjuman-i Wahhabiya. Bhopal, 1884. Urdu.
- Ash Shamama tul Anbarah min Mawlid al Khayr ul Barah (On Celebrating the Mawlid)
- Fatḥ al-bayān fī maqāṣid al-Qurʾān, 1874.

== See also ==
- Syed Nazeer Husain
- Salafism
