= Chaman Mahal =

18th-century palace in India

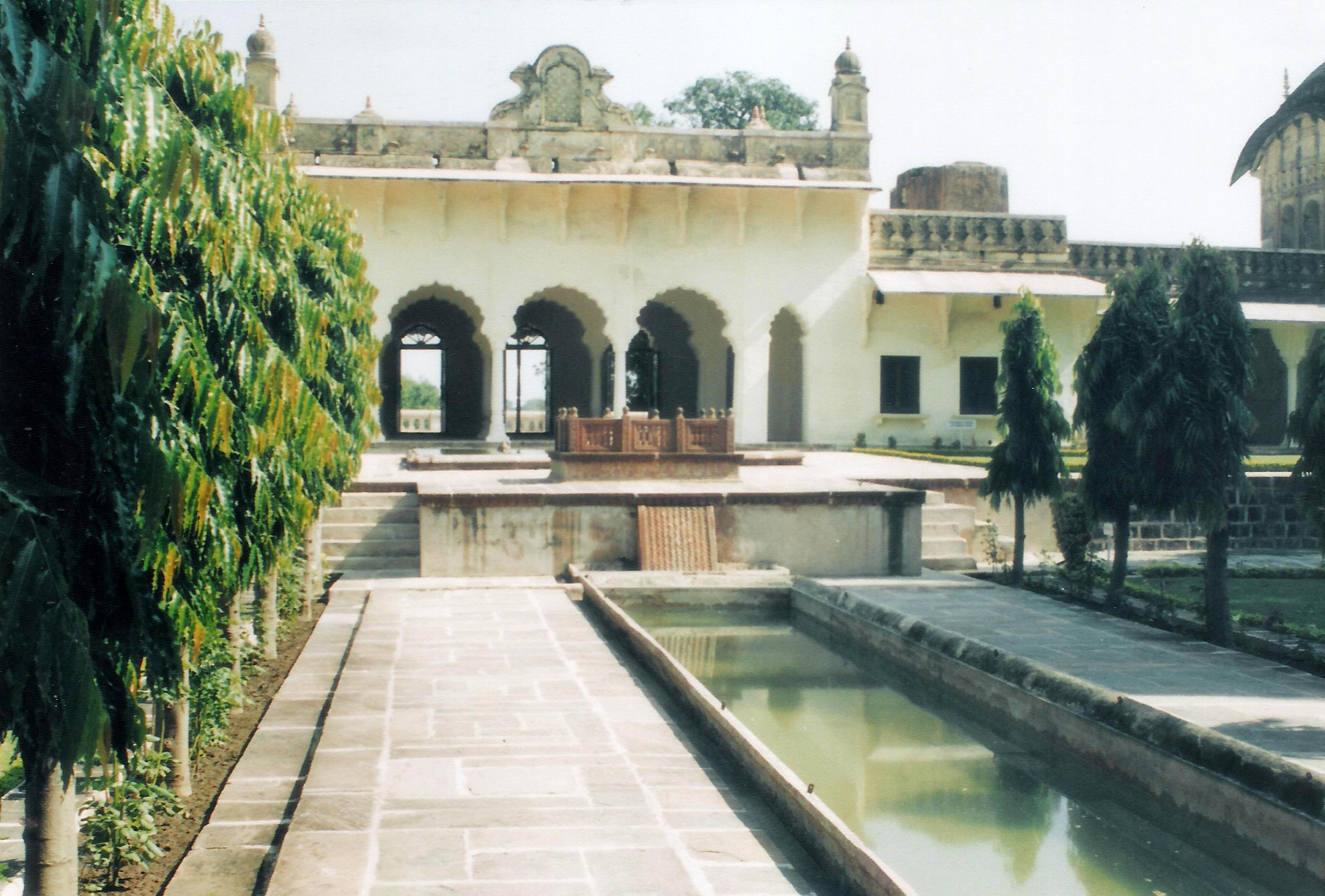
- Interactive map of Chaman Mahal
- 23.357681°N 77.417875°E
- Location: Islamnagar

History
- Built: 1715
- Built for: Dost Mohammad Khan

Site notes
- Architectural style: Mughal Malwal

Chaman Mahal is a palace in the Bhopal district of Madhya Pradesh, India. It was built by Afghan Commander Dost Mohammad Khan, who was the ruler of Islamnagar in 1715. It is located 11 km away from Bhopal, capital of Madhya Pradesh. 'Chaman' means garden and hence the palace is also known as Garden palace, having an attractive garden in the middle of palace with multiple fountains. The Chaman Mahal is made of sandstone in Mughal and Malwa style of architecture and has 12 gates at the entrance, with Bengali-influenced drooping eaves. It is a red sandstone structure built by Dost Mohammad Khan. It is also known as Islamnagr fort. It is surrounded by gardens and fountains, and is ornamented with floral motifs. It has charbagh style garden. The ruined palace has a Mughal water garden and a hamam (Turkish bathhouse).
