= Chaman Laleh =

Chaman Laleh چمن لاله
- Village
- Location within Iran
- Coordinates: 31°29′56″N 49°28′08″E
- Country: Iran
- Province: Khuzestan
- County: Haftgel
- Bakhsh: Raghiveh
- Rural District: Gazin

Population (2006)
  - Total: 326
- Time zone: UTC+3:30 (IRST)
  - Summer (DST): UTC+4:30 (IRDT)

Chaman Laleh (Persian: چمن لاله, also Romanized as Chaman Lāleh; also known as Chaman) is a village in Gazin Rural District, Raghiveh District, Haftgel County, Khuzestan Province, Iran. At the 2006 census, its population was 326, in 84 families.
