= Islamnagar, Bhopal =

Islamnagar
- Village
- Jagdishpur
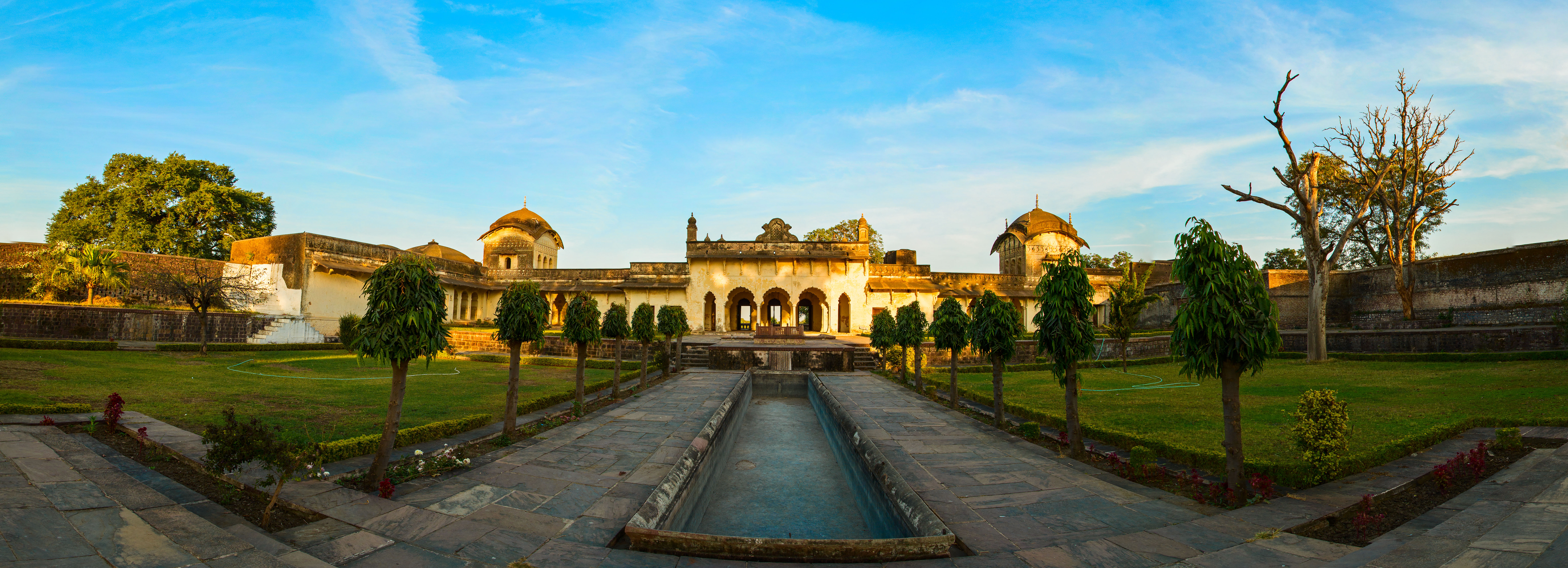
- Chaman Mahal

- Location within Madhya Pradesh Location within India
- Coordinates: 23.3547403°N 77.4171237°E
- Country: India
- State: Madhya Pradesh
- District: Bhopal
- Tehsil: Huzur
- Block: Phanda
- Elevation: 485 m (1,591 ft)

Population (2011)
  - Total: 3,638
- Time zone: UTC+5:30 (IST)
- 2011 census code: 482390

Islamnagar (officially known as Jagdishpur since February 2023) is a panchayat village in the Bhopal district of Madhya Pradesh, India. It is located in the Huzur tehsil and the Phanda block.

Formerly a fortified city, Islamnagar was the capital of the Bhopal princely state for a brief period. The ruins of the palaces built by Bhopal's founder Dost Mohammad Khan still exist at the site.

== History ==
Originally known as Jagadishpur, the place was founded by the local Rajput chieftains. In the early 18th century, the place was captured and renamed to Islamnagar ("city of Islam") by Dost Mohammad Khan, the founder of the Bhopal princely state. Islamnagar was the original capital of the Dost Mohammad Khan's state.

In 1723, Dost Mohammad Khan had to surrender the Islamnagar fort to Nizam-ul-Mulk after a brief siege. Khan was reduced to the position of a kiledar (fort commander) under the Nizam after a peace treaty. In year 1727 he shifted his capital to Bhopal. The Scindias controlled the Islamnagar fort from 1806 to 1817, when it was restored to Bhopal following a treaty.

Several members of the royal family of Bhopal, including Shah Jahan Begum, were born in Islamnagar.

In February 2023, the Government of Madhya Pradesh officially renamed the village as Jagdishpur.

== Geography ==
Islam Nagar lies on the Bhopal-Berasia road. Most of the modern development in this area are towards Lambakheda.

== Monuments ==
Chaman Mahal

Chaman Mahal ("Garden Palace") is a red sandstone structure built by Dost Mohammad Khan. It is also known as Islamnagr fort. It is surrounded by gardens and fountains, and is ornamented with floral motifs. It has charbagh style garden. The architecture is a synthesis of the Malwa-Mughal architecture, with Bengali-influenced drooping eaves. The ruined palace has a Mughal water garden and a hammam (Turkish bathhouse).

Rani Mahal

Rani Mahal ("Queen Palace") is a double-storey zenana complex (female residence). It has a colonnaded Diwan-e-Aam. It was residence for queens of Dost Mohammad Khan.

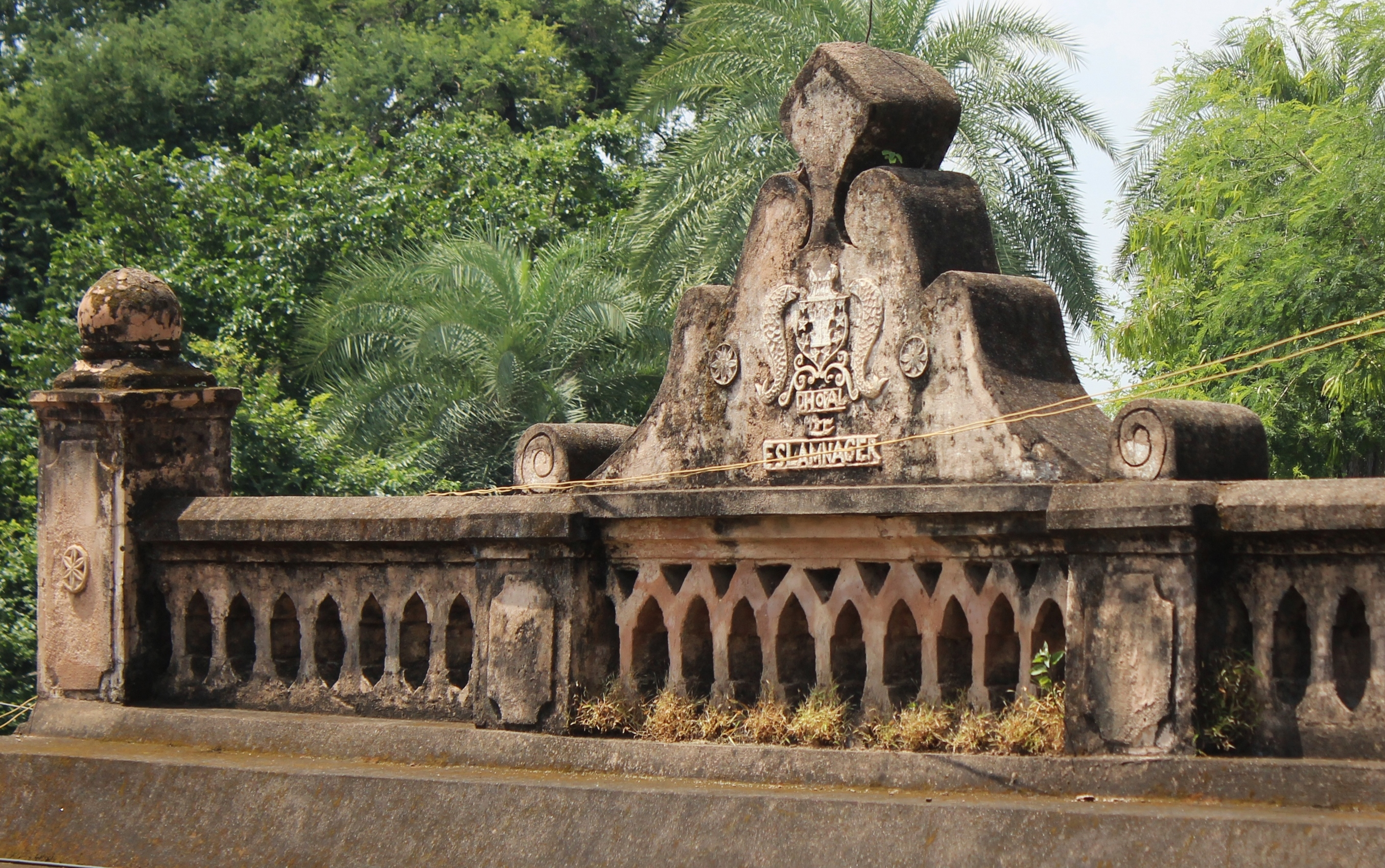
Islam Nagar entrance gate

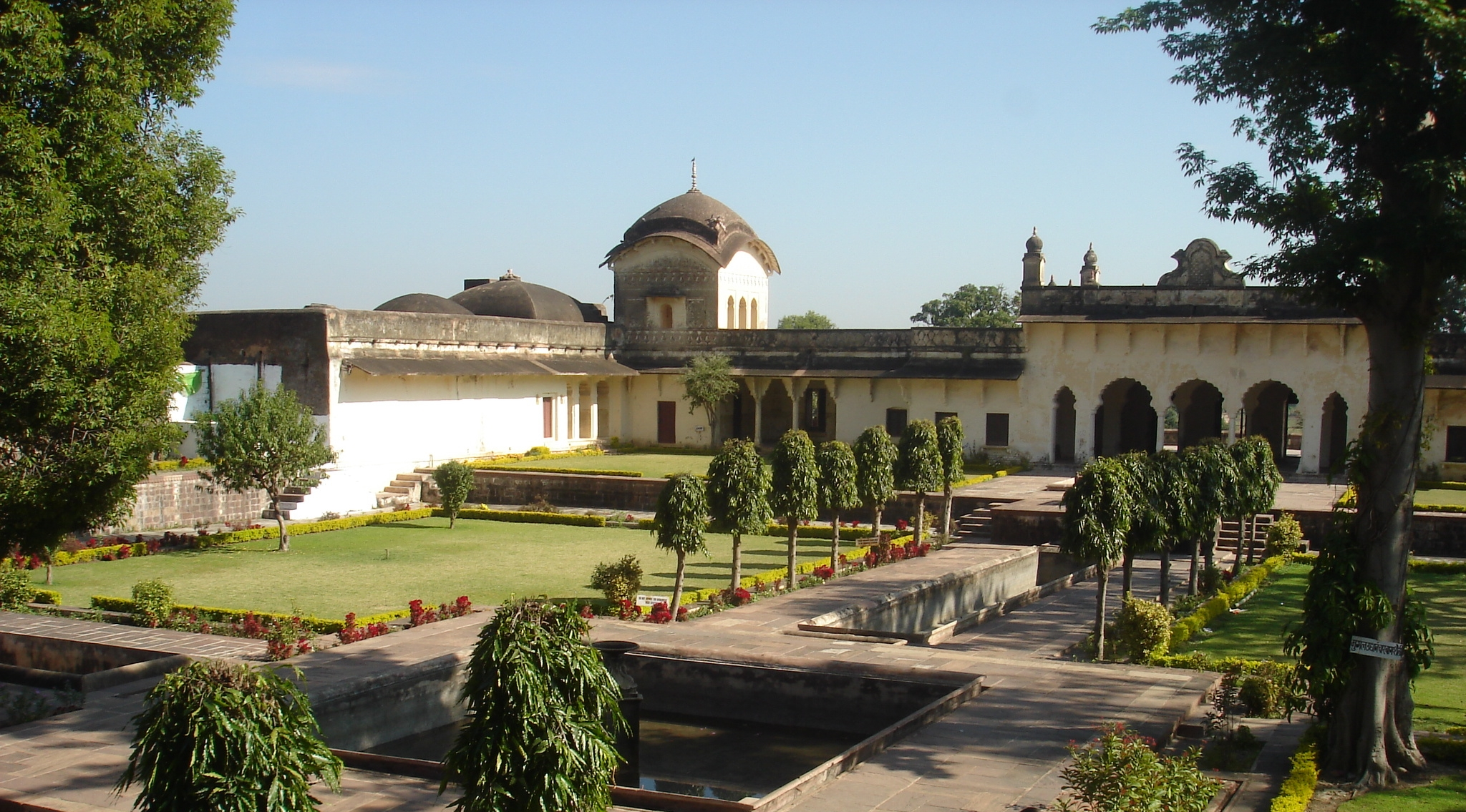
Chaman Mahal with garden

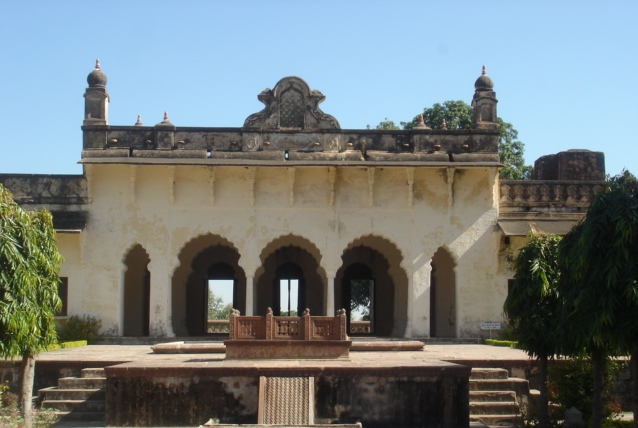
A part of the Rani Mahal

== Demographics ==
According to the 2011 census of India, Islamnagar has 724 households. The effective literacy rate (i.e. the literacy rate of population excluding children aged 6 and below) is 77.52%.
