= Faiz Mohammad Khan =

Nawab of Bhopal from 1742 to 1777

Faiz Muhammad Khan

Nawab of Bhopal
- Reign: 1742 – 12 December 1777
- Predecessor: Yar Mohammad Khan (as a reagent)
- Successor: Hayat Mohammad Khan
- Full name: Faiz Muhammad Khan Bahadur
- Born: 1731; Islamnagar, Bhopal
- Died: 1777 (aged 45–46); Fatehgarh, Bhopal
- Spouse: Saleha Begum Sahiba
- Father: Yar Mohammad Khan
- Military career
- Allegiance: Mughal Empire
- Branch: Nawab of Bhopal
- Rank: Subadar
- Conflicts: Mughal-Maratha Wars

Faiz Muhammad Khan Bahadur, (r.1742–1777) the third Nawab of Bhopal, was the son of Yar Muhammad Khan, the second Nawab of Bhopal (as a reagent), and the stepson of Mamola Bai a very influential Hindu wife of Yar Muhammad and a direct descendant of Dost Mohammad Khan.

== See also ==
- Muhammad Shah
- Alamgir II
