= Buraki, Marvdasht =

Buraki بوركي
- Village
- Location within Iran
- Coordinates: 30°03′18″N 52°40′07″E
- Country: Iran
- Province: Fars
- County: Marvdasht
- Bakhsh: Dorudzan
- Rural District: Ramjerd-e Do

Population (2006)
  - Total: 907
- Time zone: UTC+3:30 (IRST)
  - Summer (DST): UTC+4:30 (IRDT)

Buraki (Persian: بوركي, also Romanized as Būrakī and Bowrakī; also known as Chaman-e Būrakī and Kumābūraki) is a village in Ramjerd-e Do Rural District, Dorudzan District, Marvdasht County, Fars province, Iran. At the 2006 census, its population was 907, in 213 families.
