= Chaman (name) =

Chaman may refer to the following notable people:

Given name

- Chaman Lal (born 1947), Hindi translator
- Chaman Nahal (1927–2013), Indian born writer of English literature
- Chaman Puri (1914–1998), Indian actor

Surname

- Clive Chaman (born 1949), Trinidad-born musician
- Lauro Chaman (born 1987), Brazilian para cyclist

Other

- Chaman Lal Chaman (1934–2019), London-based noted Panjabi poet, lyricist and radio broadcaster
