= Mamola Bai =

Mamola Bai (1715–1795) was the Rajput wife of Yar Mohammad Khan the Nawab of Bhopal and step-mother of Faiz Mohammad Khan. She effectively ruled the Bhopal State for nearly 50 years, in name of her two stepsons Faiz and Hayat.

== See also ==
- Nawab of Bhopal
