= Chaman-e Morvarid =

Village in Darab, Iran

Chaman-e Morvarid چمن مرواريد
- Village
- Location within Iran
- Coordinates: 28°49′13″N 54°43′00″E
- Country: Iran
- Province: Fars
- County: Darab
- Bakhsh: Central
- Rural District: Balesh

Population (2013)
  - Total: 4,320
- Time zone: UTC+3:30 (IRST)
  - Summer (DST): UTC+4:30 (IRDT)

Chaman-e Morvarid (Persian: چمن مرواريد, also Romanized as Chaman-e Morvārīd) is a village in Balesh Rural District, in the Central District of Darab County, Fars province, Iran. At the 2013 census, its population was 4,320, in 523 families.
