= Shah Jahan Begum of Bhopal =

Begum of Bhopal (1838–1901)

Sultan Shah Jahan
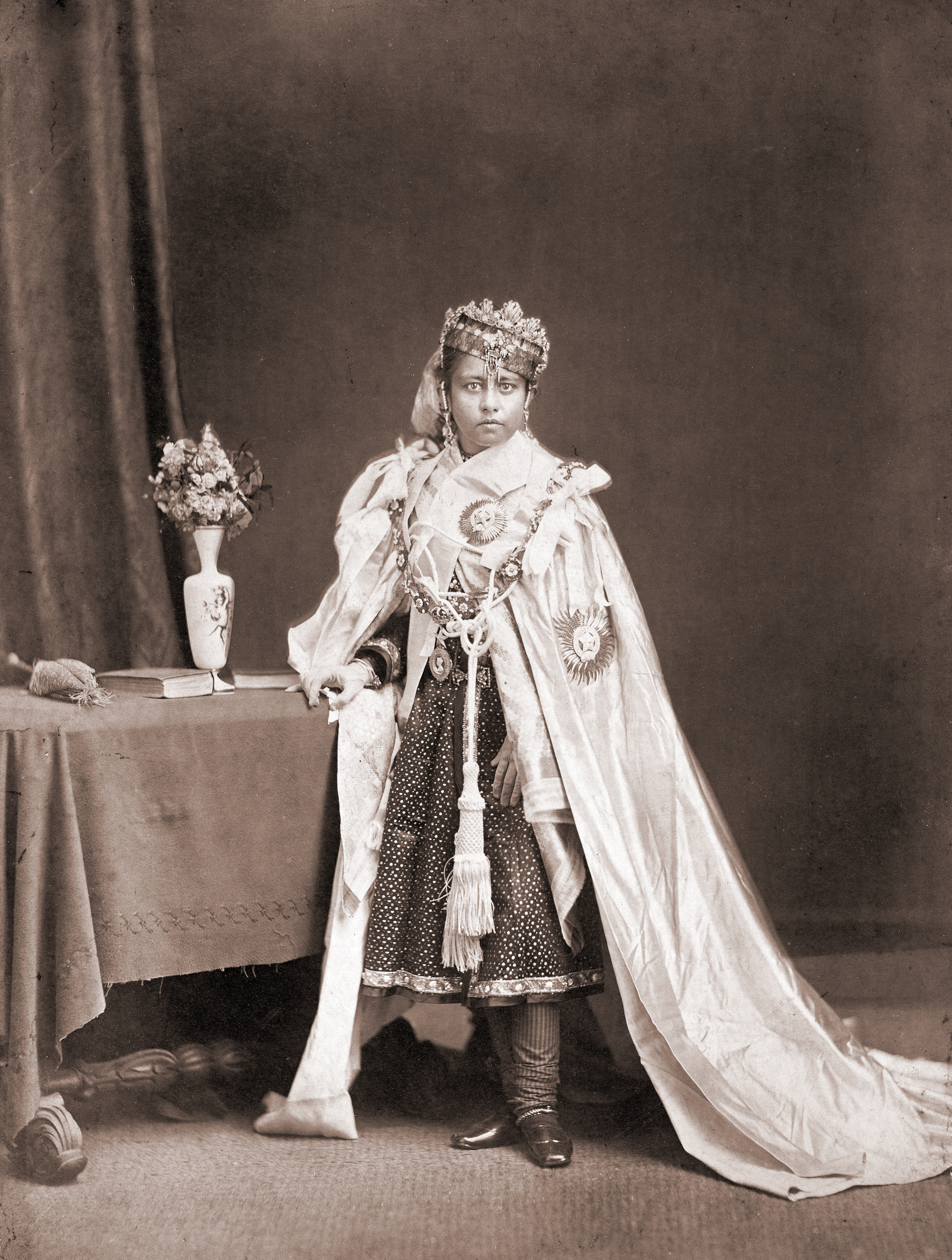
- Shah Jahan Begum in 1872

Begum of Bhopal
- First reign: 1844–1860
- Predecessor: Jahangir Mohammed Khan
- Successor: Sikandar Begum I
- Regent: Sikandar Begum (1844–1860)
- Second reign: 30 October 1868 – 16 June 1901
- Predecessor: Sikandar Begum I
- Successor: Sultan Jahan I
- Born: 29 July 1838; Islamnagar, Bhopal State, now Madhya Pradesh, India)
- Died: 16 June 1901 (aged 62); Bhopal State, now India
- Spouse: Baqi Muhammad Khan; Siddiq Hasan Khan
- Issue: Sultan Jahan I, Nawab Begum of Bhopal
- Urdu: سلطان شاہ جہاں بیگم
- House: Bhopal
- Father: Jahangir Mohammed Khan
- Mother: Sikandar Begum I, Nawab Begum of Bhopal
- Religion: Sunni Muslim
- Military career
- Allegiance: Bhopal State
- Service years: 1844–1860; 1868–1901

Shahjahan Begum GCSI CI (29 July 1838 – 16 June 1901) was the Nawab Begum of Bhopal (the ruler of the Islamic principality of Bhopal in central India) for two periods: 1844–60 (her mother acting as regent), and secondly during 1868–1901.

== Biography ==
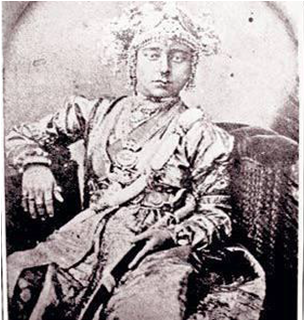
An 1878 picture of Sultan Shah Jahan Begum (or possibly, her daughter). The photo was misidentified as that of Rani Laxmibai in the 1909 book The Indian War of Independence.

Born in Islamnagar, near Bhopal, Shahjahan was the only surviving child of Sikandar Begum of Bhopal, sometime Nawab of Bhopal by correct title, and her husband Jahangir Mohammed Khan. She was recognised as ruler of Bhopal in 1844 at the age of six; her mother wielded power as regent during her minority. However, in 1860, her mother Sikandar Begum was recognised by the British as ruler of Bhopal in her own right, and Shahjahan was set aside. Shahjahan succeeded her mother as Begum of Bhopal upon the death of the latter in 1868.

Having been groomed for leadership of the state, Shahjahan improved the tax revenue system and increased state income, raised the salaries of her soldiers, modernised the military's arms, built a dam and an artificial lake, improved the efficiency of the police force and undertook the first census after the state suffered two plagues (the population had dropped to 744,000). To balance her budget deficit, she commissioned the cultivation of opium.

She was instrumental in initiating the construction of one of the largest mosques in India, the Taj-ul-Masajid, at Bhopal. The construction however remained incomplete at her death and was later abandoned; work was resumed only in 1971. She also built the Taj Mahal palace at Bhopal. While Shahjahan had desired to perform the Muslim pilgrimage to Mecca, frail health and her phobia of shipwrecks prevented her from ever doing so.

Shahjahan Begum made sizeable donations towards the building of a mosque at Woking, Surrey in the UK. She also contributed generously towards the founding of the Muhammadan Anglo-Oriental College at Aligarh, which developed into the Aligarh Muslim University. She also subsidised the cost of a railway to be constructed between Hoshangabad and Bhopal.

In 1855, Shahjahan Begum married Baqi Muhammad Khan, a nobleman of middle rank of Bhopal, as his third wife. He died in 1867. Four years later, Shahjahan married Siddiq Hasan Khan of Kannauj in the then United Provinces. The second marriage was childless. In addition to the deaths of two husbands, Shahjahan also experienced the deaths of two granddaughters.

Shahjahan Begum's final years were spent in leadership of a reasonably well-run state. In 1901, she was afflicted with cancer of the mouth; shortly thereafter, a message was published for the people of Bhopal asking forgiveness if Shahjahan had wronged any of her subjects, causing public grief over the illness of a popular ruler. Shahjahan was visited for one last time by her daughter Sultan Jehan, with whom Shahjahan had not spoken for thirteen years as Shahjahan had blamed her daughter for the death of her first granddaughter; even at this final meeting, Shahjahan refused to forgive her daughter. Shahjahan died shortly thereafter on 6 June 1901, and Sultan Jehan assumed the throne.

=== Postal services ===
During her reign the first postage stamps of the Bhopal state were issued. In 1876 and 1878, there were issues of half and quarter anna stamps. Those of 1876 have text "HH Nawab Shahjahan Begam" in an octagonal frame; the 1878 stamps the same text in a round frame and the Urdu form of the Begum's title. The last stamps bearing her name were issued in 1902 with inscription: "H.H. Nawab Sultan Jahan Begam". (The state postal service of Bhopal issued its own postage stamps until 1949; from the second issue of stamps in 1908 official stamps were issued until 1945 and these had the inscriptions "Bhopal State" or "Bhopal Govt." In 1949 two surcharged stamps were issued, the last of Bhopal's own stamps.)

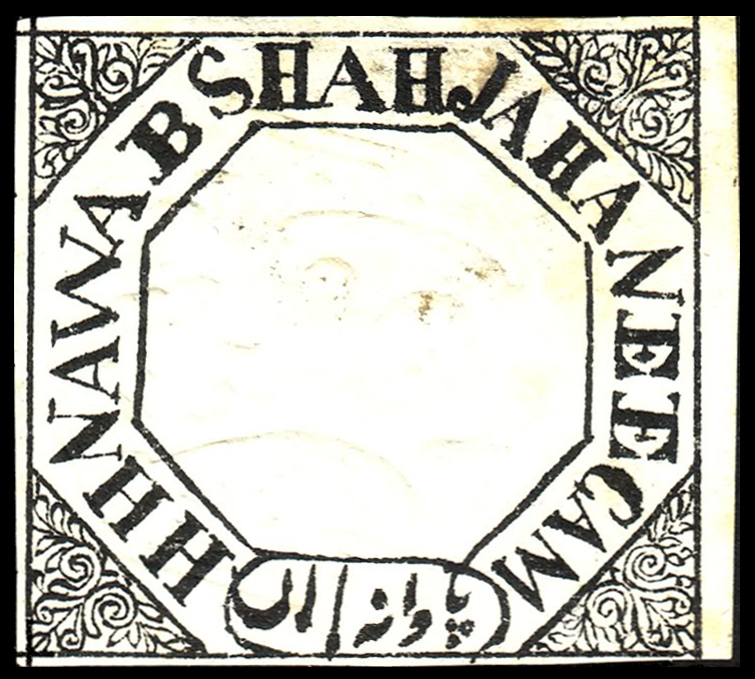
1876 stamp issued during the Begum's reign

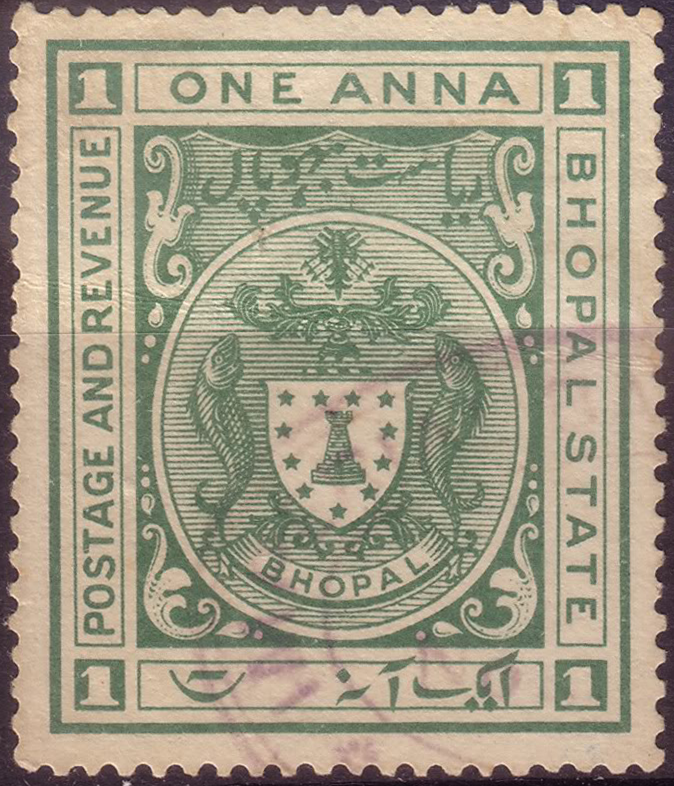
1908 one anna stamp of Bhopal State

== Publications (selected) ==
- The Taj-ul Ikbal Tarikh Bhopal, Or, The History of Bhopal, by Shah Jahan Begum, translated from Urdu by H. C. Barstow. Calcutta: Thacker, Spink, 1876.

== Sources ==
- The Begums of Bhopal: A Dynasty of Women Rulers in Raj India, by Shahraryar M. Khan. Published by I. B.Tauris, 2000. ISBN 1-86064-528-3. Excerpts
