= Shegaftik-e Olya =

Shegaftik-e Olya شگفتيك عليا
- Village
- Location within Iran
- Coordinates: 37°45′09″N 44°45′46″E
- Country: Iran
- Province: West Azerbaijan
- County: Urmia
- Bakhsh: Sumay-ye Beradust
- Rural District: Beradust

Population (2006)
  - Total: 230
- Time zone: UTC+3:30 (IRST)
  - Summer (DST): UTC+4:30 (IRDT)

Shegaftik-e Olya (Persian: شگفتيك عليا, also Romanized as Shegaftīk-e ‘Olyā; also known as Shegaftīk and Shekaftīk-e ‘Olyā) is a village in Beradust Rural District, Sumay-ye Beradust District, Urmia County, West Azerbaijan Province, Iran. At the 2006 census, its population was 230, in 46 families.
