= Chaman-e Golin =

Chaman-e Golin چمن گلين
- Village
- Location within Iran
- Coordinates: 34°15′25″N 45°57′56″E
- Country: Iran
- Province: Kermanshah
- County: Gilan-e Gharb
- Bakhsh: Central
- Rural District: Direh

Population (2006)
  - Total: 149
- Time zone: UTC+3:30 (IRST)
  - Summer (DST): UTC+4:30 (IRDT)

Chaman-e Golin (Persian: چمن گلين, also Romanized as Chaman-e Golīn; also known as Chaman) is a village in Direh Rural District, in the Central District of Gilan-e Gharb County, Kermanshah Province, Iran. At the 2006 census, its population was 149, in 36 families.
