= Chaman-e Bahram =

Chaman-e Bahram چمن بهرام
- Village
- Location within Iran
- Coordinates: 29°20′53″N 51°49′42″E
- Country: Iran
- Province: Fars
- County: Kazerun
- Bakhsh: Jereh and Baladeh
- Rural District: Dadin

Population (2006)
  - Total: 98
- Time zone: UTC+3:30 (IRST)
  - Summer (DST): UTC+4:30 (IRDT)

Chaman-e Bahram (Persian: چمن بهرام, also Romanized as Chaman-e Bahrām; also known as Cham-e Bahrāmi) is a village in Dadin Rural District, Jereh and Baladeh District, Kazerun County, Fars province, Iran. At the 2006 census, its population was 98, in 18 families.
