= Chaman Zar-e Olya =

Chaman Zar-e Olya چمنزار عليا
- Village
- Location within Iran
- Coordinates: 34°47′09″N 46°19′26″E
- Country: Iran
- Province: Kermanshah
- County: Javanrud
- Bakhsh: Central
- Rural District: Bazan

Population (2006)
  - Total: 170
- Time zone: UTC+3:30 (IRST)
  - Summer (DST): UTC+4:30 (IRDT)

Chaman Zar-e Olya (Persian: چمنزار عليا, Sorani Kurdish: چێمەنزاری ژوورو, also Romanized as Chaman Zār-e 'Olyā; also known as Cheshmeh Nezār, Cheshmeh Nezār-e 'Olyā, and Cheshmeh-ye Naz̧ar Bālā) is a village in Bazan Rural District, in the Central District of Javanrud County, Kermanshah Province, Iran. At the 2006 census, its population was 170, in 39 families.
