= Chaman Zar-e Sofla =

Chaman Zar-e Sofla چمنزارسفلي
- Village
- Location within Iran
- Coordinates: 34°47′25″N 46°19′27″E
- Country: Iran
- Province: Kermanshah
- County: Javanrud
- Bakhsh: Central
- Rural District: Bazan

Population (2006)
  - Total: 233
- Time zone: UTC+3:30 (IRST)
  - Summer (DST): UTC+4:30 (IRDT)

Chaman Zar-e Sofla (Persian: چمنزارسفلي, Sorani Kurdish: چەمەنزاری خوار, also Romanized as Chaman Zār-e Soflá; also known as Cheshmeh Nezār-e Soflá and Sorkheh Tūt) is a village in Bazan Rural District, in the Central District of Javanrud County, Kermanshah Province, Iran. At the 2006 census, its population was 233, in 55 families.
