= Shegaftik-e Sofla =

Shegaftik-e Sofla شگفتيك سفلي
- Village
- Location within Iran
- Coordinates: 37°45′13″N 44°46′43″E
- Country: Iran
- Province: West Azerbaijan
- County: Urmia
- Bakhsh: Sumay-ye Beradust
- Rural District: Beradust

Population (2006)
  - Total: 231
- Time zone: UTC+3:30 (IRST)
  - Summer (DST): UTC+4:30 (IRDT)

Shegaftik-e Sofla (Persian: شگفتيك سفلي, also Romanized as Shegaftīk-e Soflá; also known as Ḩājjī Maḩmūd, Chamān, and Shekaftīk-e Soflá) is a village in Beradust Rural District, Sumay-ye Beradust District, Urmia County, West Azerbaijan Province, Iran. At the 2006 census, its population was 231, in 40 families.
