= Order of succession =

Sequence of people entitled to hold a high office if it is vacated

An order, line or right of succession is the line of individuals necessitated to hold a high office when it becomes vacated, such as a head of state or an honour such as a title of nobility. This sequence may be regulated through descent or by statute.

Hereditary government form differs from elected government. An established order of succession is the normal way of passing on hereditary positions, and also provides immediate continuity after an unexpected vacancy in cases where office-holders are chosen by election: the office does not have to remain vacant until a successor is elected. In some cases the successor takes up the full role of the previous office-holder, as in the case of the presidency of many countries; in other non-hereditary cases there is not a full succession, but a caretaker chosen by succession criteria assumes some or all of the responsibilities, but not the formal office, of the position. For example, when the position of President of India becomes vacant, the Vice President of India temporarily carries out the functions of the presidency until a successor is elected; in contrast, when the position of President of the Philippines is vacant, the Vice President of the Philippines outright assumes the presidency itself for the rest of the term.

Organizations without hereditary or statutory order of succession require succession planning if power struggles prompted by power vacuums are to be avoided.

Research shows that authoritarian regimes that relied on primogeniture for succession were more stable than forms of authoritarian rule with alternative succession arrangements. Scholars have linked primogeniture to a decline in regicide, as clear rules of succession reduce the number of people who could (absent a coup d'état) replace a ruler, thus making it less desirable to cause the death of the monarch.

== Overview ==
It is often the case that the inheritance of a hereditary title, office or the like, is indivisible: when the previous holder ceases to hold the title, it is inherited by a single individual. Many titles and offices are not hereditary (such as democratic state offices) and they are subject to different rules of succession.

A hereditary line of succession may be limited to heirs of the body, or may also pass to collateral lines, if there are no heirs of the body, depending on the succession rules. These concepts are in use in English inheritance law.

The rules may stipulate that eligible heirs are heirs male or heirs general – see further primogeniture (agnatic, cognatic, and also equal).

Certain types of property pass to a descendant or relative of the original holder, recipient or grantee according to a fixed order of kinship. Upon the death of the grantee, a designated inheritance such as a peerage, or a monarchy, passes automatically to that living, legitimate, non-adoptive relative of the grantee who is most senior in descent (i.e. highest in the line of succession, regardless of age); and thereafter continues to pass to subsequent successors of the grantee, according to the same rules, upon the death of each subsequent heir.

Each person who inherits according to these rules is considered an heir at law of the grantee and the inheritance may not pass to someone who is not a natural, lawful descendant or relative of the grantee.

Collateral relatives, who share some or all of the grantee's ancestry, but do not directly descend from the grantee, may inherit if there is no limitation to "heirs of the body".

There are other kinds of inheritance rules if the heritage can be divided: heirs portioners and partible inheritance.

== Monarchies and nobility ==
In hereditary monarchies the order of succession determines who becomes the new monarch when the incumbent sovereign dies or otherwise vacates the throne. Such orders of succession, derived from rules established by law or tradition, usually specify an order of seniority, which is applied to indicate which relative of the previous monarch, or other person, has the strongest claim to assume the throne when the vacancy occurs.

Often, the line of succession is restricted to persons of the blood royal (but see morganatic marriage), that is, to those legally recognized as born into or descended from the reigning dynasty or a previous sovereign. The persons in line to succeed to the throne are called "dynasts". Constitutions, statutes, house laws, and norms may regulate the sequence and eligibility of potential successors to the throne.

Historically, the order of succession was sometimes superseded or reinforced by the coronation of a selected heir as co-monarch during the life of the reigning monarch. Examples are Henry the Young King and the heirs of elective monarchies, such as the use of the title King of the Romans for the Habsburg emperors. In the partially elective system of tanistry, the heir or tanist was elected from the qualified males of the royal family. Different monarchies use different rules to determine the line of succession.

Hereditary monarchies have used a variety of methods and algorithms to derive the order of succession among possible candidates related by blood or marriage. An advantage of employing such rules is that dynasts may, from early youth, receive grooming, education, protection, resources and retainers suitable for the future dignity and responsibilities associated with the crown of a particular nation or people. Such systems may also enhance political stability by establishing clear, public expectations about the sequence of rulers, potentially reducing competition and channeling cadets into other roles or endeavors.

Some hereditary monarchies have had unique selection processes, particularly upon the accession of a new dynasty. Imperial France established male primogeniture within the descent of Napoleon I, but failing male issue the constitution allowed the emperors to choose who among their brothers or nephews would follow them upon the throne. The Kingdom of Italy was designated a secundogeniture for the second surviving son of Napoleon I Bonaparte but, failing such, provided for the emperor's stepson, Eugène de Beauharnais, to succeed, even though the latter had no blood relationship to the House of Bonaparte. Serbia's monarchy was hereditary by primogeniture for male descendants in the male line of Prince Alexander I, but upon extinction of that line, the reigning king could choose any among his male relatives of the House of Karađorđević. In Romania, on the other hand, upon extinction of the male line descended from Carol I of Romania, the constitution stipulated that the male line of his brother, Leopold, Prince of Hohenzollern, would inherit the throne and, failing other male line issue of that family, a prince of a "Western European" dynasty was to be chosen by the Romanian king and parliament. By contrast, older European monarchies tended to rely upon succession criteria that only called to the throne descendants of past monarchs according to fixed rules rooted in one or another pattern of laws or traditions.

== Vertical inheritance ==
In hereditary succession, the heir is automatically determined by pre-defined rules and principles. It can be further subdivided into horizontal and vertical methods, the former favoring siblings, whereas vertical favors children and grandchildren of the holder.

=== Male-preference cognatic primogeniture ===
Male-preference primogeniture diagram. Legend: Grey: incumbent; Square: male; Circle: female; Black: deceased; Diagonal: cannot be displaced (see heir apparent)

In male-preference primogeniture (in the past called cognatic primogeniture) the monarch's eldest son and his descendants take precedence over his siblings and their descendants. Elder sons take precedence over younger sons, but all sons take precedence over daughters. A female member of a dynasty can succeed to the throne if and only if she has no living brothers and no deceased brothers who left surviving legitimate descendants. Older daughters and their descendants take precedence over younger daughters and their descendants. Children represent their deceased ancestors, and the senior line of descent always takes precedence over the junior line, within each gender. The right of succession belongs to the eldest son of the reigning sovereign (see heir apparent), and next to the eldest son of the eldest son.

This is the system in Spain and Monaco, and was the system used in the ancient kingdoms of Portugal, of England and Scotland and later, the Kingdom of Great Britain and finally, the United Kingdom and the Commonwealth realms (although, during the Middle Ages, Scotland also supported tanistry and proximity of blood, through both male and female lines, due to the intermingling of Pictish and Gaelic succession rules).

With respect to hereditary titles, it is usually the rule everywhere in Scotland and baronies by writ in the United Kingdom, but usually these English baronies by writ go into abeyance when the last male titleholder dies leaving more than one surviving sister or more than one descendant in the legitimate female line of the original titleholder. In England, Fiefs or titles granted "in tail general" or to "heirs general" allow older sons to succeed before younger sons, but daughters are considered equal co-heirs to each other, which can result in abeyance. In the medieval period, actual practice varied with local custom. While women could inherit manors, power was usually exercised by their husbands (jure uxoris) or their sons (jure matris). However, in Scotland, Salic law or any of its variations have never been practised, nor abeyance, and all the hereditary titles are inherited through male-preference primogeniture, where in the extinction of a male line, the eldest sister automatically receives the titles, and rules in her own right, not in the right of her son. A famous example of this is Marjorie, Countess of Carrick, mother of Robert the Bruce, who was the Countess of Carrick in her own right.

A similar system was practised in many of the kingdoms of the Indian subcontinent from the Middle Ages to the Indian independence movement. In many of these kingdoms, adoption was allowed from a relative if a monarch did not have children, and the adopted child could succeed to the throne at the death of the monarch. Examples include Rajaram II of Satara, Shahu II of Satara and Princess Bharani Thirunal Parvathy Bayi, the mother of the reigning Queen Gowri Lakshmi Bayi of Travancore. Often, the wife or mother of a childless king succeeded to the throne and ruled in her own right until her death, after which the throne passed to the next closest relative. Prominent examples of this custom include Queen Didda of Kashmir, and Qudsia Begum, the Nawab of Bhopal. Razia Sultana of the Delhi Sultanate was a rare example of a queen who succeeded her father even when her brothers were alive.

=== Absolute cognatic primogeniture ===
Absolute cognatic primogeniture diagram. Legend: Grey: incumbent; Square: male; Circle: female; Black: deceased; Diagonal: cannot be displaced

Absolute primogeniture is a law in which the eldest child of the sovereign succeeds to the throne, regardless of gender, and females (and their descendants) enjoy the same right of succession as males. This is currently the system in Sweden (since 1980), the Netherlands (since 1983), Norway (since 1990), Belgium (since 1991), Denmark (since 2009), Luxembourg (since 2011), the United Kingdom and the Commonwealth realms (since 2013; only for those born after 28 October 2011), and Liechtenstein (since 2026; only for those born after 15 August 2026)

=== Agnatic succession (Salic law) ===
Agnatic primogeniture diagram. Legend: Grey: incumbent; Square: male; Black: deceased; Diagonal: cannot be displaced

The Salic law, or agnatic succession, restricted the pool of potential heirs to males of the patrilineage, and altogether excluded females of the dynasty and their descendants from the succession. The Salic law applied to the former royal or imperial houses of Albania, France, Italy, Romania, Yugoslavia, and Prussia/German Empire. It currently applies only to the Chrysanthemum Throne of Japan.

In 1830 in Spain the question whether or not the Salic law applied – and therefore, whether Ferdinand VII should be followed by his daughter Isabella or by his brother Charles – led to a series of civil wars and the formation of a pretender rival dynasty which still exists.

Generally, hereditary monarchies that operate under the Salic law also use primogeniture among male descendants in the male line to determine the rightful successor, although in earlier history agnatic seniority was more usual than primogeniture. Fiefs and titles granted "in tail male" or to "heirs male" follow this primogenitural form of succession. (Those granted to "heirs male of the body" are limited to the male-line descendants of the grantee; those to "heirs male general" may be inherited, after the extinction of the grantee's male-line descendants, by the male-line descendants of his father, paternal grandfather, etc.)

=== Agnatic-cognatic succession ===
Agnatic-cognatic primogeniture diagram. Legend: Grey: incumbent; Square: male; Circle: female; Black: deceased; Diagonal: cannot be displaced

Agnatic-cognatic (or semi-Salic) succession, prevalent in much of Europe since ancient times, is the restriction of succession to those descended from or related to a past or current monarch exclusively through the male line of descent: descendants through females were ineligible to inherit unless no males of the patrilineage remained alive.

In this form of succession, the succession is reserved first to all the male dynastic descendants of all the eligible branches by order of primogeniture, then upon total extinction of these male descendants to a female member of the dynasty. The only current monarchy that operated under semi-Salic law until recently is Luxembourg, which changed to absolute primogeniture in 2011. Former monarchies that operated under semi-Salic law included Austria (later Austria-Hungary), Bavaria, Hanover, Württemberg, Russia, Saxony, Tuscany, and the Kingdom of the Two Sicilies.

If a female descendant should take the throne, she will not necessarily be the senior heiress by primogeniture, but usually the nearest relative to the last male monarch of the dynasty by proximity of blood. Examples are Christian I of Denmark's succession to Schleswig-Holstein, Maria Theresa of Austria (although her right ultimately was confirmed in consequence of her victory in the War of the Austrian Succession launched over her accession), Marie-Adelaide and Charlotte of Luxembourg, Anne of Brittany, as well as Christian IX of Denmark's succession in the right of his wife, Louise of Hesse.

=== Matrilineal succession ===
Some cultures pass honours down through the female line. A man's wealth and title are inherited by his sister's children, and his children receive their inheritance from their maternal uncles.

In Kerala, southern India, a custom known as Marumakkathayam was practiced by the Nair nobility, the Malabar Muslims and the royal families. Through this system, descent and the inheritance of property were passed from the maternal uncle to nephews or nieces. The right of the child was with the maternal uncle or the mother's family rather than the father or the father's family. Through this bloodline, surnames, titles, properties, and everything of the child are inherited from his uncle or mother. Almost all the kingdoms in Kerala practised this system, including the Kingdom of Calicut, Kingdom of Cochin, the kingdom of Kolathunadu and the Kingdom of Valluvanad, to name a few. The Arakkal kingdom followed a similar matrilineal system of descent: the eldest member of the family, whether male or female, became its head and ruler; the male rulers were called Ali Rajah and the female rulers were called as Arakkal Beevis. Usually after one king, his nephew through his sister succeeded to the throne, and his own son receives a courtesy title but has no place in the line of succession. In the absence of nephews, nieces could also succeed to the kingdom, as in the case of Queen Gowri Lakshmi Bayi who was the queen regnant of Travancore from 1810 to 1813. Since Indian Independence and the passing of several acts such as the Hindu Succession Act (1956), this form of inheritance is no longer recognised by law. Regardless, the pretender to the Travancore throne is still determined by matrilinear succession.

The Akans of Ghana and the Ivory Coast, West Africa have similar matrilineal succession and as such Otumfuo Nana Osei Tutu II, Asantehene inherited the Golden Stool (the throne) through his mother (the Asantehemaa) Nana Afia Kobi Serwaa Ampem II.

=== Ultimogeniture ===
Agnatic ultimogeniture diagram. Legend: Grey: incumbent; Square: male; Black: deceased

Ultimogeniture is an order of succession where the subject is succeeded by the youngest son (or youngest child). This serves the circumstances where the youngest is "keeping the hearth", taking care of the parents and continuing at home, whereas elder children have had time to succeed "out in the world" and provide for themselves.

=== Proximity of blood ===
Proximity of blood diagram. Legend: Grey: incumbent; Square: male; Circle: female; Black: deceased; Diagonal: cannot be displaced

Proximity of blood is a system wherein the person closest in degree of kinship to the sovereign succeeds, preferring males over females and elder over younger siblings. This is sometimes used as a gloss for "pragmatic" successions in Europe; it had somewhat more standing during the Middle Ages everywhere in Europe. In Outremer it was often used to choose regents, and it figured in some of the succession disputes over the Kingdom of Jerusalem. It was also recognized in that kingdom for the succession of fiefs, under special circumstances: if a fief was lost to the Saracens and subsequently re-conquered, it was to be assigned to the heir in proximity of blood of the last fief-holder.

In Scotland, Robert de Brus tried to claim the Scottish crown by order of proximity. He was not successful, but his grandson later successfully claimed the crown as Robert I of Scotland.

=== Porphyrogeniture ===
Porphyrogeniture is a system of political succession that favours the rights of sons born after their father has become king or emperor, over older siblings born before their father's ascent to the throne.

Examples of this practice include Byzantium and the Nupe Kingdom. In late 11th century England and Normandy, the theory of porphyrogeniture was used by Henry I of England to justify why he, and not his older brother Robert Curthose, should inherit the throne after the death of their brother William Rufus.

=== Partible inheritance ===
In some societies, a monarchy or a fief was inherited in a way that all entitled heirs had a right to a share of it. The most prominent examples of this practice are the multiple divisions of the Frankish Empire under the Merovingian and Carolingian dynasties, and similarly Gavelkind in the British Isles.

==== Secundogeniture ====
A secundogeniture was a dependent territory given to a younger son of a princely house and his descendants, creating a cadet branch. This was a special form of inheritance in which the second and younger son received more possessions and prestige than the apanage which was usual in principalities practising primogeniture. It avoided the generational division of the estate to the extent that occurred under gavelkind, and at the same time gave younger branches a stake in the stability of the house.

In the rare cases in which the beneficiary was the third son in the order of succession, the second being already the holder of a secundogeniture, the domain given as a benefit was called a tertiogeniture.

== Horizontal inheritance ==
=== Seniority ===
Agnatic seniority diagram. Legend: Grey: incumbent; Square: male; Black: deceased; Diagonal: cannot be displaced

In seniority successions, a monarch's or fiefholder's next sibling (almost always brother), succeeds; not his children. And, if the royal house is more extensive, (male) cousins and so forth succeed, in order of seniority, which may depend upon actual age or upon the seniority between their fathers.

==== Rota system ====
Rota system diagram. Legend: Grey: incumbent; Half-grey: predecessor of incumbent; Square: male; Black: deceased; Diagonal: cannot be displaced; cross: excluded or Izgoi (excluded from succession due to their parent never having held the throne)

The rota system, from the Old Church Slavic word for "ladder" or "staircase", was a system of collateral succession practised (though imperfectly) in Kievan Rus' and later Appanage and early Muscovite Russia.

In this system, the throne passed not linearly from father to son, but laterally from brother to brother and then to the eldest son of the eldest brother who had held the throne. The system was begun by Yaroslav the Wise, who assigned each of his sons a principality based on seniority. When the Grand Prince died, the next most senior prince moved to Kiev and all others moved to the principality next up the ladder.

The Mutapa Empire in modern-day Zimbabwe had a similar system termed adelphic collateral succession, wherein the kingship rotated between royal houses, going from the eldest brother to the next-eldest brother until that generation was exhausted, then to the eldest brother's eldest son, on to the next-eldest brother's eldest son etc. In practice, succession often saw conflict between brothers and was decided by force, greatly weakening the state; Stan Mudenge wrote that of the 28 successions between 1692 and 1902, 16 involved conflict, 3 were peaceful, and 9 were unknown.

=== Tanistry ===
The Tanistry is a Gaelic system for passing on titles and lands. In this system the Tanist (Irish: Tánaiste; Scottish Gaelic: Tànaiste; Manx: Tanishtey) is the office of heir-apparent, or second-in-command, among the (royal) Gaelic patrilineal dynasties of Ireland, Scotland and Mann, to succeed to the chieftainship or to the kingship.

Historically the tanist was chosen from among the heads of the roydammna or "righdamhna" (literally, those of kingly material) or, alternatively, among all males of the sept, and elected by them in full assembly. The eligibility was based on descent from a king to a few degrees of proximity. Usually descent from the male lines of a king was the norm, however in Scotland, descent through the female lines of a king was also accepted, possibly because of an intermingling with the Pictish succession rules. An example of this is King Eochaid who claimed the Scottish throne as the son of the daughter of Kenneth I.

The composition and the governance of the clan were built upon descent from a similar ancestor. The office was noted from the beginning of recorded history in Ireland, and probably pre-dates it. A story about Cormac mac Airt refers to his eldest son as his tanist. Following his murder by a member of the Deisi, another roydammna, Eochaid Gonnat, succeeded as king.

The royal succession in Celtic Scotland was limited to the elective succession of the male descendants of Siol Alpein (House of Alpin) until the accession of King Malcolm II in 1005, who introduced the concept of hereditary monarchy in Scotland. He did so to try to eliminate the strife caused by the elective law, which encouraged rival claimants to fight for the throne. The earlier Pictish kingdoms had allowed female-line succession to the throne and in middle age Scotland, Pictish and Gaelic succession rules were intermingled. Since Malcolm had only daughters, the throne passed to his grandson through his eldest daughter and later, their descendants. The Irish monarchies, for their part, never at any stage allowed for female line succession.

== Elective succession ==
=== Appointment, election, tanistry, and rotation ===
Order of succession can be arranged by appointment: either the incumbent monarch or some electoral body appoints an heir or a list of heirs before vacancy occurs. A monarchy may be generally elective, although in a way that the next holder will be elected only after it becomes vacant.

In history, quite often, but not always, appointments and elections favored, or were limited to, members of a certain dynasty or extended family. There may be genealogical rules to determine all who are entitled to succeed, and who will be favored. This has led sometimes to an order of succession that balances branches of a dynasty by rotation.

It currently applies, with variations, to Andorra, Cambodia, Eswatini, the Holy See, Kuwait, Malaysia, the UAE, and Samoa. It is also used in Ife, Oyo and the other subnational states of the Yorubaland region.

=== Lateral succession ===
Lateral or fraternal system of succession mandates principles of seniority among members of a dynasty or dynastic clan, with a purpose of election a best qualified candidate for the leadership. The leaders are elected as being the most mature elders of the clan, already in possession of military power and competence. Fraternal succession is preferred to ensure that mature leaders are in charge, removing a need for regents. The lateral system of succession may or may not exclude female descendants in the male line from succession. In practice, when no male heir is mature enough, a female heir is usually determined "pragmatically", by proximity to the last monarch, like Boariks of the Caucasian Huns or Tamiris of Massagetes in Middle Asia were selected. The lateral monarch is generally elected after the leadership throne becomes vacant. In the early years of the Mongol empire, the death of the ruling monarchs, Genghis Khan and Ögedei Khan, immediately stopped the Mongols' western campaigns because of the upcoming elections.

In East Asia, the lateral succession system is first recorded in the pre-historical period starting with the late Shang dynasty's Wai Bing succeeding his brother Da Ding, and then in connection with a conquest by the Zhou of the Shang, when Wu Ding was succeeded by his brother Zu Geng in 1189 BC and then by another brother Zu Jia in 1178 BC.

A drawback of the lateral succession is that, while ensuring a most competent leadership for the moment, the system inherently created derelict princely lines not eligible for succession. Any scion of an eligible heir who did not live long enough to ascend to the throne was cast aside as not eligible, creating a pool of discontented pretenders called Tegin in Turkic and Izgoi in Rus dynastic lines. The unsettled pool of derelict princes would eventually bring havoc to the succession order and dismemberment to the state.

== Succession crises ==
When a monarch dies without a clear successor, a succession crisis often ensues, frequently resulting in a war of succession. For example, when King Charles IV of France died, the Hundred Years War erupted between Charles' cousin, Philip VI of France, and Charles' nephew, Edward III of England, to determine who would succeed Charles as the King of France. When the crown of Scotland became vacant in September 1290 on the death of the seven-year-old Queen Margaret, 13 claimants to the throne came forward. Where the line of succession is clear, it has sometimes happened that a pretender with a weak or spurious claim but military or political power usurps the throne.

In recent years researchers have found significant connections between the types of rules governing succession in monarchies and autocracies and the frequency with which coups or succession crises occur.

== Religion ==
In Tibetan Buddhism, it is believed that the holders of some high offices such as the Dalai Lama are reincarnations of the incumbent: the order of succession is simply that an incumbent is followed by a reincarnation of himself. When an incumbent dies, his successor is sought in the general population by certain criteria considered to indicate that the reincarnated Dalai Lama has been found, a process which typically takes two to four years to find the infant boy.

In the Catholic Church, there are prescribed procedures to be followed in the case of vacancy of the papacy or a bishopric.

== Republics ==
In republics, the requirement to ensure continuity of government at all times has resulted in most offices having some formalized order of succession. In a country with fixed-term elections, the head of state (president) is often succeeded following death, resignation, or impeachment by the vice president, parliament speaker, chancellor, or prime minister, in turn followed by various office holders of the legislative assembly or other government ministers. In many republics, a new election takes place some time after the "presidency" becomes unexpectedly vacant.

In states or provinces within a country, frequently a lieutenant governor or deputy governor is elected to fill a vacancy in the office of the governor.

Example of succession

- If the President of the United States is unable to serve, the Vice President takes over if able to serve. If not, the order of succession is Speaker of the House, President pro tempore of the Senate, Secretary of State, and other cabinet officials as listed in the article United States presidential line of succession.
- In Republic of Korea, If the president is unable to serve, the prime minister takes over if able to serve. If not, the order of succession is the minister of Economy and Finance, minister of Education etc. There is no vice president, and a new president has to be elected if the president dies or resigns.
- In Finland, the president's temporary successor is the prime minister and then the ministers in the order of days spent in office, instead of in order of ministry. There is no vice president, and a new president has to be elected if the president dies or resigns.
- In Israel, the president's temporary successor is the Speaker of the Knesset (the Israeli parliament), with the new president being elected by the parliament if the president dies or resigns.
- In India, If the office of the President of India becomes vacant due to death, resignation, removal, or otherwise, the Vice President of India takes over as the Acting President until a new President is elected. If both the President and Vice President's offices are vacant simultaneously, the Chief Justice of India may act as the President of India until a new President is elected.
- In Kazakhstan the president's temporary successor is the Chairman of the Senate who becomes Acting President. If that office is unavailable, the Chairman of the Mäjilis takes over, followed by the Prime Minister, until a new presidential election is held in accordance with the Constitution.

== See also ==
- Abdication
- Bayaa
- Continuity of government
- Crown prince
- Enthronement
- Inheritance
- List of monarchies by order of succession
- Order of precedence
- Posthumous birth
- Presidential Succession Act
- Royal House
- Sede vacante
- Shadow government (disambiguation)
- Succession crisis
