= List of monarchies by order of succession =

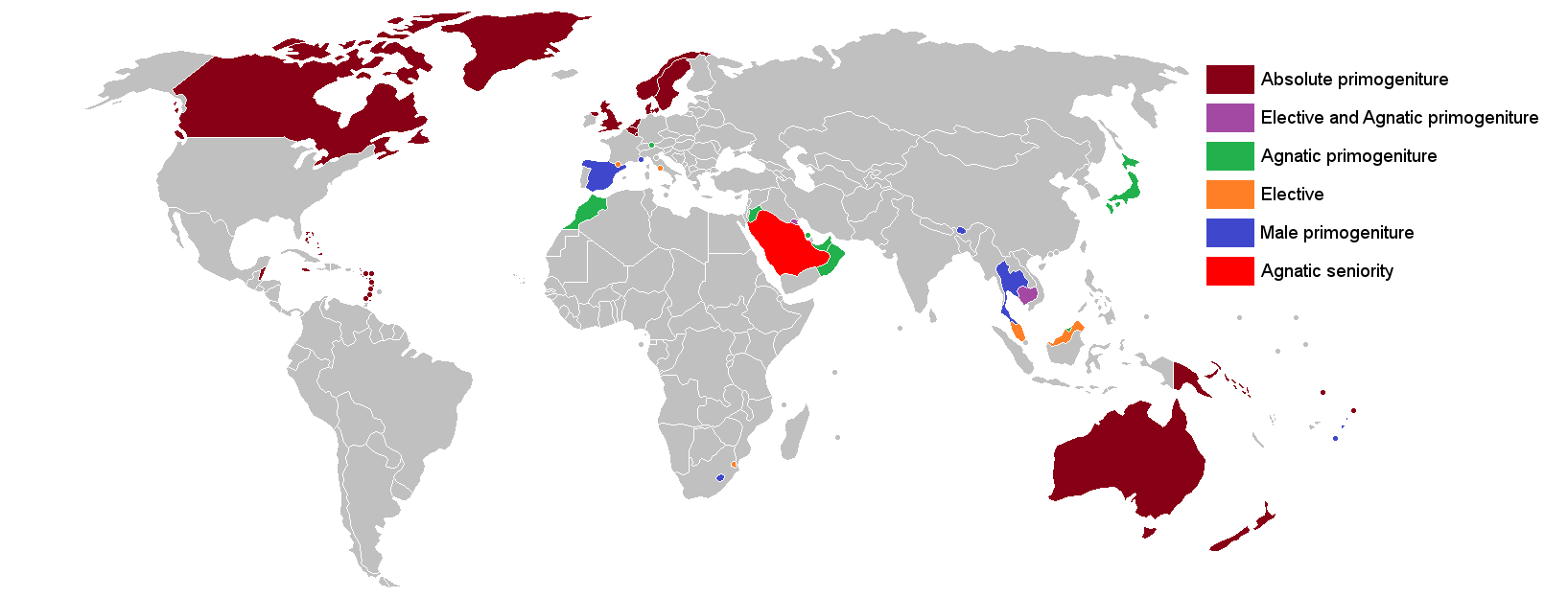
World monarchies by succession. Absolute primogeniture Elective and Agnatic primogeniture Agnatic primogeniture Elective Male-primogeniture Agnatic seniority

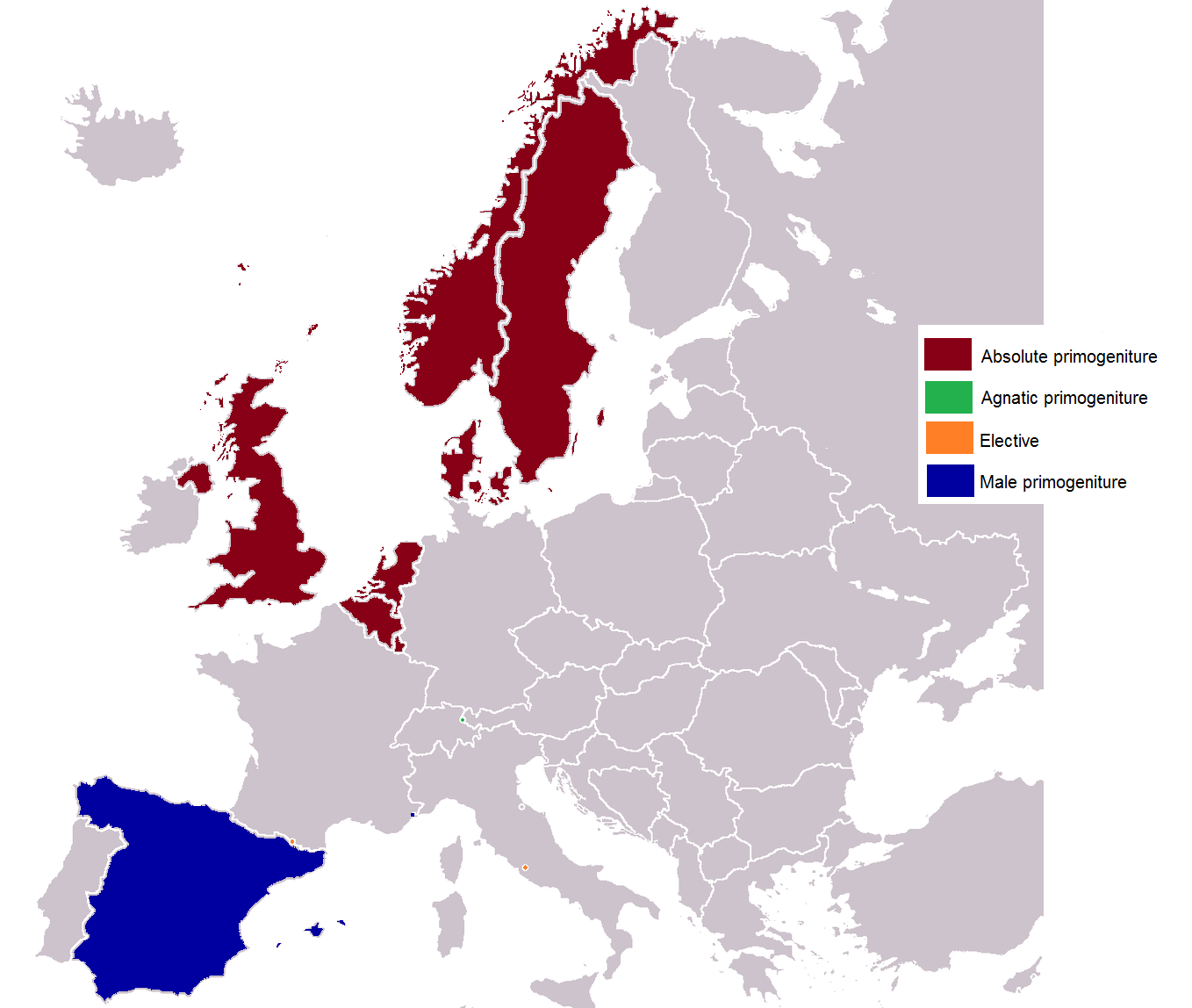
European monarchies by succession. Absolute primogeniture Agnatic primogeniture Elective Male-primogeniture

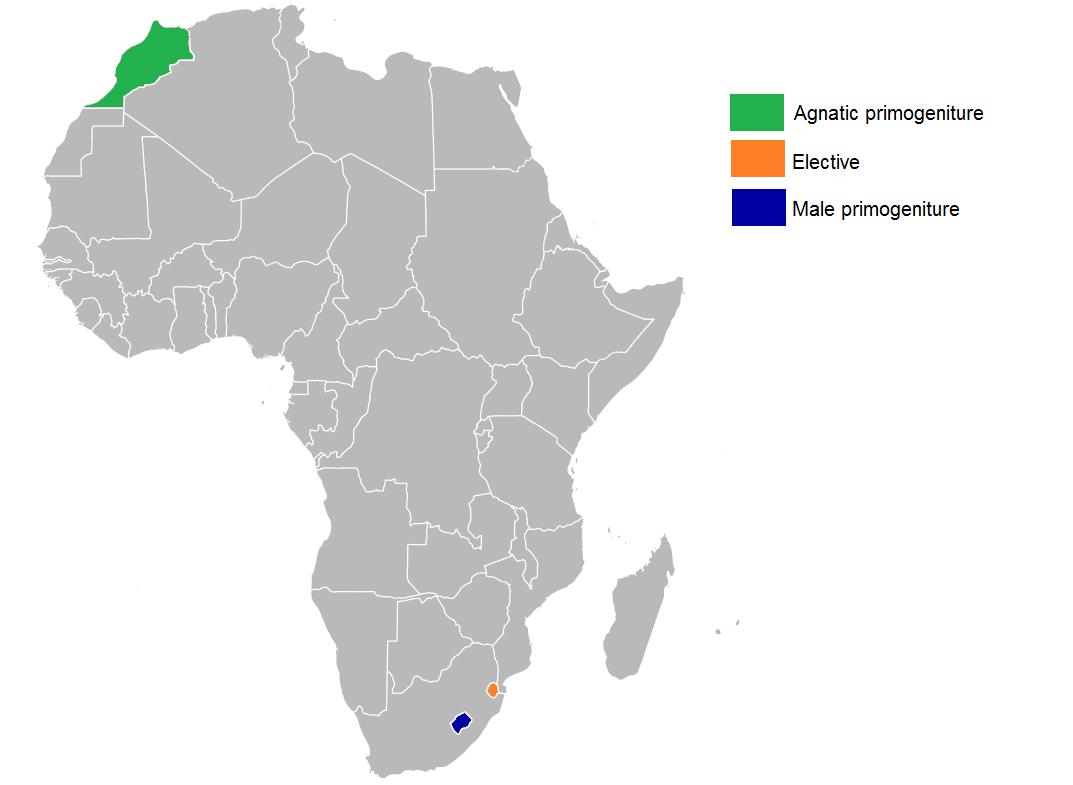
African monarchies by succession. Agnatic primogeniture Elective Male-primogeniture

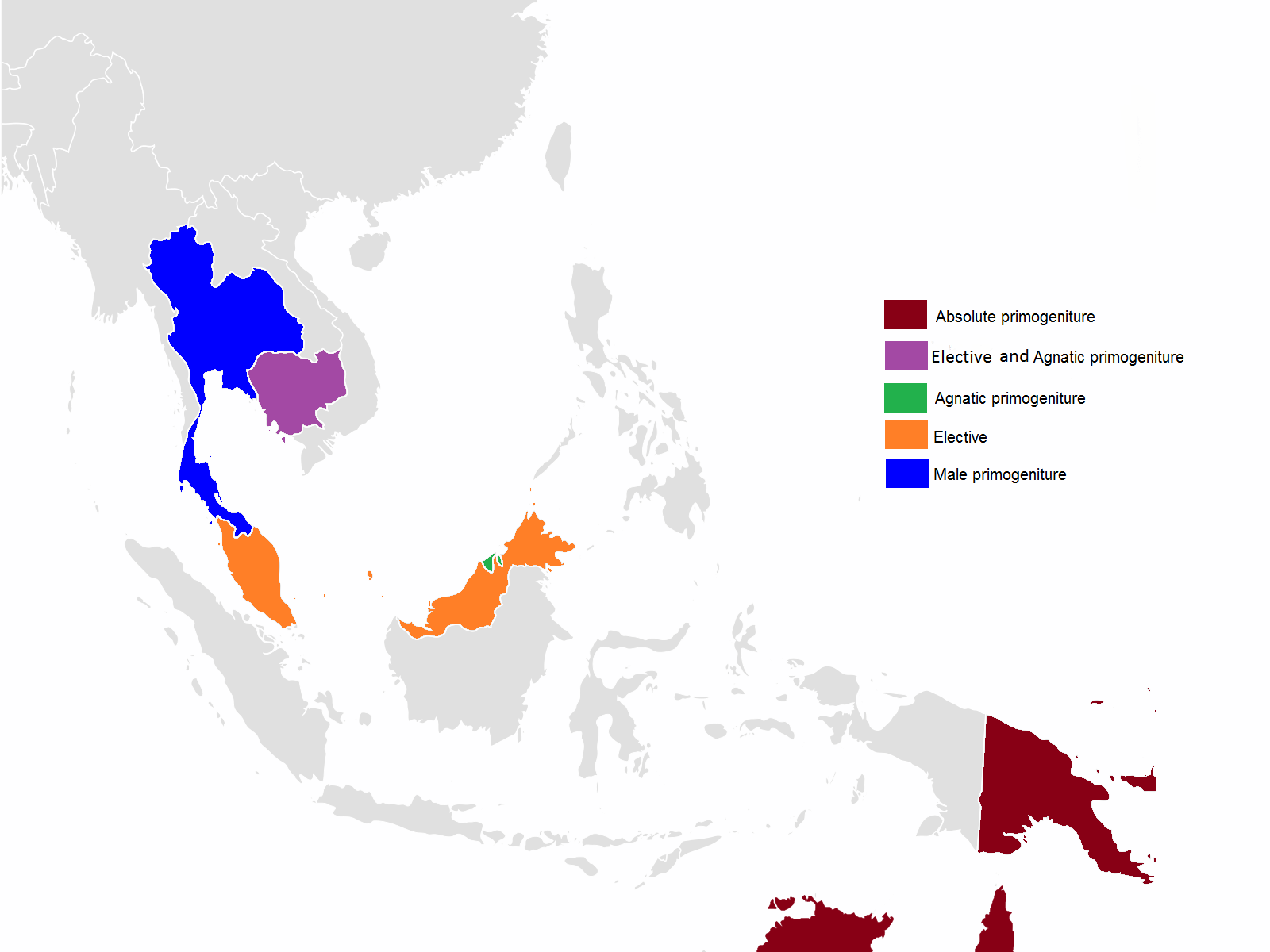
Southeast Asian monarchies by succession. Absolute primogeniture Elective and Agnatic primogeniture Agnatic primogeniture Elective Male-primogeniture

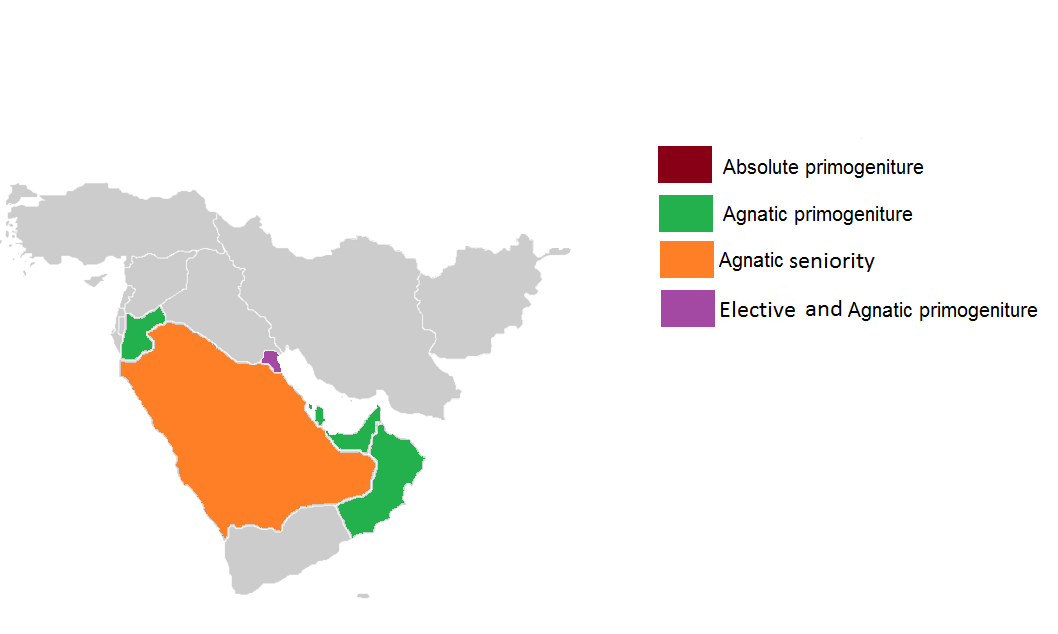
Middle Eastern monarchies by succession. Absolute primogeniture Elective and Agnatic primogeniture Agnatic primogeniture Agnatic seniority Male-primogeniture

This is a list of current monarchies by order of succession (hereditary (Note: Decided by primogeniture.) and elective).

== Current monarchies ==
Monarchy	Title	Mode of succession
Principality of Andorra	Co-princes	Appointment by the pope (episcopal co-prince); Elective (French co-prince)
Antigua and Barbuda	King	Absolute primogeniture
Commonwealth of Australia	King	Absolute primogeniture
Commonwealth of the Bahamas	King	Absolute primogeniture
Kingdom of Bahrain	King	Agnatic primogeniture
Kingdom of Belgium	King	Absolute primogeniture
Belize	King	Absolute primogeniture
Kingdom of Bhutan	King	Male primogeniture
Brunei Darussalam	Sultan	Agnatic primogeniture
Kingdom of Cambodia	King	Elective and agnatic primogeniture
Canada	King	Absolute primogeniture
Kingdom of Denmark	King	Absolute primogeniture
Kingdom of Eswatini	Ngwenyama (King)	Elective
Grenada	King	Absolute primogeniture
Jamaica	King	Absolute primogeniture
Japan	Emperor	Agnatic primogeniture
State of Kuwait	Emir	Elective and agnatic primogeniture
Hashemite Kingdom of Jordan	King	Agnatic primogeniture
Kingdom of Lesotho	King	Male primogeniture
Principality of Liechtenstein	Sovereign Prince	Absolute primogeniture
Grand Duchy of Luxembourg	Grand Duke	Absolute primogeniture
Federation of Malaysia	Yang di-Pertuan Agong	Elective
Principality of Monaco	Sovereign Prince	Male primogeniture
Kingdom of Morocco	King	Agnatic primogeniture
Kingdom of the Netherlands	King	Absolute primogeniture
New Zealand	King	Absolute primogeniture
Kingdom of Norway	King	Absolute primogeniture
Sultanate of Oman	Sultan	Agnatic primogeniture
Independent State of Papua New Guinea	King	Absolute primogeniture
Federation of Saint Kitts and Nevis	King	Absolute primogeniture
Saint Lucia	King	Absolute primogeniture
Saint Vincent and the Grenadines	King	Absolute primogeniture
Kingdom of Saudi Arabia	King	Agnatic seniority
Solomon Islands	King	Absolute primogeniture
Kingdom of Spain	King	Male primogeniture
Kingdom of Sweden	King	Absolute primogeniture
State of Qatar	Emir	Agnatic primogeniture
Kingdom of Thailand	King	Male primogeniture
Kingdom of Tonga	King	Male primogeniture
Tuvalu	King	Absolute primogeniture
United Arab Emirates	President	Agnatic primogeniture
United Kingdom of Great Britain and Northern Ireland	King	Absolute primogeniture
Vatican City State	Pope	Elective

== See also ==
- List of monarchies
