= Moti Masjid =

Moti Masjid (lit. 'Pearl Mosque'), may refer to several mosques:

- Moti Masjid (Agra Fort), located inside the Agra Fort in Agra, India, built around 1647-53 by Mughal emperor Shah Jahan
- Moti Masjid (Red Fort), located inside the Red Fort in Delhi, India, built in 1659-60 by Mughal emperor Aurangzeb
- Moti Masjid (Lahore Fort), located inside the Lahore Fort in Lahore, Pakistan, built in 1630–35
- Moti Masjid (Mehrauli), a mosque in Delhi, India
- Moti Masjid, Bhopal, a mosque in Bhopal, India
