= Primogeniture =

Inheritance by the eldest, usually male, child

Primogeniture (/ˌpraɪməˈdʒɛnɪtʃər, -oʊ-/) is the right, by law or custom, of the firstborn legitimate child to inherit all or most of their parent's estate, as well as succeed their parent as the ruler of a state.

Primogeniture stands in contrast to shared inheritance among all or some children, any illegitimate child or any collateral relative. In most contexts, it means the inheritance of the firstborn son (agnatic primogeniture). It can also mean by the firstborn daughter (matrilineal primogeniture), or firstborn child (absolute primogeniture).

Research shows that authoritarian regimes that rely on primogeniture for succession were more stable than forms of authoritarian rule with alternative succession arrangements. Scholars have linked primogeniture to a decline in regicide, as clear rules of succession reduce the number of people who could (absent a coup d'état) replace a ruler, thus making it less desirable to cause the death of the monarch.

== Description ==
The common definition given is also known as male-line primogeniture, the classical form popular in European jurisdictions among others until into the 20th century. In the absence of male-line offspring, variations were expounded to entitle a daughter or a brother or, in the absence of either, to another collateral relative, in a specified order (e.g., male-preference primogeniture, Salic primogeniture, semi-Salic primogeniture). Variations have tempered the traditional, sole-beneficiary, right (such as French appanage) or, in the West since World War II, eliminate the preference for males over females (absolute male-preference primogeniture). Most monarchies in Europe have eliminated this, including: Belgium, Denmark, Liechtenstein, Luxembourg, Netherlands, Norway, Sweden and the United Kingdom. The exceptions are Spain and Monaco (male-preference primogeniture).

English primogeniture endures mainly in titles of nobility: any first-placed direct male-line descendant (e.g. eldest son's son's son) inherits the title before siblings and similar, this being termed "by right of substitution" for the deceased heir; secondly where children were only daughters they would enjoy the fettered use (life use) of an equal amount of the underlying real asset and the substantive free use (such as one-half inheritance) would accrue to their most senior-line male descendant or contingent on her marriage (moieties); thirdly, where the late estate holder had no descendants his oldest brother would succeed, and his descendants would likewise enjoy the rule of substitution where he had died. The effect of English primogeniture was to keep estates undivided wherever possible and to disinherit real property from female relations unless only daughters survived in which case the estate thus normally results in division. The principle has applied in history to inheritance of land as well as inherited titles and offices, most notably monarchies, continuing until modified or abolished.

Other forms of inheritance in monarchies have existed or continue. Currently, succession to the Saudi Arabian throne uses a form of lateral agnatic seniority, as did the Kievan Rus' (see Rota system), the early Kingdom of Scotland (see Tanistry), the Mongol Empire (see lateral succession) or the later Ottoman Empire (see succession practices).

Some monarchies have (at least in principle) no element of heredity in their laws of succession at all and monarchs are elected. The Holy Roman Emperor was chosen by a small number of powerful prince electors from among Imperial magnates, while kings of Poland-Lithuania were elected directly by the nobility. Intermediate arrangements also exist, such as restricting eligible candidates to members of a dynasty (as is currently done in Cambodia).

Tanistry refers to inheritance by "the most talented male member of the royal dynasty."

Research shows that authoritarian regimes that rely on primogeniture for succession were more stable than forms of authoritarian rule with alternative succession arrangements. Scholars have linked primogeniture to a decline in regicide, as clear rules of succession reduce the number of people who could (absent a coup d'état) replace a ruler, thus making it less desirable to cause the death of the monarch.

== Order of succession in monarchies ==
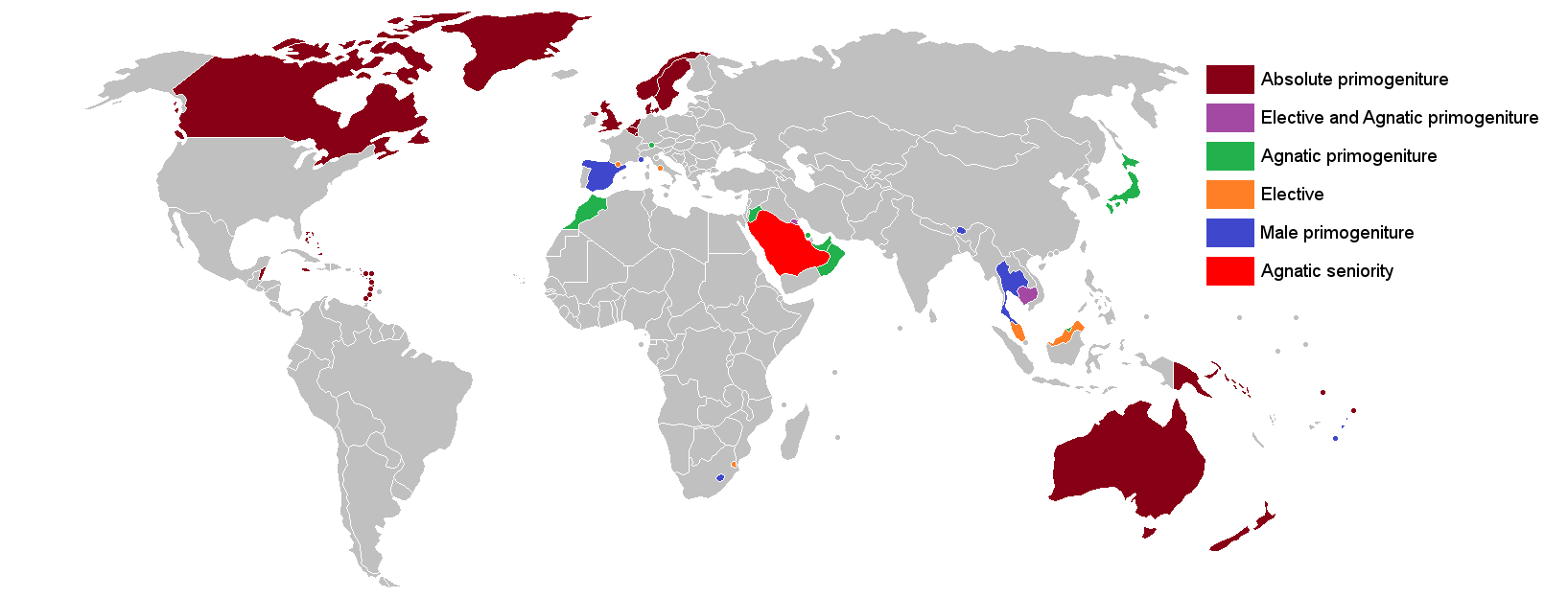
World monarchies by succession: Absolute primogeniture Elective and agnatic primogeniture Agnatic primogeniture Elective Male-preference primogeniture Agnatic seniority

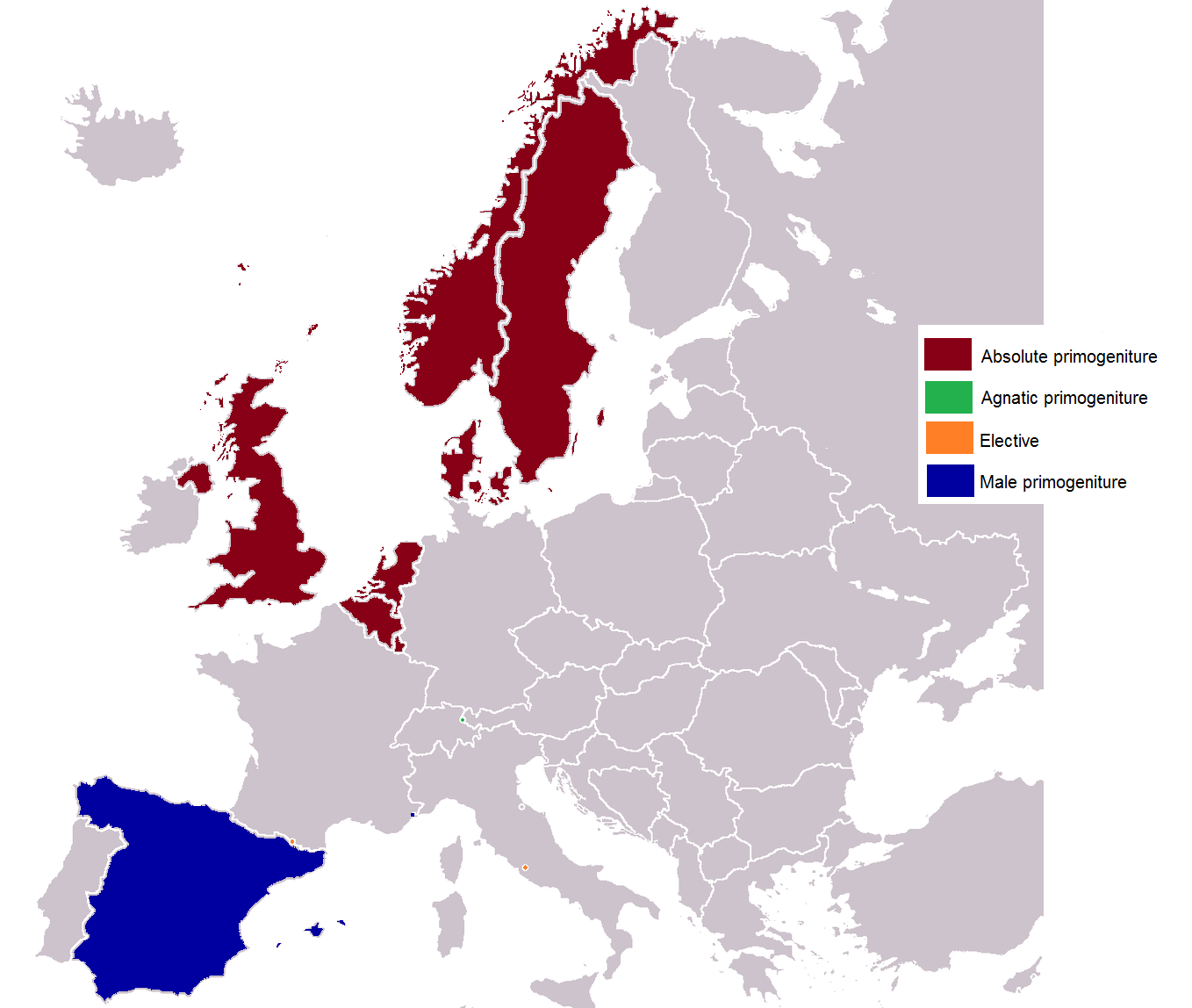
European monarchies by succession: Absolute primogeniture Absolute primogeniture Elective Male-preference primogeniture

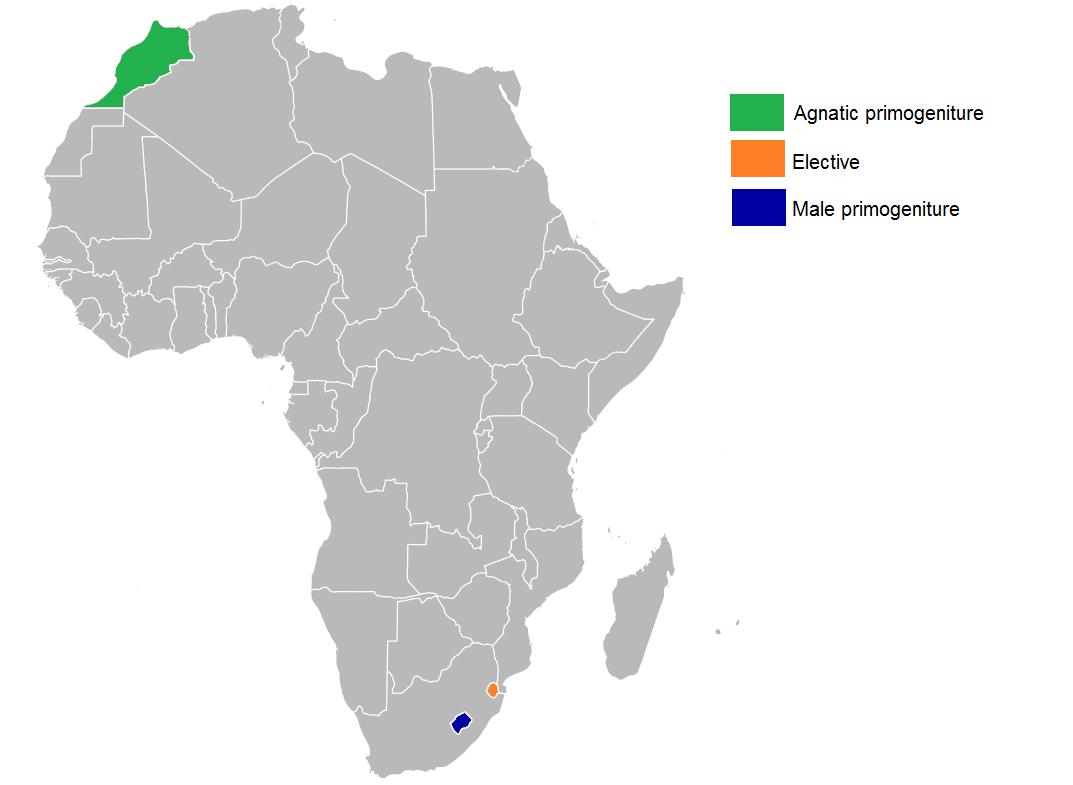
African monarchies by succession: Agnatic primogeniture Elective Male-preference primogeniture

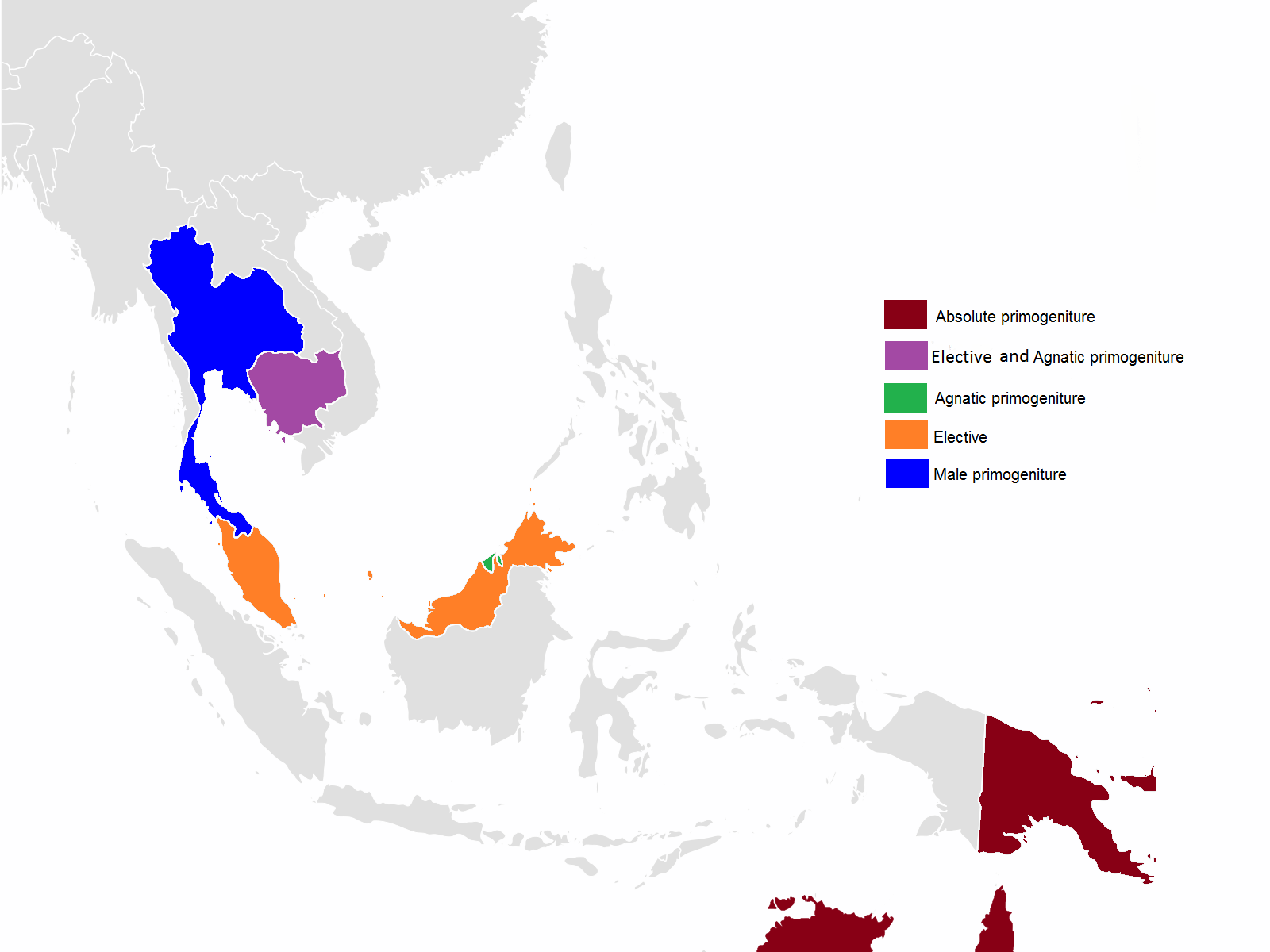
Southeast Asian monarchies by succession: Absolute primogeniture Elective and agnatic primogeniture Agnatic primogeniture Elective Male-preference primogeniture

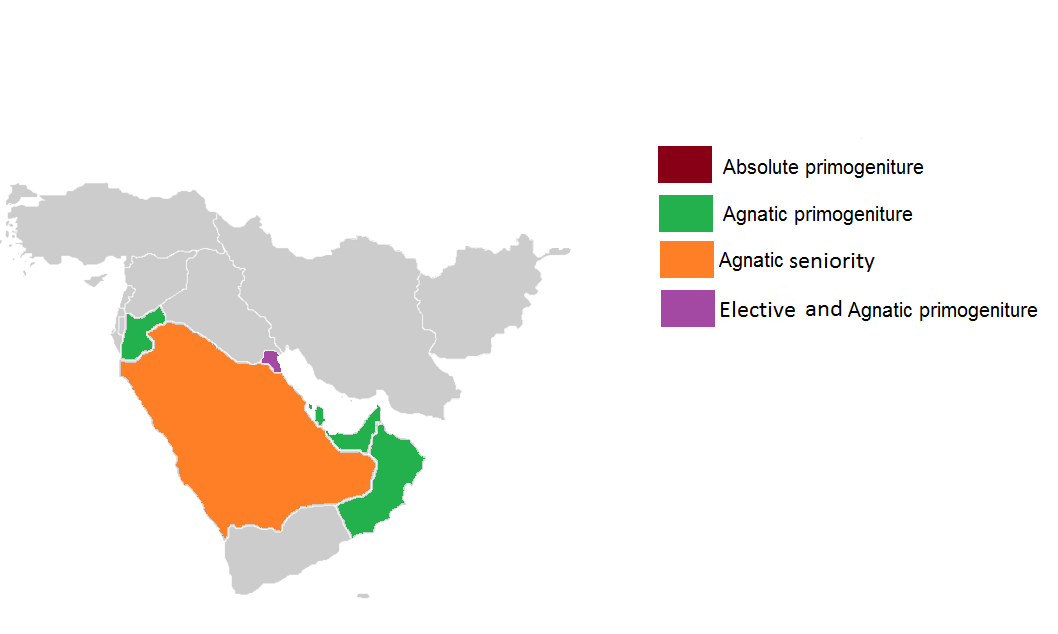
Southwest Asian monarchies by succession: Absolute primogeniture Elective and agnatic primogeniture Agnatic primogeniture Agnatic seniority

=== Absolute primogeniture ===
Absolute cognatic primogeniture diagram. Legend: Grey: incumbent; Square: male; Circle: female; Black: deceased; Diagonal: cannot be displaced

Absolute, equal, (full) cognatic or lineal primogeniture is a form of primogeniture in which sex is irrelevant for inheritance; the oldest surviving child without regard to sex inherits the throne. Mathematically this is a depth-first search.

==== History ====
No monarchy implemented this form of primogeniture before 1980, when Sweden amended its Act of Succession to adopt it in royal succession. This displaced King Carl XVI Gustaf's infant son, Prince Carl Philip, in favor of his elder daughter, Princess Victoria. Several monarchies have since followed suit: the Netherlands in 1983, Norway in 1990 (not retroactively), Belgium in 1991, Denmark in 2009, Luxembourg in 2011, and Liechtenstein in 2026 (also not retroactively). In 2011, the governments of the 16 Commonwealth realms which had a common monarch—Elizabeth II at that date—announced the Perth Agreement, a plan to legislate changes to absolute primogeniture. This came into effect with the necessary legislation on 26 March 2015. Other monarchies have considered changing to absolute primogeniture:

- With the birth of Infanta Leonor of Spain on 31 October 2005 to the then heir apparent Felipe, Prince of Asturias, and Princess Letizia, the Spanish Prime Minister José Luis Rodríguez Zapatero reaffirmed the intention of the government to institute, by amendment of the Spanish constitution, absolute primogeniture. Zapatero's proposal was supported by the leader of the main opposition party, the conservative Partido Popular, making its passage probable. However, Zapatero's administration ended before an amendment was drafted, and the succeeding governments have not pursued it. The Prince counseled reformers that there was plenty of time before any constitutional amendment would need to be enacted because the expectation was to leave him next in line to succeed his father despite his elder sisters' continued status as dynasts; equal primogeniture was expected to apply first to his children. Felipe succeeded to the throne as Felipe VI upon his father's abdication in 2014, by which time he had two daughters. Felipe VI has no son that would, absent the constitutional amendment, displace Leonor as heir.
- In July 2006, the Nepalese government proposed adopting absolute primogeniture, but the monarchy was abolished in 2008 before the change could be effected.
- In Japan, it was debated whether to adopt absolute primogeniture, as Princess Aiko was the only child of Emperor Naruhito. The 2006 birth of Prince Hisahito, a son of Prince Akishino (the younger brother of Naruhito, and next in line to the Chrysanthemum Throne) suspended the debate.
- In August 2026, the Principality of Liechtenstein changed its succession law to absolute primogeniture to allow women to inherit the throne. Prior to this, it was the only monarchy in Europe to practice agnatic primogeniture.

Monaco, the Netherlands, and Norway also deviated from traditional primogeniture in the late 20th or early 21st century by restricting succession to the crown to relatives within a specified degree of kinship to the most recent monarch.

=== Agnatic primogeniture ===
Agnatic primogeniture diagram. Legend: Grey: incumbent; Square: male; Black: deceased; Diagonal: cannot be displaced

Agnatic primogeniture or patrilineal primogeniture is inheritance according to seniority of birth among the sons of a monarch or head of family, with sons inheriting before brothers, and male-line male descendants inheriting before collateral male relatives in the male line, and to the total exclusion of females and descendants through females. This exclusion of females from dynastic succession is also referred to as application of the Salic law.

=== Agnatic-cognatic primogeniture ===
Agnatic-cognatic primogeniture diagram. Legend: Grey: incumbent; Square: male; Circle: female; Black: deceased; Diagonal: cannot be displaced

Another variation on agnatic primogeniture is the so-called semi-Salic law, or "agnatic-cognatic primogeniture", which allows women to succeed only at the extinction of all the male descendants in the male line of the particular legislator. Such were the cases of Bourbon Spain until 1833 and the dominions of Austria-Hungary, as well as most realms within the former Holy Roman Empire, i.e. most German monarchies. This was also the law of Russia under the Pauline Laws of 1797 and of Luxembourg until absolute primogeniture was introduced on 20 June 2011.

There are various versions of semi-Salic law also, although in all forms women do not succeed by application of the same kind of primogeniture as was in effect among males in the family. Rather, the female who is nearest in kinship to the last male monarch of the family inherits, even if another female of the dynasty is senior by primogeniture. Among sisters (and the lines of descendants issuing from them), the elder are preferred to the younger. In reckoning consanguinity or proximity of blood the dynasty's house law defines who among female relatives is "nearest" to the last male.

=== Male-preference (cognatic) primogeniture ===
Male-preference primogeniture diagram. Legend: Grey: incumbent; Square: male; Circle: female; Black: deceased; Diagonal: cannot be displaced

Male-preference primogeniture (in the past called cognatic primogeniture) provides that a dynast's sons and their lines of descent all come before the dynast's daughters and their lines. Older sons and their lines come before younger sons and their lines. It accords succession to the throne to a female member of a dynasty if and only if she has no living brothers and no deceased brothers who left surviving legitimate descendants. Then, older daughters and their lines come before younger daughters and their lines, thus a daughter inherits before her uncle and his descendants.

It was practised in the succession to the different medieval kingdoms of the United Kingdom and the Iberian Peninsula. The United Kingdom changed it to absolute primogeniture (to the eldest legitimate child, regardless of sex), through the Succession to the Crown Act 2013 (effective March 26, 2015). This rule change was simultaneously adopted by the other Commonwealth realms that have the same monarch as their head of state. With respect to hereditary titles, it is usually the rule everywhere in Scotland and baronies by writ in England, but usually these baronies by writ go into abeyance when the last male titleholder dies leaving more than one surviving sister or more than one descendant in the legitimate female line of the original titleholder. In England, Fiefs or titles granted "in tail general" or to "heirs general" allow older sons to succeed before younger sons, but daughters are considered equal co-heirs to each other, which can result in abeyance. In the medieval period, actual practice varied with local custom. While women could inherit manors, power was usually exercised by their husbands (jure uxoris) or their sons (jure matris). However, in Scotland, neither Salic law or any of its variations have ever been practised, nor abeyance, and all the hereditary titles are inherited through male-preference primogeniture, where in the extinction of a male line, the eldest sister automatically receives the titles, and rules in her own right, not in the right of her son. A famous example of this is Marjorie, Countess of Carrick, mother of Robert the Bruce, who was the Countess of Carrick in her own right.

A similar system was practised in many of the kingdoms of the Indian subcontinent from the Middle Ages to the Indian independence movement. In many of these kingdoms, adoption was allowed from a relative if a monarch did not have children, and the adopted child could succeed to the throne at the death of the monarch. Examples include Rajaram II of Satara, Shahu II of Satara and Princess Bharani Thirunal Parvathy Bayi, the mother of the reigning Queen Gowri Lakshmi Bayi of Travancore. Often, the wife or mother of a childless king were allowed to succeed to the throne as well and allowed to rule in their own right, until their death, after which the throne passed to the next closest relative. Prominent examples of this custom include Queen Didda of Kashmir, and Qudsia Begum, the Nawab of Bhopal. Razia Sultana of the Delhi Sultanate was a rare example of a queen who succeeded her father even when her brothers were alive.

Male-preference primogeniture is currently practised in succession to the thrones of Monaco (since 1454) and Spain (before 1700 and since 1830).

=== Matrilineal primogeniture ===
Matrilineal primogeniture is a form of succession in which the eldest female child inherits the throne, to the exclusion of males.

Some traditional kingdoms in Africa, such as Kumbwada, Arnado Debbo, and Nhakatolo of Luvale, has been only ruled by hereditary queens.

The Rain Queen of the Balobedu nation has been cited as an example of matrilineal primogeniture. Since 1800, the Balobedu Royal Council has appointed only female descendants to the queenship. The position has been unoccupied and stewarded by a regent since the death of Makobo Modjadji, the most recent Rain Queen, in 2005. The Balobedu Royal Council has not published information concerning its succession norms, but among the Limpopo tribe, it was widely expected that the late Rain Queen's daughter, Masalanabo, would succeed to the queenship upon turning 18. A ceremony to celebrate her anticipated queenship was officially held in 2018. In May 2021, however, the Royal Council announced that Masalanabo would instead be appointed khadi-kholo (great aunt). The late queen's son, Lekukela was installed in October 2022, becoming the first Rain King since the 18th century. The matter remains legally contested.

In Kerala, southern India, a custom known as Marumakkathayam was practiced by the Nair nobility, the Malabar Muslims and royal families. Through this system, descent and the inheritance of property were passed from the maternal uncle to nephews or nieces. The right of the child was with the maternal uncle or the mother's family rather than the father or the father's family. Through this bloodline, surnames, titles, properties, and everything of the child are inherited from his uncle or mother. Almost all the kingdoms in Kerala practised this system, including the Kingdom of Calicut, Kingdom of Cochin, the kingdom of Kolathunadu and the Kingdom of Valluvanad, to name a few. The Arakkal kingdom followed a similar matrilineal system of descent: the eldest member of the family, whether male or female, became its head and ruler; the male rulers were called Ali Rajah and female rulers were called as Arakkal Beevis. Usually after one king, his nephew through his sister succeeded to the throne, and his own son receives a courtesy title but has no place in the line of succession. In the absence of nephews, nieces could also succeed to the kingdom, as in the case of Queen Gowri Lakshmi Bayi who was the queen regnant from 1810 to 1813. Since Indian Independence and the passing of several acts such as the Hindu Succession Act (1956), this form of inheritance is no longer recognised by law. Regardless, the pretender to the Travancore throne is still determined by matrilinear succession.

The Akans of Ghana and the Ivory Coast, West Africa have similar matrilineal succession and as such Otumfuo Nana Osei Tutu II, Asantehene inherited the Golden Stool (the throne) through his mother (the Asantehemaa) Nana Afia Kobi Serwaa Ampem II.

== Effects ==
Primogeniture by definition prevents the subdivision of estates. This lessens family pressures to sell property, such as if two (or more) children inherit a house and cannot afford to buy out the other(s).

In much of Europe, younger sons of the nobility had no prospect of inheriting by death any property, and commonly sought careers in the Church, in military service (see purchase of commissions in the British Army), or in government. Some wills made bequests to a monastic order for an already suitably educated, disinherited son.

Many of the Spanish Conquistadors were younger sons who had to make their fortune in war. In the late 17th and early 18th centuries, many younger sons of English aristocrats chose to leave England for Virginia in the Colonies. Many of the early Virginians who were plantation owners were younger sons of landed gentry, who left Britain and Ireland fortuneless due to primogeniture. These were key ancestors of the Founding Fathers of the United States of America.

In Democracy in America, Alexis de Tocqueville observes that abolition of primogeniture and entail as to property results in faster division of land. However, primogeniture, in forcing landless people to seek wealth outside the family estate to maintain their standard of living accelerated the death of the landed aristocracy and, in his view, thus, quickened the shift to democracy.

== History ==
In Christian Europe, the Catholic Church originally had a monopoly on the authority to sanction marriage. Its teachings forbid polygamy and state divorce is an impossibility per se. Consequently, in Europe, given morbidity and infertility, succession could not be assured solely by direct male descendants or even direct male or female progeny. In Islamic and Asian cultures, religious officials and customs either sanctioned polygyny, use of consorts, or both, or they had no authority of marriage; monarchs could consequently ensure sufficient numbers of male offspring to assure succession. In such cultures, female heads of state were rare.

=== Biblical ===
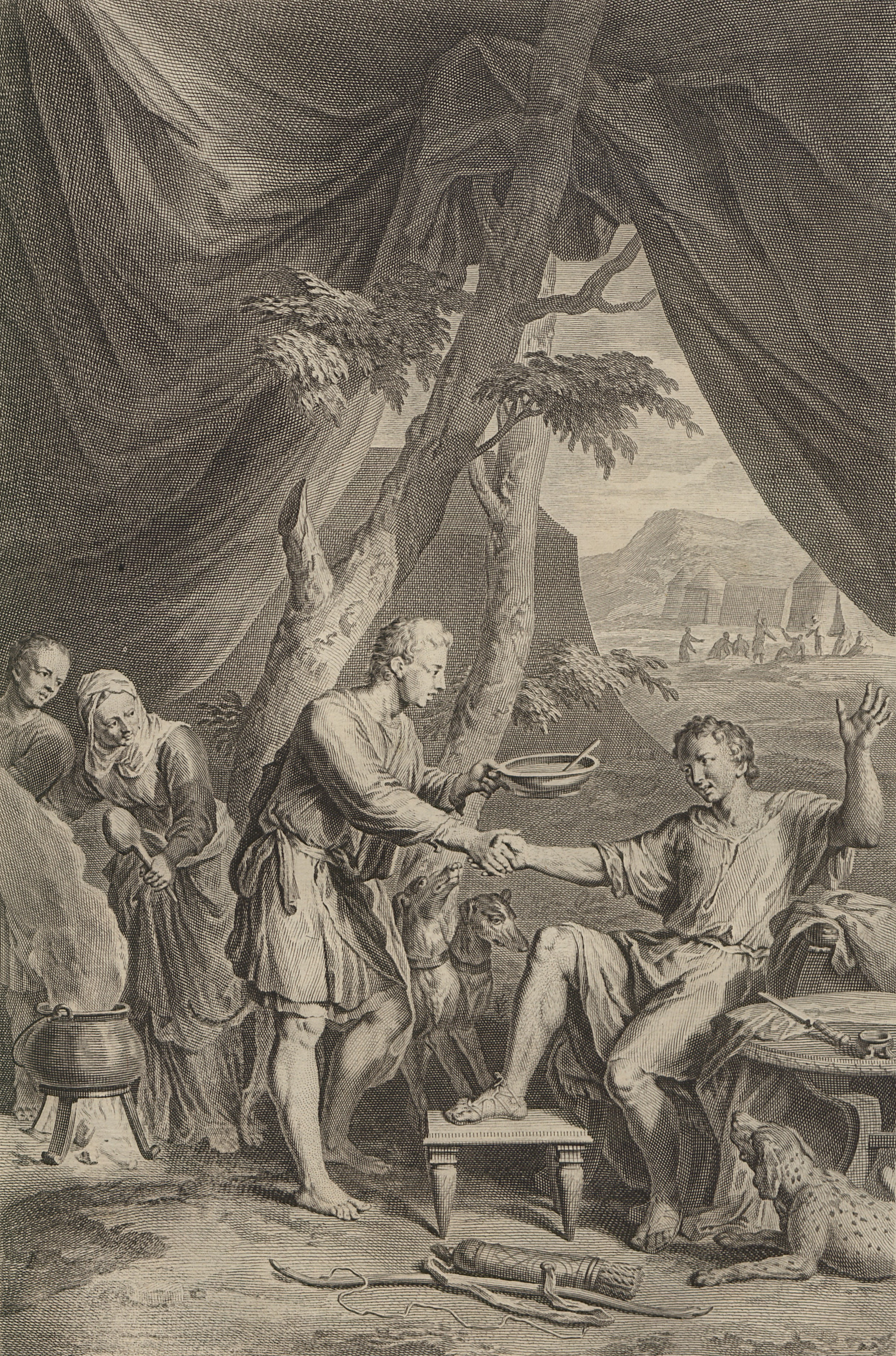
Esau Sells His Birthright for Pottage of Lentils, a 1728 engraving by Gerard Hoet

The earliest account of primogeniture to be known widely in modern times is that of Isaac's sons Esau, who was born first, and Jacob, who was born second. Esau was entitled to the "birthright" (bekhorah בְּכוֹרָה), but he sold the right to Jacob for a mess of pottage, i. e. a small amount of lentil stew. This passage demonstrates that primogeniture was known in the Middle East prior to the Roman Empire.

A woman's right and obligation to inherit property in the absence of a male heir in the family was recorded in the case of the Daughters of Zelophehad in Numbers 27.

=== Roman law ===
During the Roman Empire, Roman law governed much of Europe, and the laws pertaining to inheritance made no distinction between the oldest or youngest, male or female, if the decedent died intestate. Although admission to the two highest ordines (orders), i.e. the senators and equestrians, potentially brought lifelong privileges that the next generation could inherit, the principle of inherited rank in general was little used. Rather, Roman aristocracy was based on competition, and a Roman family could not maintain its position in the ordines merely by hereditary succession or title to land. Although the eldest son typically carried his father's name in some form, he was expected to construct his own career based on competence as an administrator or general and on remaining in favor with the emperor and his council at court. Other than meeting requirements for personal wealth, the qualifications for belonging to the senatorial or equestrian orders varied from generation to generation, and in the later Empire, the dignitas ("esteem") that attended on senatorial or equestrian rank was refined further with additional titles, such as vir illustris, that were not inherited.

Most Roman emperors indicated their choice of successor, usually a close family member or adopted heir, and the presumption that the eldest or even a natural son would inherit was not enshrined. The death of an emperor led to a critical period of uncertainty and crisis. In theory, the Senate was entitled to choose the new emperor, but did so mindful of acclamation by the army or the Praetorian Guard. Thus, neither an emperor nor his heir had an inherent "right" to rule, and did so through military power and the Senate's symbolic consent.

=== Reemergence in medieval and modern times ===
The law of primogeniture in Europe has its origins in Medieval Europe where the feudal system necessitated that the estates of land-owning feudal lords be kept as large and as united as possible to maintain social stability as well as the wealth, power and social standing of their families.

Adam Smith, in his book An Inquiry into the Nature and Causes of the Wealth of Nations, explains the origin of primogeniture in Europe in the following way:

[W]hen land was considered as the means, not of subsistence merely, but of power and protection, it was thought better that it should descend undivided to one. In those disorderly times, every great landlord was a sort of petty prince. His tenants were his subjects. He was their judge, and in some respects their legislator in peace and their leader in war. He made war according to his own discretion, frequently against his neighbours, and sometimes against his sovereign. The security of a landed estate, therefore, the protection which its owner could afford to those who dwelt on it, depended upon its greatness. To divide it was to ruin it, and to expose every part of it to be oppressed and swallowed up by the incursions of its neighbours. The law of primogeniture, therefore, came to take place, not immediately indeed, but in process of time, in the succession of landed estates, for the same reason that it has generally taken place in that of monarchies, though not always at their first institution.

=== Salic law ===
Also known as agnatic primogeniture, is a system that excludes any female from inheritance of a monarch's principal possessions. Generally known in western Europe as an application of the "Salic law". This rule developed among successions in France in the later Middle Ages. In 1316, Joan, the only surviving child of Louis X of France, was debarred from the throne in favor of her uncle, Philip, Count of Poitiers. After this it was declared that women could not inherit the French throne. Then in 1328, after the death of Charles IV, his paternal cousin, Philip, Count of Valois, became king, notwithstanding the claims of Edward III of England. By proximity of blood, Edward was closest related as eldest son of the sister of Charles, Isabella. The assemblies of the French barons and prelates and the University of Paris resolved that males who derive their right to inheritance through their mother should be excluded. This ruling became a key point of contention in the subsequent Hundred Years War. Over the following century, French jurists adopted a clause from the 6th century Pactus Legis Salicae, which asserted that no female or her descendants could inherit the throne, as a governing rule for the French succession. Although Salic law excludes female lines, it also mandates partible inheritance, rather than primogeniture. This rule developed among successions in France in the later Middle Ages.

In the lands of Napoleon Bonaparte's conquests, Salic law was adopted, including the French Empire and its satellites the Kingdom of Westphalia and the Kingdom of Holland. Other states adopted Salic primogeniture as well, including Belgium, Sweden, Denmark (in 1853) and all of the eastern European monarchies except Greece, i.e. Albania, Bulgaria, Montenegro, Romania, and Serbia. During this era, Spain (in the Carlist conflicts) fought a civil war which pitted the Salic and female-line heirs of the ruling dynasty against one another for possession of the crown.

==== British titles of nobility ====
Many English nobility descend by Salic, male primogeniture have a greater average rate of extinction. For many other titles, if the male line ceases to exist, the title automatically passes to the closest elder sister and her descendants. It could sometimes also pass through a line of descendants to the last holder, as abeyant holders, until they become parents or ancestors to a male descendant who is first born to 'settle the abeyance'. Some senior agnatic cadets are granted from the outset courtesy or subsidiary titles. Notable English exceptions are the Duchy of Lancaster, which is merged with the British Crown which has included women in inheritance since the 16th century, and the Dukedom of Marlborough, which has done so since its establishment in 1702.

However, in Scotland, Salic law has never been practised, and all the hereditary titles are inherited through male-preference primogeniture, where in the extinction of a male line, the eldest sister automatically receives the titles, and rules in her own right, not in the right of her son. A famous example of this is Marjorie, Countess of Carrick, mother of Robert the Bruce, who was the Countess of Carrick in her own right.

=== Quasi-Salic law ===
During the High Medieval period, there arose a trend where the extinction of agnatic lineages forced the consideration of women's claims; nevertheless, the desire for a male heir saw the women themselves excluded from the succession in favor of their sons, so that women could transmit claims but not inherit themselves. Such an agnatic-cognatic primogeniture was called "quasi-Salic". In 1317, to illegitimize Joan II of Navarre's claim on France, Philip V of France declared "women do not succeed to the throne of France". In 1328, Philip's successor, Charles IV of France, also died sonless; Charles' sister, Isabella of France, claimed the throne not for herself, but through her to her son, Edward. However, Philip VI of France took the throne and added another rule to illegitimize Edward, that being nemo dat quod non habet – one cannot transmit a right that one does not possess.

A variation of this form of primogeniture allowed the sons of female dynasts to inherit, but not women themselves, an example being the Francoist succession to the throne of Spain that was applied in 1947–1978.

=== Historical examples ===
A case of agnatic primogeniture is exemplified in the French royal milieu, where the Salic Law (attributed to the Salian Franks) forbade any inheritance of a crown through the female line. This rule was adopted to solve the dispute over the legitimate successor of John I of France, the short-lived son of deceased Louis X of France in favour of Philip V of France (brother of Louis and uncle of John) over Joan II of Navarre (daughter of Louis and sister of John), the Estates-General of 1317 ruling that "Women do not succeed the kingdom of France". In 1328 it was further elaborated to solve the dispute over the legitimate successor of Philip V's brother, Charles IV of France, in favour of Philip VI of France (the son of Charles' uncle Charles of Valois) over Edward III of England (the son of Charles' sister Isabella). While Edward had a stronger claim by proximity of blood, the court ruled "Women cannot transmit a right which they do not possess", reinforcing agnatic primogeniture. This dispute was among the factors behind the Hundred Years' War, which broke out in 1337.

Conflict between the Salic law and the male-preferred system was also the genesis of Carlism in Spain and Miguelism in Portugal.

The crowns of Hanover and Great Britain, which had been in personal union since 1714, were separated in 1837 upon the death of King William IV: his niece Victoria inherited the British crown under male-preference primogeniture but, because of semi-Salic law, was not the heir to that of Hanover, which passed to William's eldest surviving brother, Ernest Augustus, King of Hanover.

The divergence in the late 19th century of the thrones of Luxembourg and the Netherlands, both subject to semi-Salic law, resulted from the fact that the Luxembourg line of succession went back more generations than did the Dutch line. The Luxembourg succession was set by the Nassau House Treaty of 1783, which declared each prince of the House of Nassau to be a potential heir to the territories of every branch of the dynasty. Insofar as the succession is concerned, the Grand Duchy of Luxembourg is the successor state to the Principality of (Orange-)Nassau-Dietz, which was given in exchange to William VI of Nassau, Prince of Orange, in 1813. Succession to the new Kingdom of the Netherlands was recognised by the Congress of Vienna in 1815 as belonging exclusively to the descendants of Prince William VI, who became King William I of the Netherlands. In 1890, William I's agnatic line of male descendants died out, leaving the Netherlands to his female descendant Queen Wilhelmina, whereas Luxembourg still had an agnatic heir from a distant branch of the dynasty left to succeed; ex-Duke Adolf of Nassau, who became reigning Grand Duke, thus ending the personal union of the Netherlands and Luxembourg.

Since the Middle Ages, the agnatic-cognatic or semi/quasi-Salic primogeniture was prevalent for the inheritance of feudal land in German kingdoms in or near the Holy Roman Empire: inheritance was allowed through females when the male line expired. Females themselves did not inherit, but their male issue could. For example, a grandfather without sons was succeeded by his grandson, the son of his daughter, although the daughter still lived. Likewise, an uncle without sons of his own was succeeded by his nephew, a son of his sister, even if the sister still lived.

Common in feudal Europe outside of Germany was land inheritance based on male-preference primogeniture: A lord was succeeded by his eldest son but, failing sons, either by daughters or sons of daughters. In most medieval Western European feudal fiefs, females (such as daughters and sisters) were allowed to succeed, brothers failing. But usually the husband of the heiress became the real lord, ruling in right of his wife (jure uxoris), though on her death the title would not remain with him but pass to her heir.

In more politicized medieval cases, the sometimes conflicting principles of proximity of blood and primogeniture competed against one another. Inheritance matters were decided not based on consistent principles but expedient outcomes. Proximity meant that an heir closer in degree of kinship to the lord in question was given precedence although that heir was not necessarily the heir by primogeniture.

- The Burgundian succession in 1361 was resolved in favor of King John II, son of a younger daughter, on basis of blood proximity, being a nearer cousin of the dead duke than Charles II of Navarre, grandson of the elder daughter and son of Jeanne. John was only one generation of consanguinity removed from the late duke instead of two for Charles.
- In dispute over the Scottish succession, 1290–1292, the Bruce family pleaded tanistry and proximity of blood, whereas Balliol argued his claim based on primogeniture. The arbiter, Edward I of England, decided in favor of primogeniture. But later, the Independence Wars reverted the situation in favor of the Bruce, due to political exigency.
- The Earldom of Gloucester (in the beginning of 14th century) went to full sisters of the dead earl, not to his half-sisters, though they were elder, having been born of the father's first marriage, while the earl himself was from second marriage. Full siblings were considered higher in proximity than half-siblings.

However, primogeniture increasingly won legal cases over proximity in later centuries.

Later, when lands were strictly divided among noble families and tended to remain fixed, agnatic primogeniture (the same as Salic Law) became usual: succession going to the eldest son of the monarch; if the monarch had no sons, the throne would pass to the nearest male relative in the male line.

Some countries, however, accepted female rulers early on, so that if the monarch had no sons, the throne would pass to the eldest daughter, or in a few cases, the next closest female relative. Examples of ruling queens in antiquity include Hatshepsut and Cleopatra, pharaohs of Egypt, Zenobia, Empress of Palmyra, Shammuramat of the Assyrian empire, as well as Boudica, queen of Iceni, and Cartimandua, queen of Brigantes, both tribes in Britain.

A few prominent examples of reigning queens in medieval and early modern periods include Irene of Athens, Didda of Kashmir, Razia Sultana of the Delhi Sultanate, Margaret, Maid of Norway who was the queen of Scotland, Margaret I of the Kalmar Union, Isabella I of Castile and her daughter Joanna of Castile, Mary, Queen of Scots, Mary I of England and her sister Elizabeth I of England, Jeanne III of Navarre as well as Christina, Queen of Sweden.

A few examples from the early modern times include Queen Anne, Queen Victoria, Maria Theresa of the Habsburg monarchy, and Catherine the Great of Russia. A few examples from the current century include Elizabeth II of the United Kingdom, Margrethe II of Denmark and Beatrix of the Netherlands.

In England all land passed to any widow strictly for life, then by primogeniture. Until the Statute of Wills was passed in 1540, a will could control only personal property. Real estate (land) passed to the eldest male descendant by operation of law. The statute gave power to landowners to "devise" land by the use of a new device, part of any will, including heading "testament". The default setting of such primogeniture applying absent express written words in England was not changed until the Administration of Estates Act 1925. In law, primogeniture is the rule of inheritance whereby land descends to the oldest son. Under the feudal system of medieval Europe, primogeniture generally governed the inheritance of land held in military tenure (see knight). The effect of this rule was to keep the father's land for the support of the son who rendered the required military service. When feudalism declined and the payment of a tax was substituted for military service, the need for primogeniture disappeared. In England the 1540 Act permitted the oldest son to be entirely cut off from inheriting, and in the 17th century military tenure was abolished; primogeniture is, nevertheless, a fading custom of the gentry and farm owners in England and Wales.

An ancient and alternative way in which women succeeded to power, especially without displacing the direct male line descendants of the first monarchs, was consortium or coregency between husband and wife or other relatives. The most notable are the Egyptian cases of Hatshepsut and Thutmose III, and the monarchs of the Ptolemaic Dynasty.

==== United States and Canada ====
In British North America, the colonies followed English primogeniture laws. Carole Shammas argues that issues of primogeniture, dower, curtesy, strict family settlements in equity, collateral kin, and unilateral division of real and personal property were fully developed in the colonial courts. The Americans differed little from English policies regarding the status of widow, widower, and lineal descendants. The primogeniture laws were repealed at the time of the American Revolution. Thomas Jefferson took the lead in repealing the law in Virginia, where nearly three-fourths of Tidewater land and perhaps a majority of western lands were entailed. Canada had the same law but repealed it in 1851.

When Winston Churchill and Franklin D. Roosevelt met at Placentia Bay in August 1941, Roosevelt said he could not understand the British aristocracy's concept of primogeniture, and he intended to divide his estate equally between his five children; Churchill explained that an equal distribution was nicknamed the Spanish Curse by the British upper classes: "We give everything to the eldest and the others strive to duplicate it and found empires. While the oldest, having it all, marries for beauty. Which accounts, Mr President, for my good looks". But as Churchill's father was a younger son, there may have been more modesty than mock-vanity than Roosevelt realised.

== Reform of noble title primogeniture ==
=== Spain ===
In 2006, King Juan Carlos I of Spain decreed a reform of the succession to noble titles from male-preference primogeniture to absolute primogeniture.

The order of succession for all noble dignities is determined in accordance with the title of concession and, if there is none, with that traditionally applied in these cases. When the order of succession to the title is not specified in the nobility title creation charter, the following rules apply:

- Absolute preference is given to the direct descending line over the collateral and ascending line, and, within the same line, the closest degree takes precedence over the more remote and, within the same degree, the elder over the younger, combined with the principles of firstborn and representation.
- Men and women have an equal right of succession to grandeeship and to titles of nobility in Spain, and no person may be given preference in the normal order of succession for reasons of gender.

=== United Kingdom ===
A bill to reform hereditary peerage inheritance law was tabled in 2013 for absolute primogeniture. The Equality (Titles) Bill was socially dubbed the "Downton law/bill" in reference to the British television drama Downton Abbey, in which the Earl's eldest daughter cannot inherit her father's estate as entrusted, unless all of the adult beneficiaries amend the trust (a legal position established in the 1841 case Saunders v Vautier). A Lords' Committee was chosen for Committee Stage, which rejected it.

== See also ==
- Order of succession
- List of monarchies by order of succession
- Contrasting systems of succession:
  - Proximity of blood
  - Agnatic seniority, Rota system and Tanistry
  - Elective monarchy
- Issue (genealogy)
- Majorat
- Royal bastard
