= Sikandar Begum =

Nawab of Bhopal from 1860 to 1868

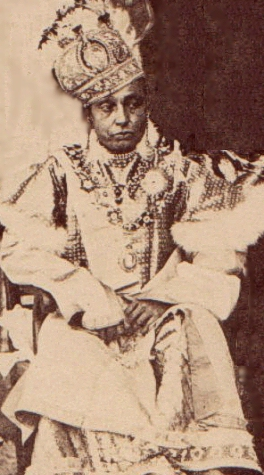

Nawab of Bhopal
- Reign: 30 September 1860 – 30 October 1868
- Predecessor: Shah Jahan Begum (first reign)
- Successor: Shah Jahan Begum (second reign)

Regent of Bhopal
- Regency: 1844–1860
- Monarch: Shah Jahan Begum
- Born: Sikandar Begum; 10 September 1817; Gauhar Mahal, Bhopal State, British India (present-day Madhya Pradesh, India)
- Died: 30 October 1868 (aged 51); Moti Mahal, Bhopal State, British India (present-day Madhya Pradesh, India)
- Burial: Farhat Afza Bagh, Bhopal
- spouse: Jahangir Mohammad Khan
- Issue: Shah Jahan Begum
- Father: Nasir Mohammad Khan
- Mother: Qudsia Begum, Begum of Bhopal
- Religion: Islam

Sikander Begum GCSI (10 September 1817 – 30 October 1868) was the Nawab of Bhopal from 1860 until her death in 1868. Although she was initially appointed regent of her nine-year old daughter Shah Jahan Begum in 1844, she was recognized as nawab in 1860. During the 1857 Sepoy Mutiny, Sikandar's pro-British stance made her a Knight Grand Commander. In 1863, she was the first Indian ruler to perform Hajj. Sikandar enacted many reforms in the state, including the creation of a mint, a secretariat, a parliament and a modern judiciary.

== Early life ==
Sikandar was born at Gauhar Mahal in Bhopal State, British India, on 10 September 1817. Her parents, Nasir Muhammad Khan and Qudsia Begum, Begum of Bhopal, were former nawabs of the state.

== Reign ==
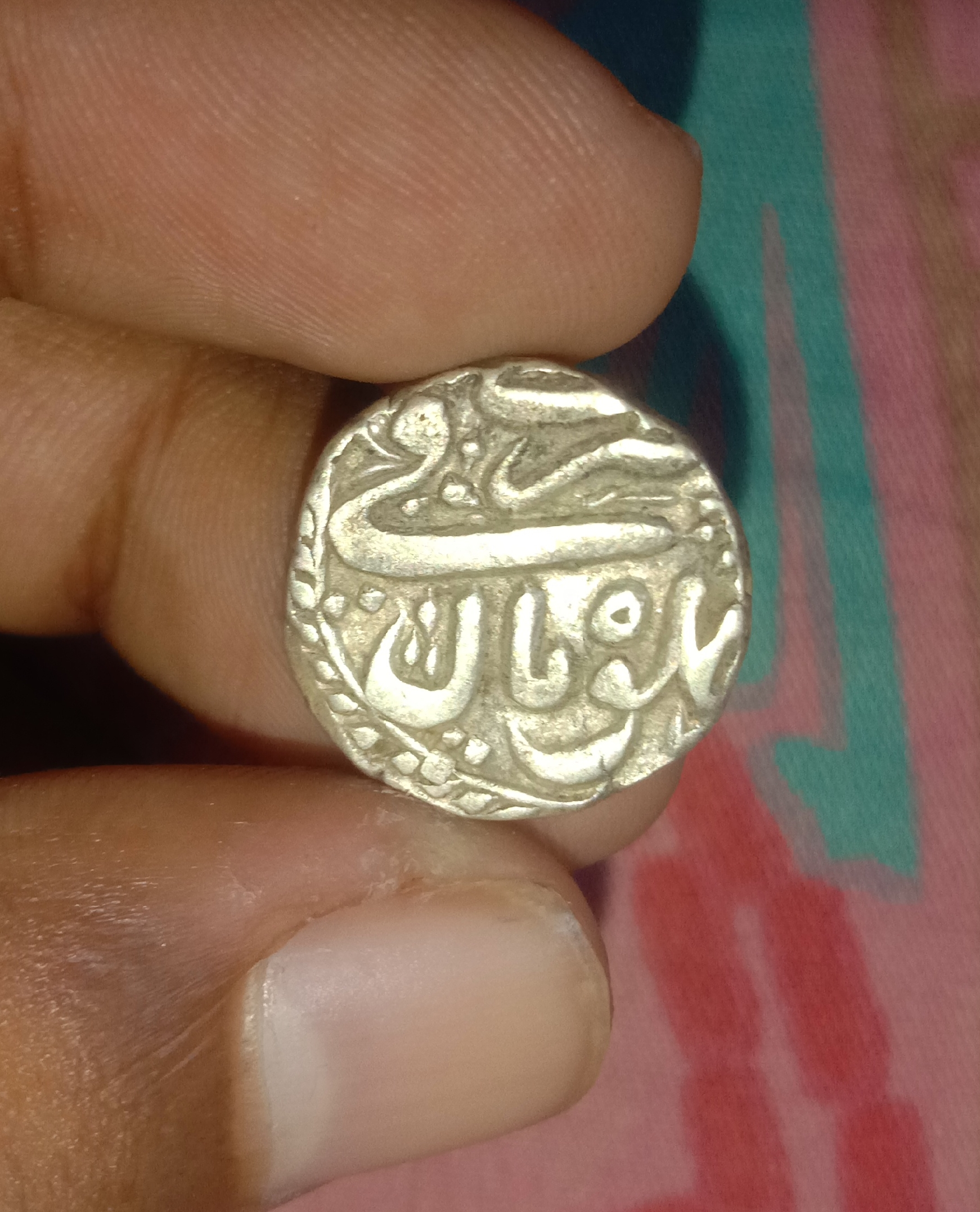
Silver Rupee coin from the princely state of Bhopal, struck in the name of Nawab Sikander Begum.

On 3 January 1847, Sikandar Begum's nine-year old daughter Shah Jahan Begum ascended the throne of Bhopal. Joseph Davey Cunningham, political agent of the Governor-General of India, announced on 27 July of that year that Sikandar was appointed regent. The governor-general bestowed the state's executive powers on her.

During the 1857 Sepoy Mutiny, Sikandar sided with the British. To prevent rebellion in Bhopal, she banned the publication and circulation of anti-British pamphlets, strengthened her intelligence network, and bribed anti-British soldiers to switch sides. In August, however, a group of sepoys attacked British garrisons in Sehore and Berasia; anger with her increased in the state due to her pro-British stance. The same group of sepoys, encouraged by Sikandar's mother, surrounded her palace in December. Sikandar sent her son-in-law, Umrao Daulah, to negotiate with them. The soldiers ended their siege when she announced that their salaries would be increased. In 1861, Sikandar received the Knight Grand Commander award for her pro-British stance during the mutiny. The British recognized Sikandar as Nawab of Bhopal on 30 September 1860, and her military salute was increased to 19 guns the following year.

=== Hajj ===
In 1863, Sikandar was the first Indian monarch to perform Hajj. She was accompanied by about 1,000 people, mostly women. Sikandar wrote a memoir of her trip in Urdu, and an English translation was published in 1870. In the memoir, she wrote that the cities of Mecca and Jeddah were "unclean" and the Arabs and the Turks were "uncivilised" and "possessed no religious knowledge." Also included in the memoir is an anecdote about her confrontation with Turkish customs officials who wanted to levy duties on everything she brought.

=== Reforms ===
Sikandar divided the state into three districts and 21 sub-districts. A revenue officer was appointed for each district and an administrator for each sub-district. She repaid the state's ₹3 million (US$31,000) debt. Sikandar also established a customs office, a secretariat, an intelligence network, a mint, a postal service which connected the state with the rest of India, and a modern judiciary with a court of appeal.

She founded the Victoria School for girls and at least one Urdu and Hindi middle school in each district of the state. Sikandar introduced a Majlis-e-Shoora (parliament) in 1847. Consisting of nobles and intellectuals, its purpose was to pass and recommend laws and to suggest reforms. In 1862, she replaced Persian with Urdu as the court language.

=== Architecture ===
Sikandar constructed a Moti Masjid (mosque) made of red sandstone, and built the Moti Mahal and Shaukat Mahal palaces. The latter was a blend of European and Indo-Islamic architecture, with Gothic features.

== Personal life ==
On 18 April 1835, Sikandar married Nawab Jahangir Mohammad Khan. They had one daughter, Shah Jahan Begum. Like her mother, Qudsia Begum, Sikandar was a devout Muslim; however, she did not wear the niqab (face veil) or practise purdah (female seclusion). She hunted tigers, played polo and was a swordsman, archer, and lancer. Sikandar commanded the army, and personally inspected courts, offices, the mint, and the treasury.

Sikandar Begum died of kidney failure on 30 October 1868. She was buried at Farhat Afza Bagh, and was succeeded by her daughter as Nawab of Bhopal.
