= Moti Masjid, Bhopal =

Mosque in Bhopal, Madhya Pradesh, India

Moti Masjid
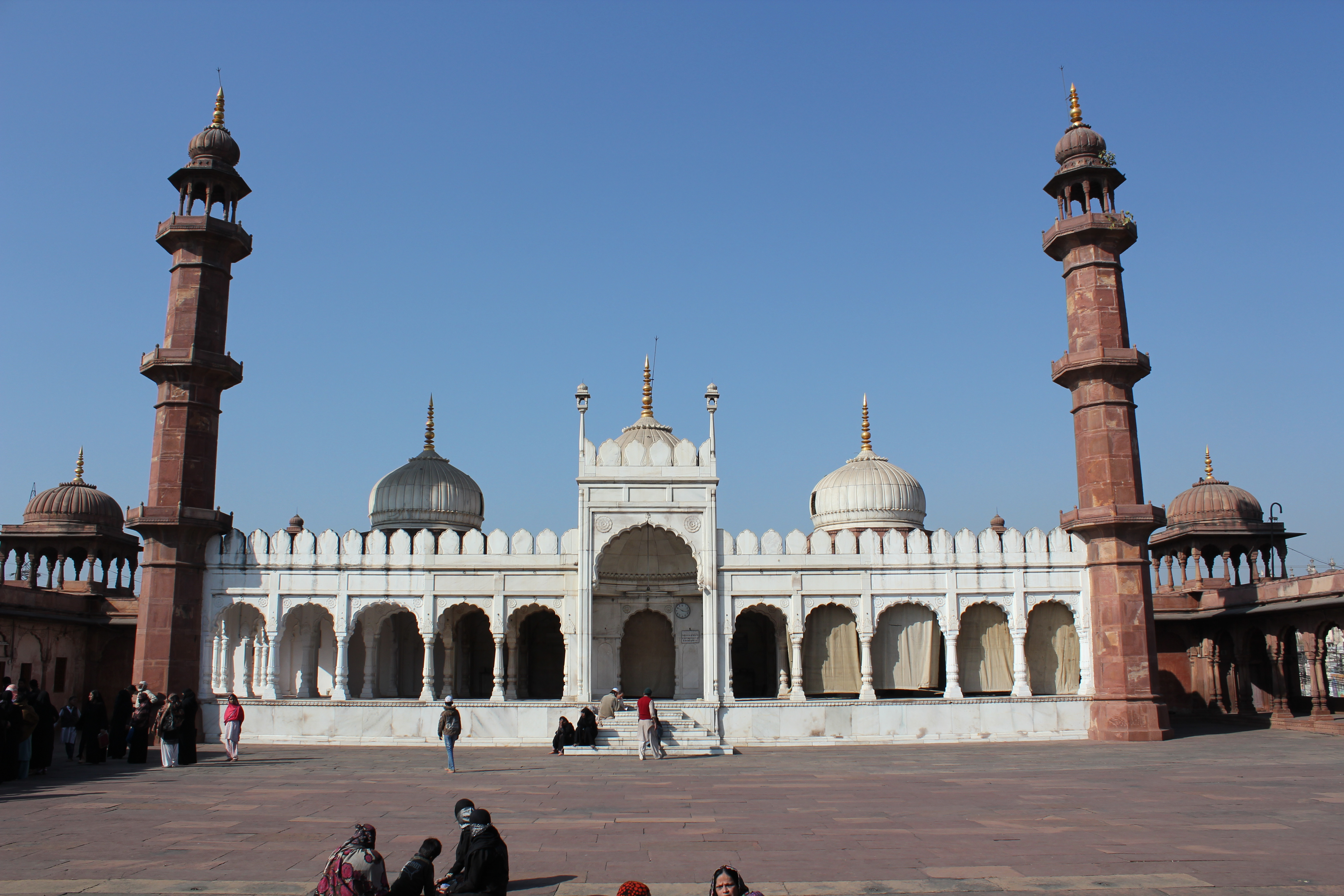
- The mosque façade, in 2012

- Location of the mosque in Madhya Pradesh

Religion
- Affiliation: Islam
- Ecclesiastical or organizational status: Mosque
- Status: Active

Location
- Location: Bhopal, Bhopal district, Madhya Pradesh
- Country: India
- Interactive map of Moti Masjid
- Coordinates: 23°15′20″N 77°23′56″E

Architecture
- Type: Mosque architecture
- Style: Indo-Islamic
- Founder: Sikandar Jahan
- Completed: 1860

Specifications
- Dome: Three (maybe more)
- Minaret: Two
- Materials: Red sandstone; white marble

The Moti Masjid is a mosque located in Bhopal, in the state of Madhya Pradesh, India. The mosque was commissioned by Sikandar Jahan and was completed in 1860. A replica of the Jama Masjid of Delhi, red sandstone and white marble were used in its construction.

== Gallery ==
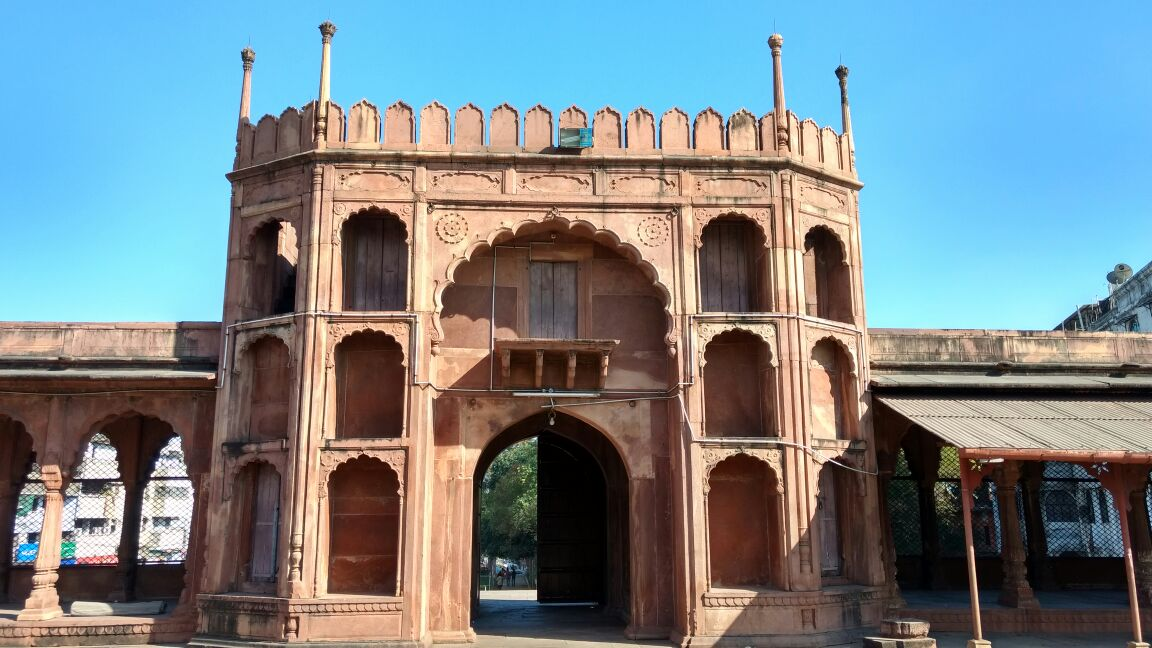
Eastern gateway

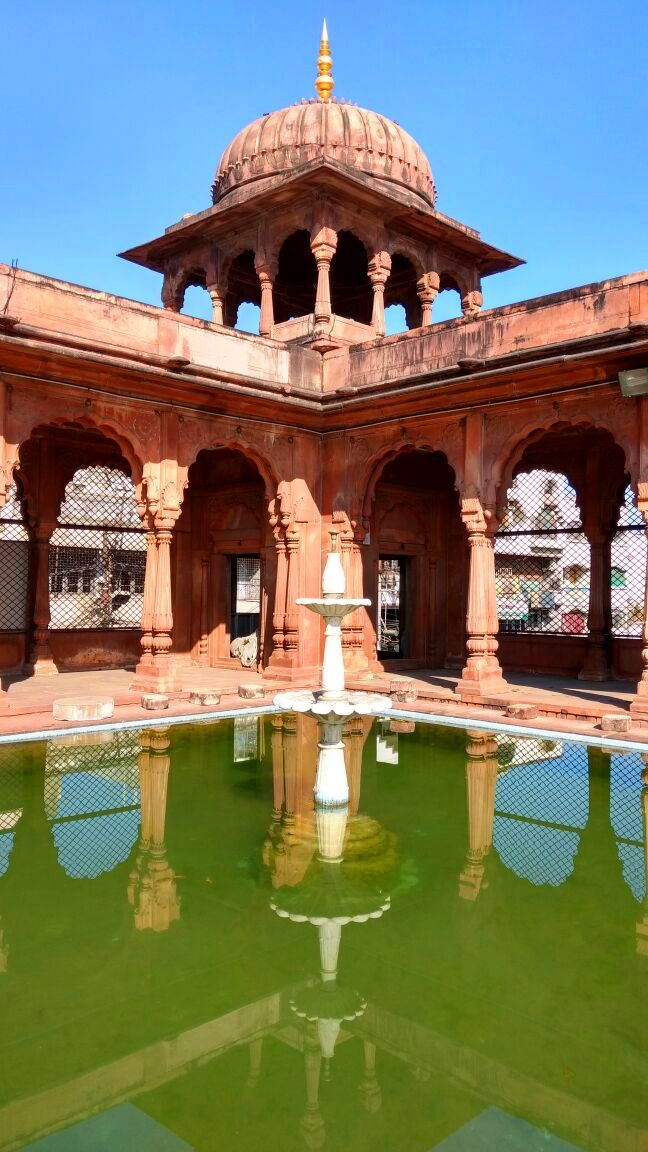
Courtyard fountain in 2016

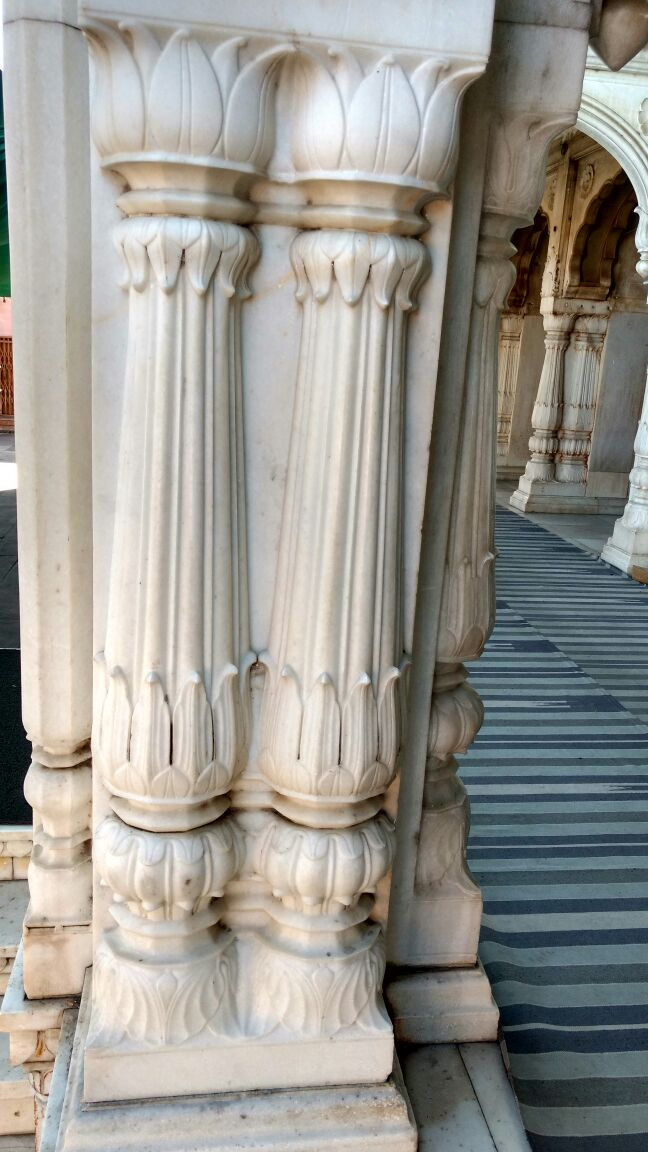
Marble pillars inside the mosque

== See also ==
- Islam in India
- List of mosques in India
