= Agnatic seniority =

Succession in which a king's brothers inherit over sons

Agnatic seniority diagram. Legend: Grey: incumbent; Square: male; Black: deceased; Diagonal: cannot be displaced

Agnatic seniority is a patrilineal principle of inheritance where the order of succession to the throne prefers the monarch's younger brother over the monarch's own sons. A monarch's children (the next generation) succeed only after the males of the elder generation have all been exhausted. Agnatic seniority excludes females of the dynasty and their descendants from the succession. Contrast agnatic primogeniture, where the king's sons stand higher in succession than his brothers.

== Description ==
In hereditary monarchies, particularly in more ancient times, seniority was a much-used principle of order of succession. The Ottoman Empire evolved from an elective succession (following the principle of agnatic seniority) to a succession inherited by the law of agnatic seniority.

In succession based on rotation (close to seniority), all (male) members of the dynasty were entitled to the monarchy, in principle. However, this tends to lead to situations where there is no clear rule to determine who is the next monarch.

Brothers succeeding each other as a system leads quickly, particularly in the following generations, to complex patterns and also to disputes between branches which have formed within the monarchical house.

Monarchs had collateral relatives, some of whom were rather distant cousins, who were often as entitled to succeed as the monarch himself. Either one branch obtained sufficient control over others (often by force), the rival branches arrived at a balance (such as the succession becoming rotational), or the inheritance was somehow partitioned.

Succession based on agnatic seniority or rotation was often limited to those princes who were sons of an earlier reigning monarch. Thus, a son of a king had a higher claim than a son of a prince. In some cases, distinctions were even made based on whether the claimant was born to a monarch who reigned at the time of birth (porphyrogeniture).

This limit was practical, as otherwise the number of rivals would be overwhelming. However, it usually left multiple rivals who too often waged civil war against each other. In other cases, the eligible branches of dynasty became extinct in the male line (no surviving sons), in which situation the limit was problematic.

Sons of princes who did not live long enough to succeed to the throne were unsatisfied with such limits. This led to interpretation problems: What if a claimant's father was a rightful monarch, but not recognized by everyone, or by no one (did not rule at all)? The cases were further complicated by co-reigning monarchs, but this was often a practical solution to a controversial succession.

Agnatic seniority tends in the long run to favor a sort of ultimogeniture, because princes born in a certain generation to the most junior lines tend to be more likely alive at the demise of the predecessor (the last of the immediately preceding generation). In a situation where representatives from any later generation are not allowed to succeed until the last ones of the earlier generation die, plenty of dynasts, usually from more senior branches, will die before their turn on the throne. This tendency is one of the causes of disputed successions: some desire to succeed before they die, and plead the seniority or better blood of their branch. This is further exacerbated if a dynast is not allowed to succeed in case his father was not regnant (or is regarded just as a spare, eligible to succeed only after all those males whose fathers were regnant)—senior branches will with high likelihood sooner or later lose their places in succession. Agnatic seniority tends to favor boys who are born to fathers in their old age.

Succession within one family based on seniority was often a device to control an elective monarchy. Those two forms of monarchy (agnatic seniority and elective monarchy) were mostly used in the same centuries. Many kingdoms were officially elective long into historical times (though the election usually, or always, fell to family of the deceased monarch).

The preference for males which exists in most systems of hereditary succession came mostly from the perceived nature of the role of the monarch:

- Tribal chiefs (proto-monarchs) were required to personally participate in violent activities such as war, duels, and raiding expeditions.
- His income was dependent on the "protection money" or corvee labor collected from those people he was supposed to protect from violence, both from outside (war) and from within (crime). The collection of these funds or services often required the threat or actual use of force by the monarch, but more politely labeled "taxes" and "duties". These forms of revenue-collecting are also present in non-monarchical systems.
- It was very useful, or even required, that the monarch be a warrior and a military commander. Warriors (almost always males) often would only accept other males as their commanders.
- Additionally, in some monarchies, the monarch held a certain mystical, almost priestly, position. That role, depending on the tradition in question, was often denied to females. In the French monarchy, one of the official explanations for the Salic Law was that the monarch was obliged to use certain sacred instruments, which females were forbidden even to touch.

In earlier centuries, perhaps in every second or every third generation on average, the male line often became extinct and females were needed to trace the line of succession. During this period, male lines tended to become extinct relatively quickly, usually due to violent death. Therefore, "pure" agnatic succession was impossible to maintain, and frequent exceptions were made—eligibility being granted to the eldest sons of sisters or other female relatives of the monarch.

The fully agnatic succession also did not serve the interests of individual monarchs who favored close female relatives and their descendants over very distant male relatives.

In the later Middle Ages, violence directly involving the monarch and his heirs became less of a factor, as they gradually decreased their personal participation in combat. Sons were much more likely to survive to adulthood and to marry than in previous centuries, when many noble families lost adolescent sons to constant warfare. In addition, the living conditions and nutrition of the nobility improved, leading to fewer miscarriages and decreased infant and childhood mortality. Daughters were therefore needed less and less to trace succession.

In many cultures, surnames are agnatically determined.

== Historical examples ==
Agnatic seniority has been used in several historical monarchies.

=== Angevin Empire ===
The County of Anjou followed inheritance by agnatic seniority. When Henry II of England married Eleanor of Aquitaine, creating the Angevin Empire, this resulted in some question over what inheritance laws would affect their children, as Henry II's father was the count of Anjou, and he inherited England and Normandy through his mother. Henry II's eldest son, the Young Henry, died before him, so the throne passed to his next oldest son, Richard I of England. Henry II's third son, Geoffrey II, Duke of Brittany died three years before his father, but his pregnant wife later gave birth to a son, Arthur of Brittany. When Richard was mortally wounded during a castle siege, on his deathbed he named his brother John, Henry II's fourth and youngest son, as his heir. However, the inheritance was questioned by the young Arthur of Brittany (then 12 years old). Arthur argued that as the son of John's older brother Geoffrey, he was the rightful heir of Richard and Henry II according to the laws of agnatic primogeniture which were followed in England and Normandy. John countered that as the male-line heirs of the Counts of Anjou, the Angevin Empire followed the succession law of Anjou which was based on agnatic seniority. Thus, John claimed that as Richard's younger brother, he stood in line ahead of his nephew. Arthur continued to press his claim for the next four years, allying with the king of France against John, though Richard's deathbed declaration of John as his heir provided greater strength to his claim. Ultimately, Arthur was captured in battle, imprisoned, and presumably killed by John. The matter was never definitively decided, as John lost all continental land possessions in France and had to relinquish any claim to rule of Anjou.

=== Chinese Empire ===
It was practiced by the Shang dynasty and the enfeoffed Shang survivors who ruled the State of Song under the Zhou dynasty in China.

=== Czech lands ===
In Moravia and Bohemia since 1055 to 1182 respective 1203, established by duke Bretislaus I in his seniority "constitution".

=== Ethiopian Empire ===
In the succession for the Emperor of Ethiopia, limitation to agnates was controlled until recent times. According to research by the historian Taddesse Tamrat, the order of succession during the Zagwe dynasty was that of brother succeeding brother as King of Ethiopia (i.e., agnatic seniority), which apparently was based on Agaw laws of inheritance. However, the principle of agnatic primogeniture later became dominant, although succession to the throne at the death of the monarch could be claimed by any male blood relative of the Emperor—sons, brothers, uncles or cousins. To avoid instability and civil war, an Emperor typically took care to designate his chosen heir, and to strengthen the heir's position against rivals. In addition, the Emperor would place the heir's rivals in a secure location, which drastically limited their ability to disrupt the Empire with revolts, or to dispute the succession of an heir apparent. Over time, Emperors were more frequently selected by a council of the senior officials of the realm, both secular and religious. The Ethiopian experience is a particularly good example of the instability which can result from the application of the principle of agnatic seniority.

=== Kievan Rus' ===
In Kievan Rus' during the Rurik dynasty, a variant of agnatic seniority known as the rota system gradually evolved over the course of several generations. According to Janet Martin (1995), each new generation of princes fought wars of succession or princely rebellions, resulting in the establishment of a new rule that the next generation accepted. By the end of the 11th century, there was a comprehensive succession system that almost every member of the Rurikid house respected. While some scholars have supposed that Yaroslav the Wise invented the system all on his own, Martin rejected this idea in favour of every generation contributing a new rule.

=== Morocco ===
It was sometimes used in Morocco by the Alaouite dynasty until it was definitely abolished by King Mohammed V (1957–1961) who introduced agnatic primogeniture.

=== Piast Poland ===
In the Piast Kingdom of Poland, the Testament of Bolesław III Wrymouth enacted in 1138 with the establishment of a Seniorate Province at Kraków led to a centuries-long period of fragmentation of the country among his descendants.

=== Saudi Arabia ===
The principle is currently used by the House of Saud, the royal family of Saudi Arabia; so far, all successors to Ibn Saud as King of Saudi Arabia have been one of his 45 sons. In 2007, however, the Allegiance Council was instituted to facilitate the transition of power to the grandsons of Ibn Saud. The institution of the Allegiance Council arguably makes the succession formally elective, but seniority remains the overriding factor, and it is expected that the most-senior dynast will be elected unless he is uninterested in the throne or otherwise disqualified.

Salman, who became king in January 2015, initially appointed his younger half-brother Muqrin as crown prince, according to agnatic seniority. In April 2015 he replaced Muqrin with his nephew Muhammad bin Nayef; and in 2017 he replaced Muhammad bin Nayef with Mohammed bin Salman, his own son, as the crown prince.

== See also ==
- Line of succession to the Saudi Arabian throne, which followed agnatic seniority in 1918–2017
- Perak, a state in Malaysia whose monarchy follows this principle (see also Sultan of Perak)
- Order of succession
- Primogeniture
- Proximity of blood
- Rota system
- Tanistry

== Bibliography ==
- Martin, Janet (1995). Medieval Russia, 980–1584. Cambridge: Cambridge University Press. p. 450. ISBN 9780521368322.
