= Jure matris =

Latin phrase meaning "by right of his mother"

Jure matris (iure matris) is a Latin phrase meaning "by right of his mother" or "in right of his mother".

It is commonly encountered in the law of inheritance when a noble title or other right passes from mother to son. It is also used in the context of monarchy in cases where a woman holds a title in her own right but grants exercise of the power to her son. In many cultures it was common for the husband of a titled woman to exercise power on her behalf, and sometimes after his death she allowed their son and heir the same privilege during her lifetime.

== Notable jure matris rulers ==
- Baldwin III of Jerusalem was jure matris King of Jerusalem from 1143 to 1153 through his mother Melisende.
- Henry II of England was jure matris King of England from 1154 to 1189 through his mother Empress Matilda.
- Richard the Lionheart and his brother John were jure matris Dukes of Aquitaine from 1189 to 1199 and 1199 to 1204 respectively through their mother Eleanor, who was Duchess of Aquitaine in her own right.
- Charles V, Holy Roman Emperor, was King of Castile through his mother Joanna from 1516 to 1555 (Joanna was actually effectively kept imprisoned for insanity, and powerless).
- Joseph II, Holy Roman Emperor, was Archduke of Austria from 1765 to 1780 through his mother Maria Theresa.

== See also ==
- Jure uxoris
- List of Latin phrases
- List of queens regnant
- Primogeniture
- Suo jure
