= Qudsia Begum, Begum of Bhopal =

Nawab of Bhopal from 1819 to 1837

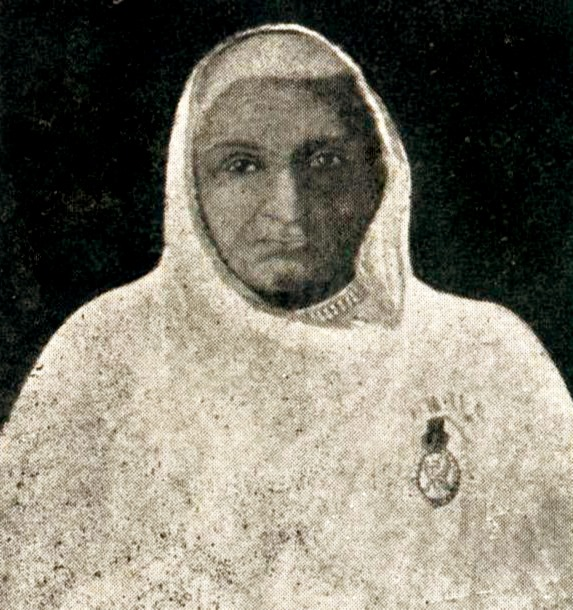
Qudsia Begum, Nawab of Bhopal

Qudsia Begum (1801 – 1881) was the Nawab of Bhopal from 14 November 1819 until her abdication on 29 November 1837.

She was born to nawab Ghous Mohammad Khan of Bhopal. In 1817, she married Nazar Mohammad Khan, and became the mother of Sikandar Begum.

Her husband succeeded her father as Nawab. In 1819, she succeeded her husband as Nawab of Bhopal.

In 1837, she abdicated in favor of her daughter and son-in-law. She continued to influence the affairs of state in Bhopal during the reigns of her son-in-law, her daughter, and her granddaughter.

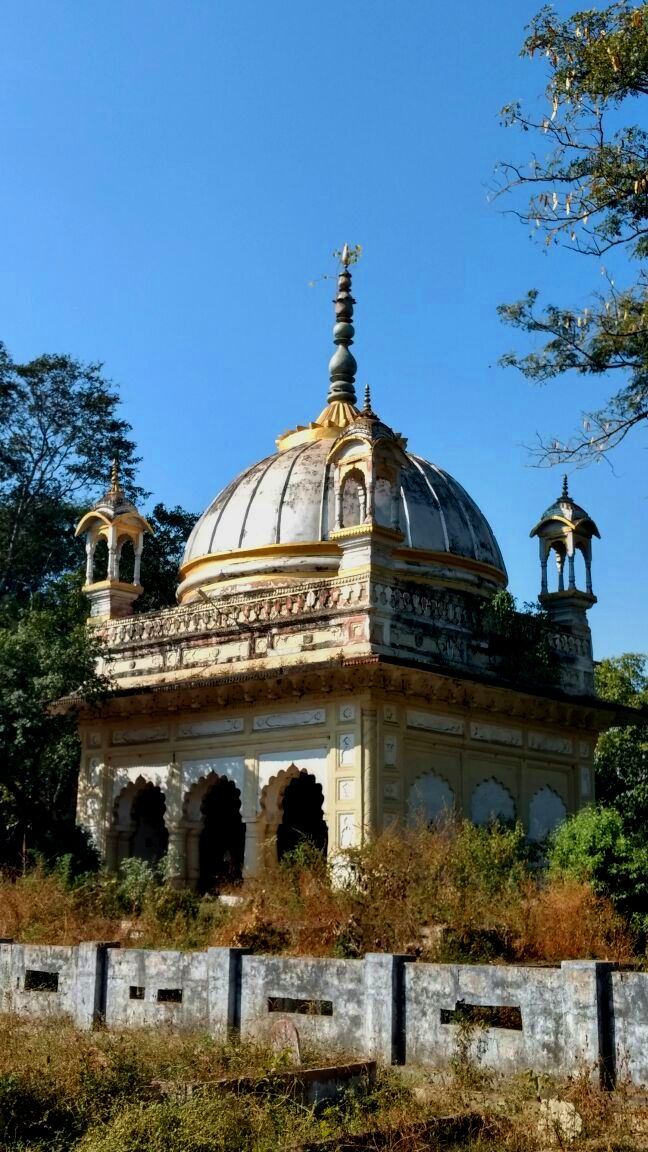
Tomb of Nawab Kudsia Begum
