= Pataudi (disambiguation) =

Pataudi is a town and tehsil in the Indian state of Haryana.

Pataudi may also refer to:

- Pataudi family
  - Iftikhar Ali Khan Pataudi (1910–1952), Indian prince, England and Indian cricketer, father of Mansoor Ali Khan Pataudi
  - Sher Ali Khan Pataudi (1913–2002), major general in Pakistan, brother of Iftikhar Ali Khan Pataudi
  - Mansoor Ali Khan Pataudi (1941–2011), nicknamed Tiger, Indian cricketer, son of Iftikhar Ali Khan Pataudi
    - Mansur Ali Khan Pataudi Memorial Lecture
- Nawab of Pataudi, rulers of the former Pataudi State
- Pataudi Assembly constituency, one of the assembly constituencies of Haryana
- Pataudi State, former princely state centered on Pataudi

== See also ==
- Pataudi massacre, which followed the 1984 assassination of Indira Gandhi
- Pataudi Palace
- Pataudi Road railway station
- Pataudi Trophy, for cricket matches between England and India, named in honour of both cricketers
