= Neemrana Hotels =

Indian hotel chain

- Type: Private
- Industry: Hospitality
- Founded: 1991
- Founder: Aman Nath and Francis Wacziarg
- Headquarters: A20, Feroze Gandhiji Rd, Block A, Lajpat Nagar II, Lajpat Nagar, New Delhi, Delhi 110024, New Delhi, India
- Number of locations: 13
- Area served: India
- Key people: Sonavi Kaicker (CEO)
- Revenue: 50 Cr
- Operating income: 45 Cr
- Net income: 5 Cr
- Owner: Aman Nath, Sonavi Kaicker, Aadya Nath, Priya Wacziarg, Wacziarg Family Trust
- Number of employees: 751
- Website: Official site

The Neemrana Hotels is an Indian organisation, noted for restoring ruins and turning them into heritage hotels.

== History ==
The story of Neemrana begins in 1977 when, while writing a book, Aman Nath and Francis Wacziarg first saw its 15th-century ruins lit up by the setting sun. They were researching for a book on the frescoes: The Painted Walls of Shekhavati. The Neemrana fort on the Aravalli range in Rajasthan seemed captivating.

Aman Nath followed up with the Raja and bought the ruin with two Indian friends in 1986. They bought the fort for Rs 700,000 in 1986 and restored it, opening as a hotel in 1991 with 12 rooms. After restoration, the fort, which was built in 1464 under Chauhan Rulers and had been a ruin for 40 years, open to guests. The hotel has been used as the venue for the International Festival of Indian Literature in 2002, for Mastermind India, conference, events and for dozens of dazzling weddings. But when the two original partners wanted to leave after 6 years and the hotel was running to much applause, Francis Wacziarg stepped in.

Later, the Neemrana Hotels company was established in 1991 by Aman Nath and Francis Wacziarg. Aman Nath was a post-graduate in medieval Indian history from Delhi University, and Francis Wacziarg a former French diplomat who began in Bombay.

== Restoration process ==
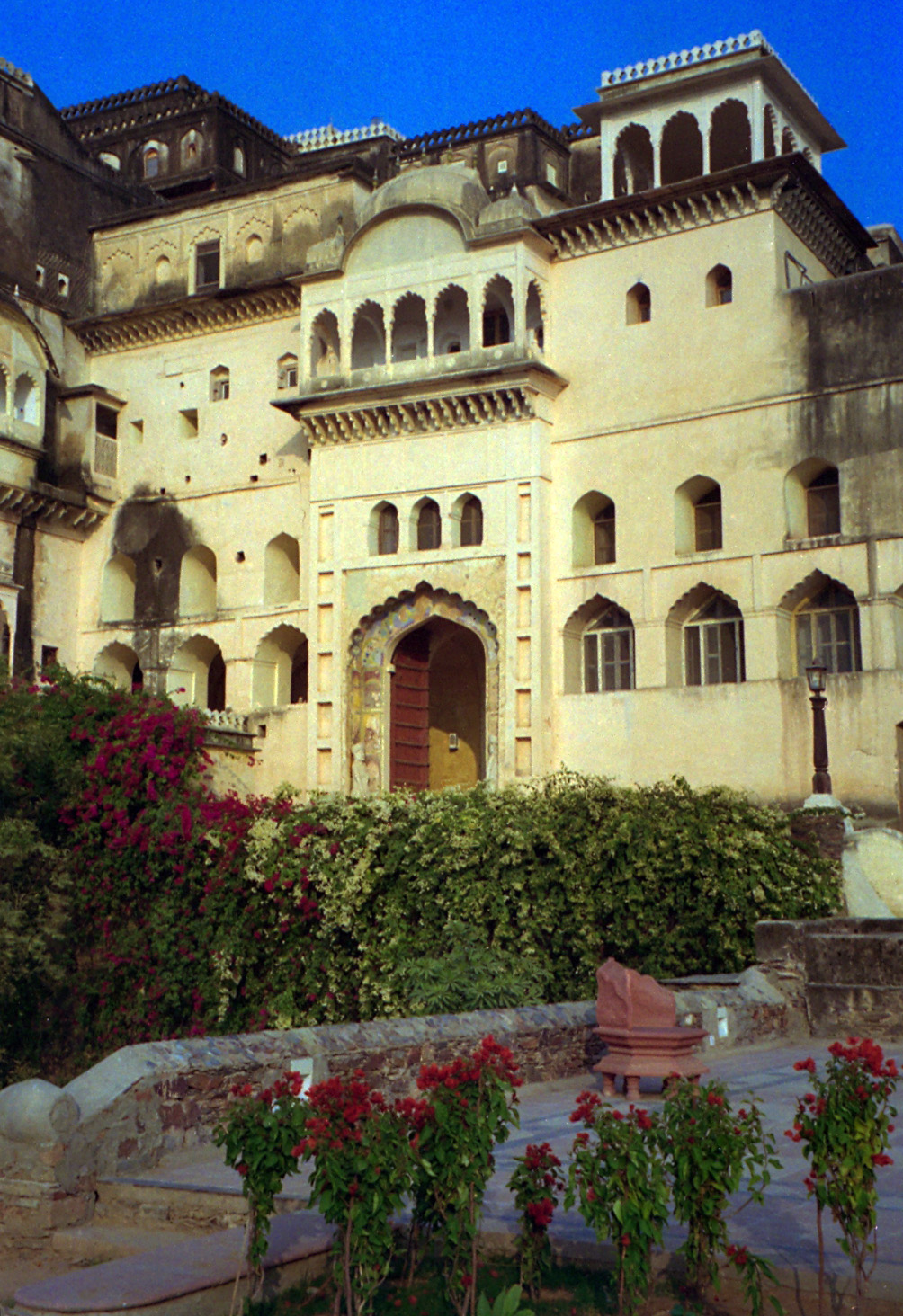
Neemrana Fort Palace hotel, at Neemrana, Alwar district Rajasthan, the first property of Neemrana in Alwar, opened 1991.

The modifications made to the ruins to retain a consistent design include basic amenities like plumbing and air-conditioning hidden from view, and designing 19th-century rooms in the colonial style They call their hotels "non-hotels", to emphasise this design. The buildings are restored in phases, with revenue from guests of restored parts being used to restore the rest. Along with their practice of using local artisans and materials, this keeps costs low, and their hotels break even in two to three years rather than the industry average of seven to eight.

== Heritage properties ==
15th century Neemrana fort was the first property acquired by Neemrana Hotels in 1991 which they gradually restored. Subsequent to their success in restoration of heritage property, the Punjab government transferred the Baradari Palace in Patiala to them as a public-private partnership, and the Rajasthan government leased them the Tijari Fort. Similarly, the Pataudi Palace (of Mansur Ali Khan Pataudi and Sharmila Tagore) was leased to them, and Thakur Mangal Singh leased them the 14th-century Hill Fort Kesroli in Alwar. The Tijari fort at Alwar is not a ruin but a building that had been left unfinished in 1845 because of war; the Neemrana Hotels has undertaken completion. Most of their projects have been initiated by the owners of the buildings approaching them, and they have over 2 potential projects on hand.

In 2025, Neemrana Hotels had 20 properties in 8 States and crossed ₹300 million (US$3.1 million) in revenue.

=== Examples ===
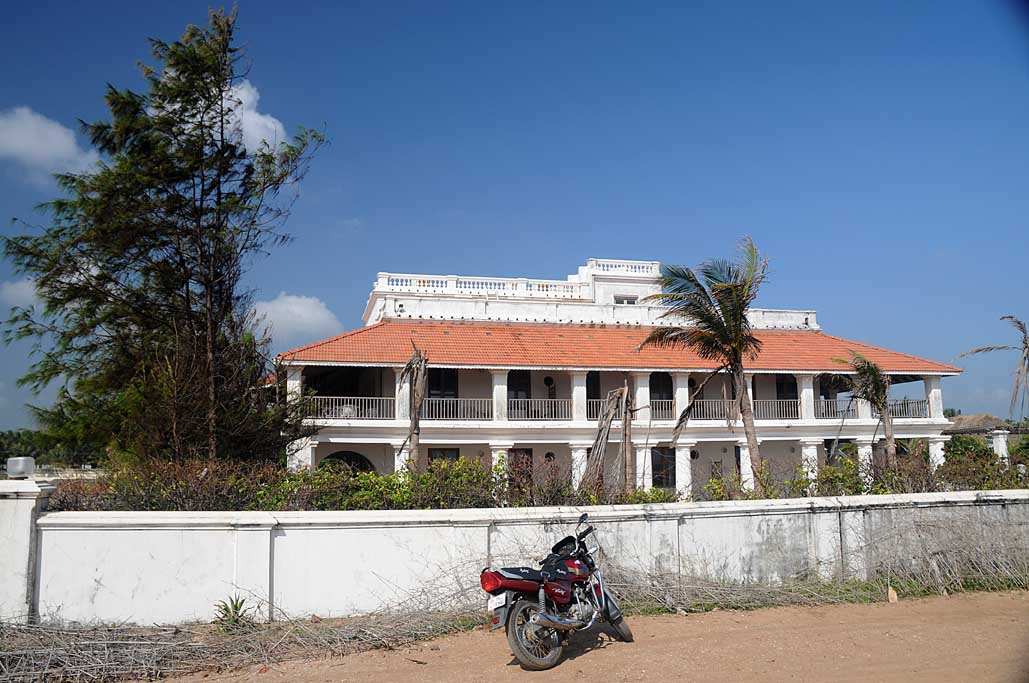
Bungalow on the Beach, Neemrana Hotels, in Tranquebar, Tamil Nadu.

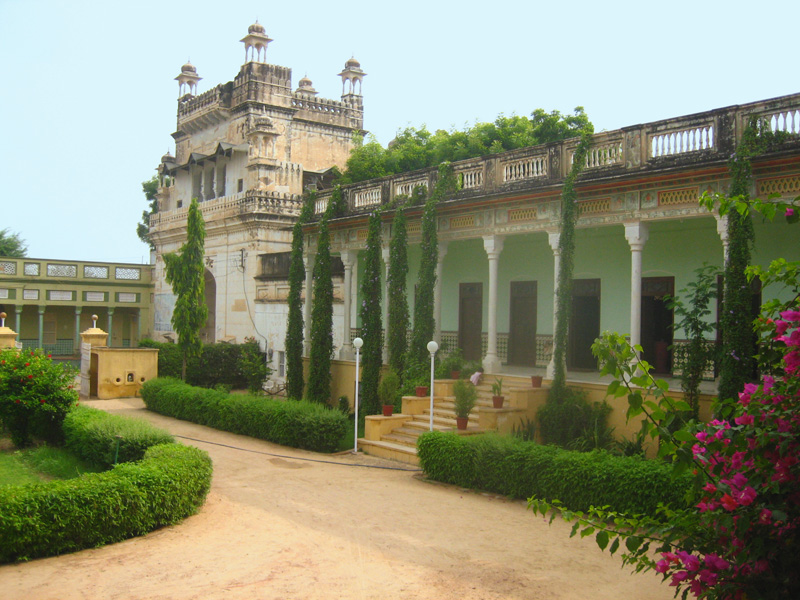
Piramal Haveli, Bagar, Rajasthan.

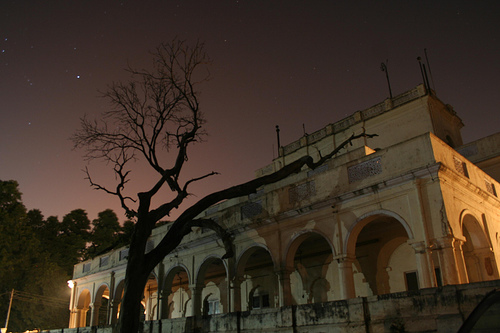
Rajindra Kothi (Baradari Palace), Patiala, became Punjab's first heritage hotel in 2009.

Ruins and forts restored by them and turned into hotels include:

- 14th century, Hill Fort Kesroli (Alwar, Rajasthan)
- 15th century, Neemrana Fort-Palace (Delhi-Jaipur highway, Shekhawati, Rajasthan)
- 17th century, The Tower House (Cochin, Kerala)
- 17th century, The Bungalow on the Beach (Tharangambadi, Tamil Nadu)
- 17th century, Tijara Fort-Palace (Alwar, Rajasthan)
- 20th century, Neemrana's Three Waters (Goa)
- 19th century, The Wallwood Garden (Coonoor, Tamil Nadu)
- 19th century, The Baradari Palace (Patiala, Punjab),
- 19th century, The Ramgarh Bungalows (Ramgarh Kumaon Hills, Uttarakhand),
- 20th century, Piramal Haveli, (Bagar, Shekhavati, Rajasthan)
- 21st century, The Glasshouse on the Ganges (Rishikesh, Uttarakhand, belonging to the maharaja of Tehri Garhwal)

== Additional business streams ==
The company also manufactures jam from the fruit orchards in Ramgarh, and tea from the plantations in Coonoor and Coffee from Coorg. It also runs a "Neemrana Music Foundation". The clientele, which initially consisted mostly of foreign tourists, is now (as of 2010) 70% Indian.

== Books ==
Books published as part of the project(?) include:

- The Painted Frescoes of Shekhavati
- Jaipur: the Last Destination
- Arts and Crafts of Rajasthan
