= Nizamuddin East =

- Neighborhood of Delhi
- Location in Delhi, India
- Coordinates: 28.59°N 77.25°E
- Country: India
- State: Delhi

Government
  - Body: Delhi Municipality

Languages
  - Official: Hindi, Urdu, English, Punjabi
- Time zone: UTC+5:30 (IST)
- PIN: 110013
- Lok Sabha constituency: Nizamuddin East
- Vidhan Sabha constituency: Nizamuddin East
- Planning agency: Delhi Municipality

Nizamuddin East is an affluent residential colony in South East Delhi, India. It is located on Mathura Road and is home to Humayun's Tomb, as well as that of Abdul Rahim Khan-I-Khana. There are several other monuments in the area. The colony has 286 houses, including Jaipur Estate, and 32 public parks.

== Location ==
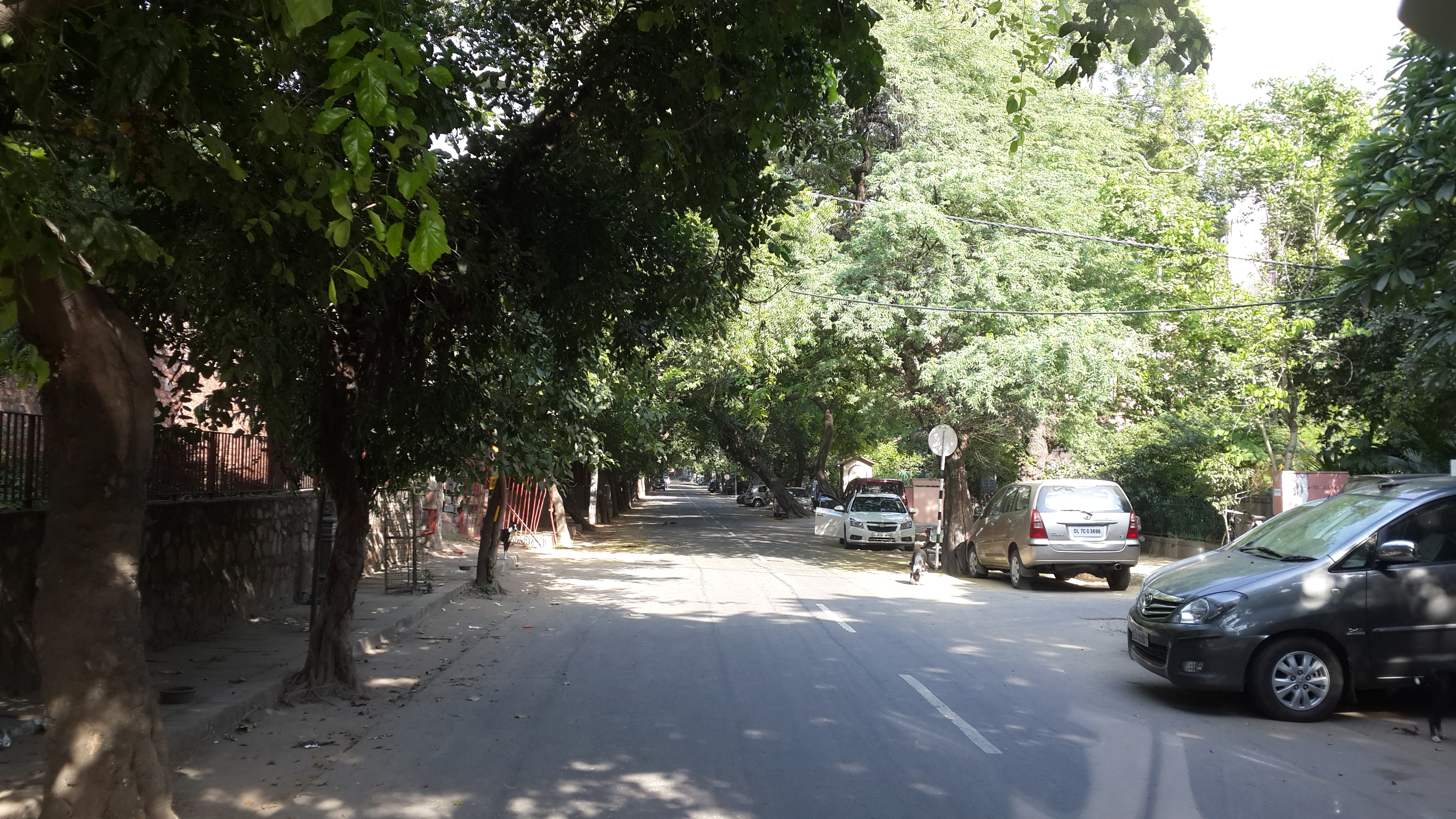
Arab Ki Sarai Road on the north periphery of Nizamuddin East

Nizamuddin, named after the 13th century Sufi saint, is a centrally located residential area within the ring road. Set in the backdrop of the spectacular Humayun's tomb, to its north and Khan Khana Tomb to its South.

== Notable residents ==
- Manmath Nath Gupta, (7 February 1908 – 26 October 2000) a great Freedom fighter who joined freedom struggle at the age of 14, and also participated with Ram Prasad Bismil and Chandra Shekhar Azad in the famous Kakori conspiracy
- Hukumat Rai Gandhi, first station master of Nizamuddin Railway Station which caused the founding of the colony and hence the first president of the resident welfare association
- Subramanian Swamy, Former Cabinet Minister - Government of India
- Sheila Dikshit, former Chief Minister of Delhi
- Navin Chawla, election commissioner
- Anjolie Ela Menon, artist
- Vasudeo S. Gaitonde, artist
- Jatin Das, artist
- Nandita Das, actress
- B. C. Sanyal, artist
- Arpita Singh, artist
- Dom Moraes, writer
- Leela Naidu, actress
- M. S. Gill, member of parliament
- Arun Bhatnagar, retired civil servant
- Aman Nath, of the Neemrana Hotels chain
- Sandeep Dikshit, former Member of parliament
- Ajay Jadeja, cricket player
- Ratna Fabri, museologist
- Dev Benegal, filmmaker
- Shyam Benegal, filmmaker
- Vinod Mehta, journalist
- Mark Tully, BBC journalist
- Ajit Bhattacharjea, Indian Express editor
- Jawed Habib, hairstylist and politician
- Vikram Seth, novelist
- Iftikhar Hussain Ansari, scholar and politician

== Transport ==
- The Hazrat Nizamuddin Railway Station.
- The Delhi Transport Corporation (DTC) buses are also run to this suburb.

== See also ==
- Nizamuddin West
