= Karl Malte von Heinz =

Austrian architect in India (1904–1971)

- Born: 1904
- Died: 17 February 1971 (aged 66–67)
- Occupation: Architect

Karl Malte von Heinz (1904 – 17 February 1971) was an Austrian architect who designed a number of buildings in India. After emigrating to British India, some of his first buildings include residences for wealthy clients in Hyderabad. In the 1930s, he designed several buildings of the Jamia Milia Islamia university. Detained by the government during World War II for his Austrian nationality, he resumed his practice upon his release in 1946.

After Indian independence, he designed various diplomatic buildings in the Chanakyapuri neighborhood of Delhi, including the missions of Pakistan, Yugoslavia, Thailand, and the Vatican. He also worked on private residences in Delhi. He is regarded as a major influence on the work of I. M. Kadri and several other architects of the 1970s.

== Career ==
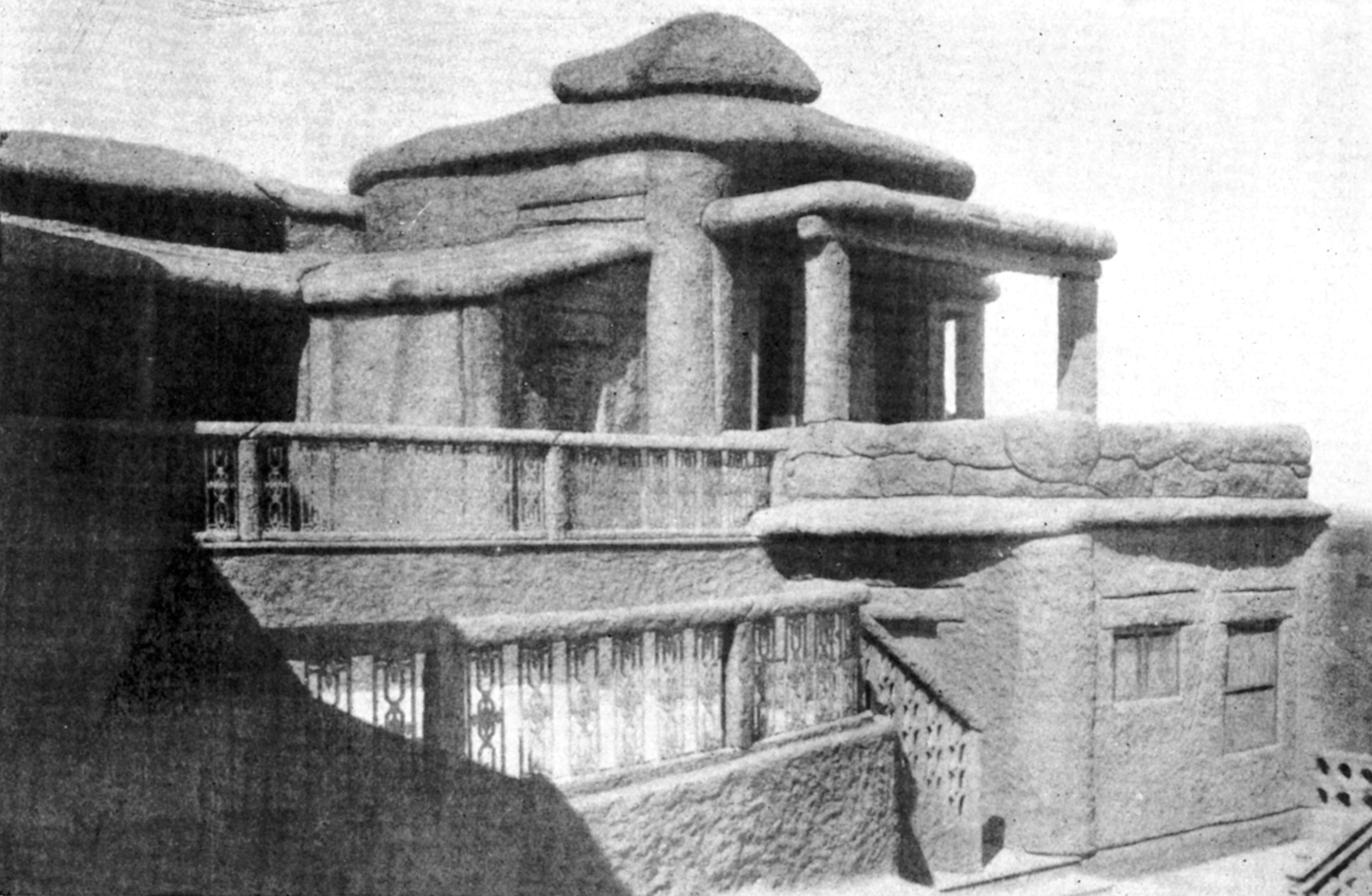
Kohistan, the residence of Mehdi Nawaz Jung, was built into natural rock formations.

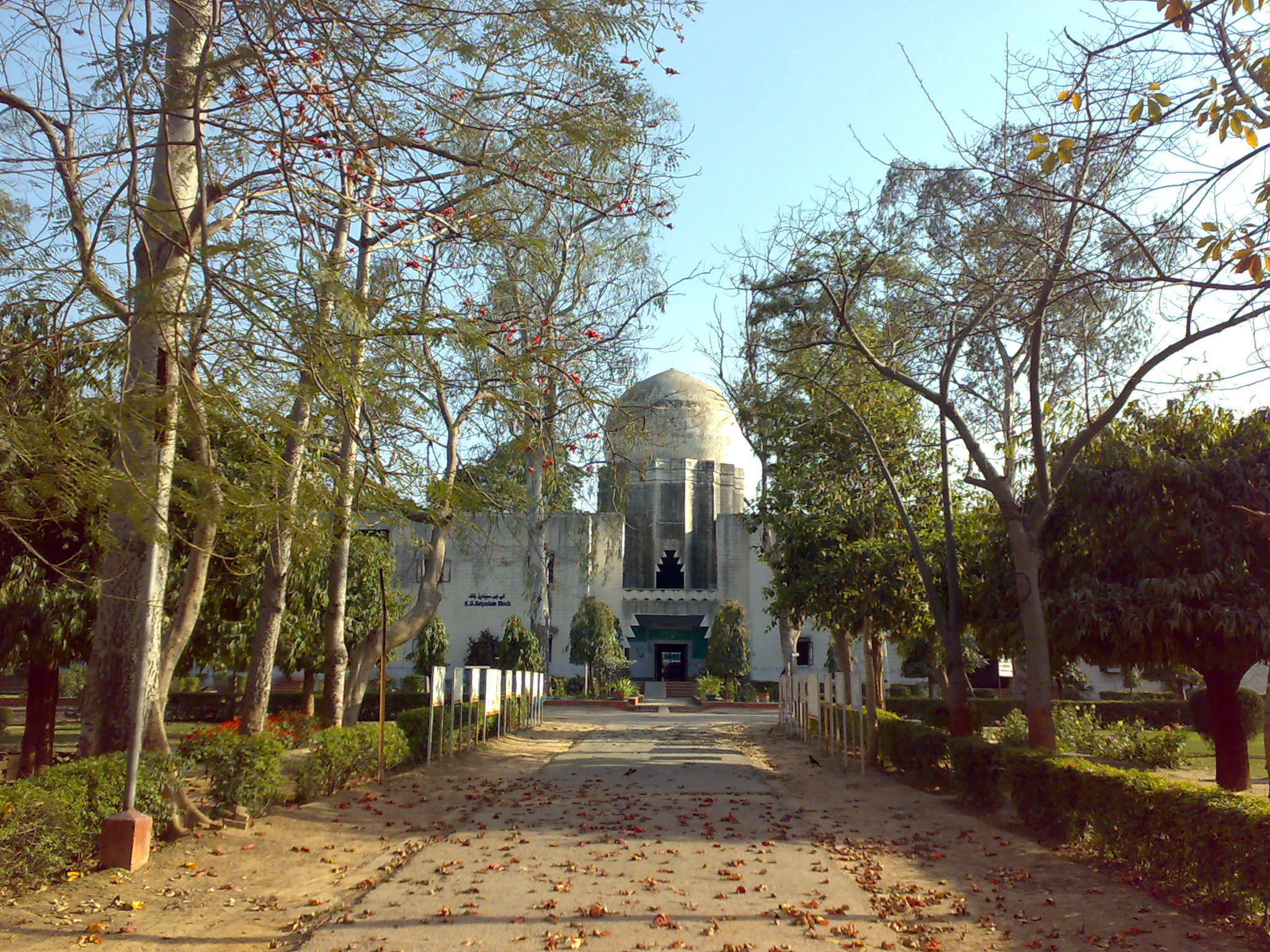
Faculty of Education, Jamia Millia Islamia

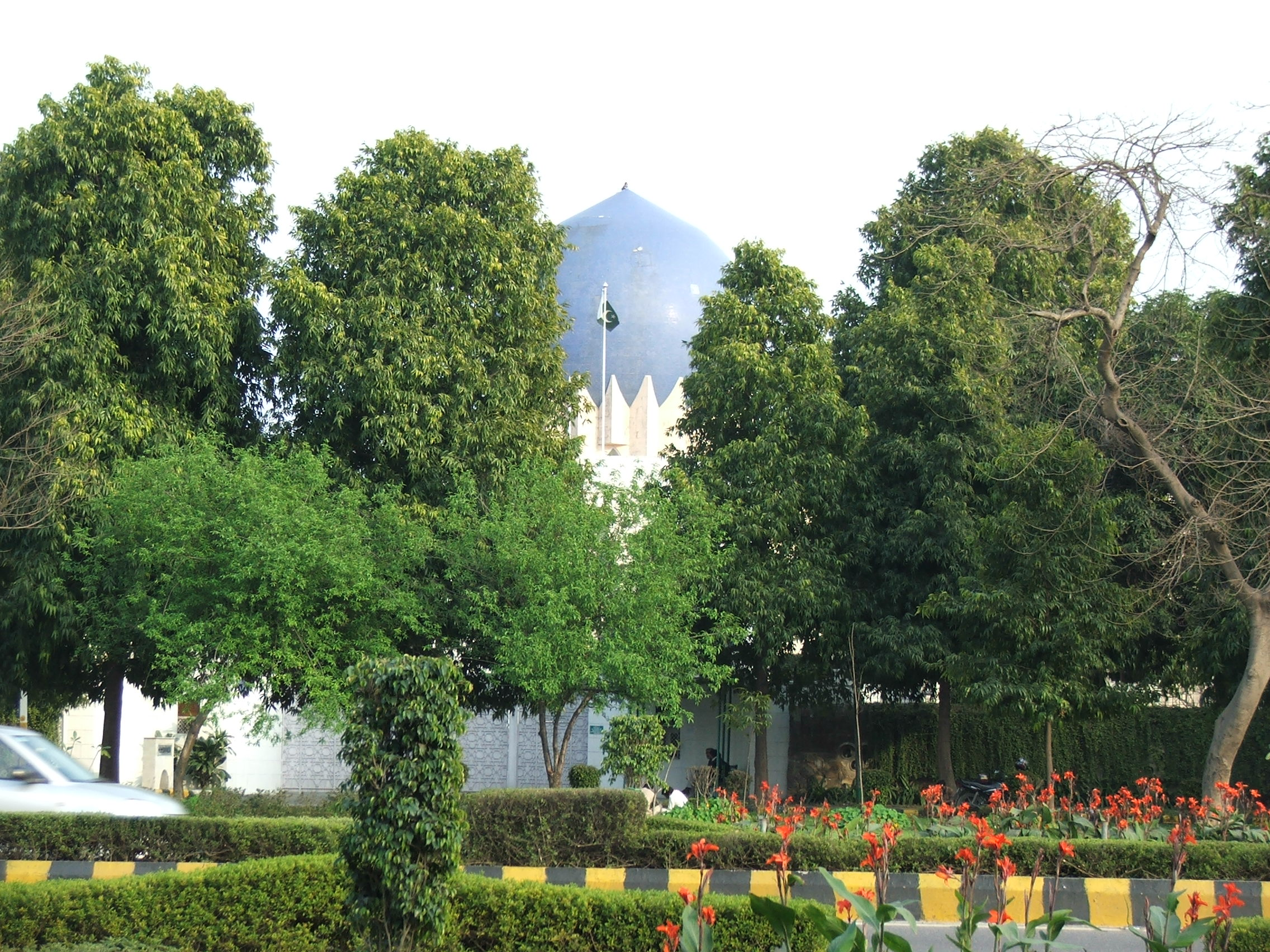
The High Commission of Pakistan, New Delhi is surmounted by a blue dome, reminiscent of Mughal architecture.

Von Heinz was educated in Paris. Not much is known about his early life and career, and no contemporary literature discussing his life exists. He had come to India as a refugee due to the crackdown on the Bauhaus movement in Nazi Germany. A source notes that he began his Indian career in Indore State, while another claims that it was Hyderabad State.

While there is no evidence of his work in Indore, he designed several mansions for noblemen in Hyderabad, and is regarded as a pioneer of the art deco style in the city. These included Kohistan, the deori of Mehdi Nawaz Jung, which is built into natural rock formations. Other residences included the Dr. Hyder Ali Khan mansion and Mount Pleasant. After his work in Hyderabad, he worked on the Pataudi Palace, a neoclassical building built around two inner courtyards, completed in 1935.

In the late 1930s, at a fundraiser in Hyderabad, he met Zakir Husain, and the two struck up a friendship. Husain was the founder of the Jamia Milia Islamia university, and at his request, von Heinz designed several buildings of the university for free. These included the faculties of Education and Natural Sciences, as well as staff and faculty quarters, and hostels for the students. The buildings were described by von Heinz as being built in the "Jamia-style", taking inspiration from Mughal architecture, especially in the use of domes and arched entrances. During this period, he also designed the Holy Family Hospital and Frank Anthony Public School.

During World War II, the British government in India detained citizens of Germany and its occupied territories and allied countries. von Heinz was also arrested due to his Austrian nationality, and only released in 1946, after the end of the war. Subsequently, he refused to return to Austria and resumed his architectural practice. Shortly after Indian independence in 1947, he was commissioned to design the Delhi School of Economics.

The newly independent Indian government established the neighborhood of Chanakyapuri, which was to house diplomatic missions of various countries to India. von Heinz was commissioned to design the High Commission of Pakistan, again drawing from Mughal architecture, which was a shared heritage between India and Pakistan. Following this, he designed the chancery and ambassador's residence for the Yugoslavian mission, working with L. Tomori. These were completed in 1965. He also designed the embassies of Thailand and the Vatican. During this period, he also designed several villas for rich businessmen in Delhi. These would often incorporate European architectural features based on the wishes of the clientele, who preferred fancy and flamboyant designs in contrast to the austere public architecture of the time period.

Von Heinz died in Delhi on 17 February 1971, and was buried in the Christian Cemetery, Prithviraj Road. I. M. Kadri considers him a major influence on his work, and he is also considered to have influenced several other architects of the 1970s.

== Style ==
His work has been described as "experimental", and "versatile", with his buildings exhibiting features from a diverse range of architectural styles, thus "refrain[ing] to adhere to any stylistic dogma".

== Personal life ==
He was married a Russian woman named Bella, who died in 1980. He was ennobled for his charitable work for the Catholic church.

== List of works ==
Name	Location	Ref.
Kohistan	Hyderabad	
Dr. Hyder Ali Khan residence	Hyderabad	
Mount Pleasant	Hyderabad	
Pataudi Palace	Pataudi	
Various buildings of the Jamia Milia Islamia	Delhi	
Frank Anthony Public School	Delhi	
Delhi School of Economics	Delhi	
High Commission of Pakistan, New Delhi	Delhi	
Embassy of Serbia, New Delhi (Note: Built as the Embassy of Yugoslavia, it was inherited by Serbia following the dissolution of Yugoslavia in 1992.)	Delhi	
Embassy of Thailand, New Delhi	Delhi	
Apostolic Nunciature to India	Delhi	
