= Aman Nath =

Indian writer, Entrepreneur, architectural restorer (born 1950)

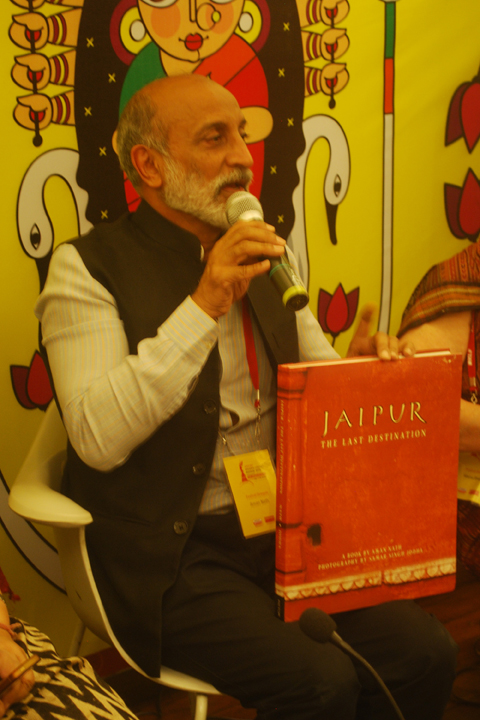
- Born: 1950 (age 75–76); New Delhi, India
- Occupations: Writer; hotelier; architectural restorer
- Title: Founder and Chairman Neemrana Hotels

Aman Nath (born 1950) is an Indian historian, writer, hotelier, and architectural restorer of ruins. He began his work with an 18th-century haveli in Haryana (1984) and the 15th-century Neemrana Fort-Palace in Rajasthan (1986), is the Founder of Neemrana Fort-Palace and the Co-Founder and Chairman of the Neemrana Hotels chain. Today, he is credited with pioneering the changed end-use of heritage buildings into hotels — making it a virtual movement in India. Since starting in 1991, Neemrana has brought back to life some 32 heritage properties and converted them into non-hotel hotels or heritage hotels.

Nath possesses a heightened sense of time against the backdrop of the cosmic clock. He was the first to recognise the immense tourism potential in restoring unlisted ruins, which led to the creation of Neemrana—India’s largest private-sector initiative in the heritage tourism sector. For his contribution to the heritage tourism movement in India, he has received numerous accolades: trade, State, National, and international honours, including Lifetime Achievement Awards from the Government of India and Condé Nast Traveller, an Aga Khan Award nomination, and the Légion d'honneur from the President of France.

Nath has published fifteen illustrated books on Rajasthan and Indian arts.

He has written 16 iconic, large-format books on historic and pilgrimage destinations such as Jaipur, Jodhpur, and Pushkar. He authored the centennial history of the Tatas, and the sesquicentennial commemorative tome for Shapoorji Pallonji. He also served as the creative director for a book on pharma giants Cipla. Two of his books are so designed that they open out to become two metres in size ! These are routinely presented to Heads of State and dignitaries visiting India.

In June 2016, Nath and five others, filed a writ petition in the Supreme Court of India challenging Section 377 of the Indian Penal Code. This resulted in the 2018 landmark judgment in Navtej Singh Johar and others v. Union of India in which the Supreme Court unanimously declared the law unconstitutional "in so far as it criminalises consensual sexual conduct between adults of the same sex".

== Early life and education ==
Born and brought up in New Delhi, Aman Nath's family migrated from Lahore to Delhi, following the partition of India in 1947. He completed his education with a post-graduate degree in medieval Indian history from St. Stephen's College,Delhi University.

From paintbrushes, poems, and prizes at school and college – Nath's talents stood out early. At 14, he ranked first among all nations in Shankar's International Painting Competition. He also went on to win the annual literary prize at St. Stephen's College, Delhi in three of his five years there, where he pursued his Master’s degree in History.

He was gifted a daughter Aadya Nath whom he has educated and raised in Delhi. After finishing her hotel management education in Switzerland, she currently works for one of India's leading hotel chains.

== Career ==
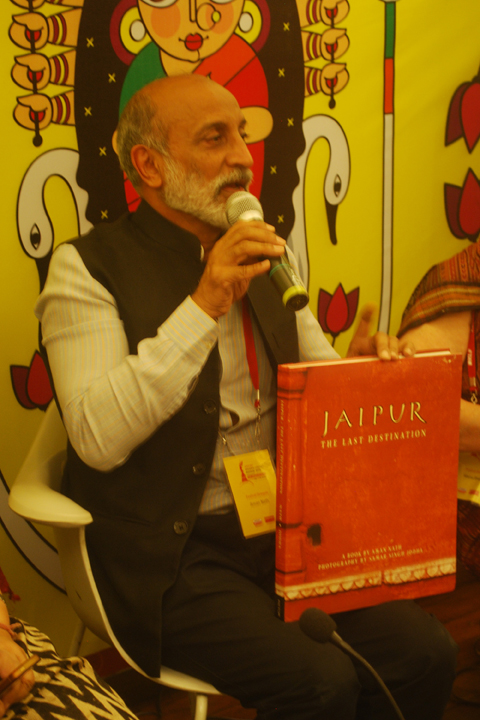
Aman Nath with his book Jaipur: The last Destination

Nath started his career as a copywriter and graphic designer in advertising. He was one of the founding members of INTACH, a heritage and conservation organisation, established in 1984. He became the arts editor for the magazine India Today, and later remained curator of "Art Today"—an art gallery of the India Today group, situated at Connaught Place, New Delhi—for seven years. Meanwhile, he started publishing books on history and heritage, including "Jaipur: the Last Destination", "Arts and Crafts of Rajasthan", and "Dome Over India: Rashtrapati Bhavan.".

He first came across the ruined 15th-century Neemarana Fort, about 120 km from Delhi, in 1981 while researching for a book on Shekhawati painting and frescoes with Francis Wacziarg, former French diplomat and resident of India since 1969. After restoring two havelis in Rajasthan, he had developed enough expertise to take on the fort. Thus in 1986, he acquired the Neemrana Fort-Palace and, after restoration, a 12-room heritage hotel was opened in 1991. Over the years, they have acquired many heritage forts and palaces and converted them into successful heritage hotels, including Hill Fort Kesroli, Pataudi Palace, and Baradari Palace in Patiala.

In 2025, Neemrana Hotels had 20 properties in 8 States.

Nath lives in the Nizamuddin East area of New Delhi.

== Works ==
- Rajasthan: the painted walls of Shekhavati, with Francis Wacziarg. Vikas Publications, 1982. ISBN 0706920872.
- Goa. Vikas Publishing House, 1984. ISBN 0706923855.
- Arts and crafts of Rajasthan, with Francis Wacziarg. Mapin Publishing, 1997. ISBN 0944142060.
- Horizons: the Tata-India century, 1904–2004, with Jay Vithalani, Tulsi Vatsal, Amit Pasricha (photographs). India Book House, 2004. ISBN 8175084316.
- Larger Than Life: The Popular Arts of India. India Book House, 2004. ISBN 8175083042.
- Palaces of Rajasthan, with George Michell, Antonio Martinelli (photographs). Frances Lincoln, 2005.
- Brahma's Pushkar: ancient Indian pilgrimage. Rajan Kapoor (photographs). India Book House, 2005. ISBN 8175083719.
- Jaipur: The Last Destination, with Samar Singh Jodha (photographs), India Book House, 2006. ISBN 978-81-7508-188-8.
- Dome Over India. India Book House, 2006. ISBN 8175083522.
- Jodhpur's Umaid Bhawan: The Maharaja of palaces : a book, with Fred R. Holmes, Anna Newton Holmes, Amit Paschira (photographer). India Book House, 2008. ISBN 8175085118.
- The Monumental India book. Amit Pasricha (photographer). Constable, 2008. ISBN 1845298829.

== Contributions ==
- Colonie? Colony?, France and India, FICCI, New Delhi, 2008.
- Foreword, India by Design: The Pursuit of Luxury & Fashion by Michael Borian and Alif de Poix. John Wiley and Sons, Singapore, 2010.
- Miniature of a Mughal Prince, in A History of the World in 100 Objects by Neil MacGregor. Allen Lane, London, 2010.
- Introduction and Two Discoveries, in Journeys Through Rajasthan. Rupa Publishers, Delhi, 2011.
- Foreword, Decoded Paradox by J. J. Valaya. Delhi, 2011.
- Beauty in India, in Travelling In, Travelling Out: A Book of Unexpected Journeys, ed. Namita Gokhale. HarperCollins, Noida, 2014.
- A Dialogue on Tommaso Colonnello’s Art, in There's Something in the Air: 70 Life Stories from India and Italy, ed. Lorenzo Angeloni and Maria Elettra Verone. Juggernaut Books, New Delhi, 2018.
- Review of Palace of Clouds: A Memoir by Rajyashree Kumari Bikaner. Bloomsbury, New Delhi, 2018.
- Cipla. Pictor/Shoestring, Bombay, 2021.
