= Le Colonial =

Heritage hotel in Fort Kochi, Kerala, India

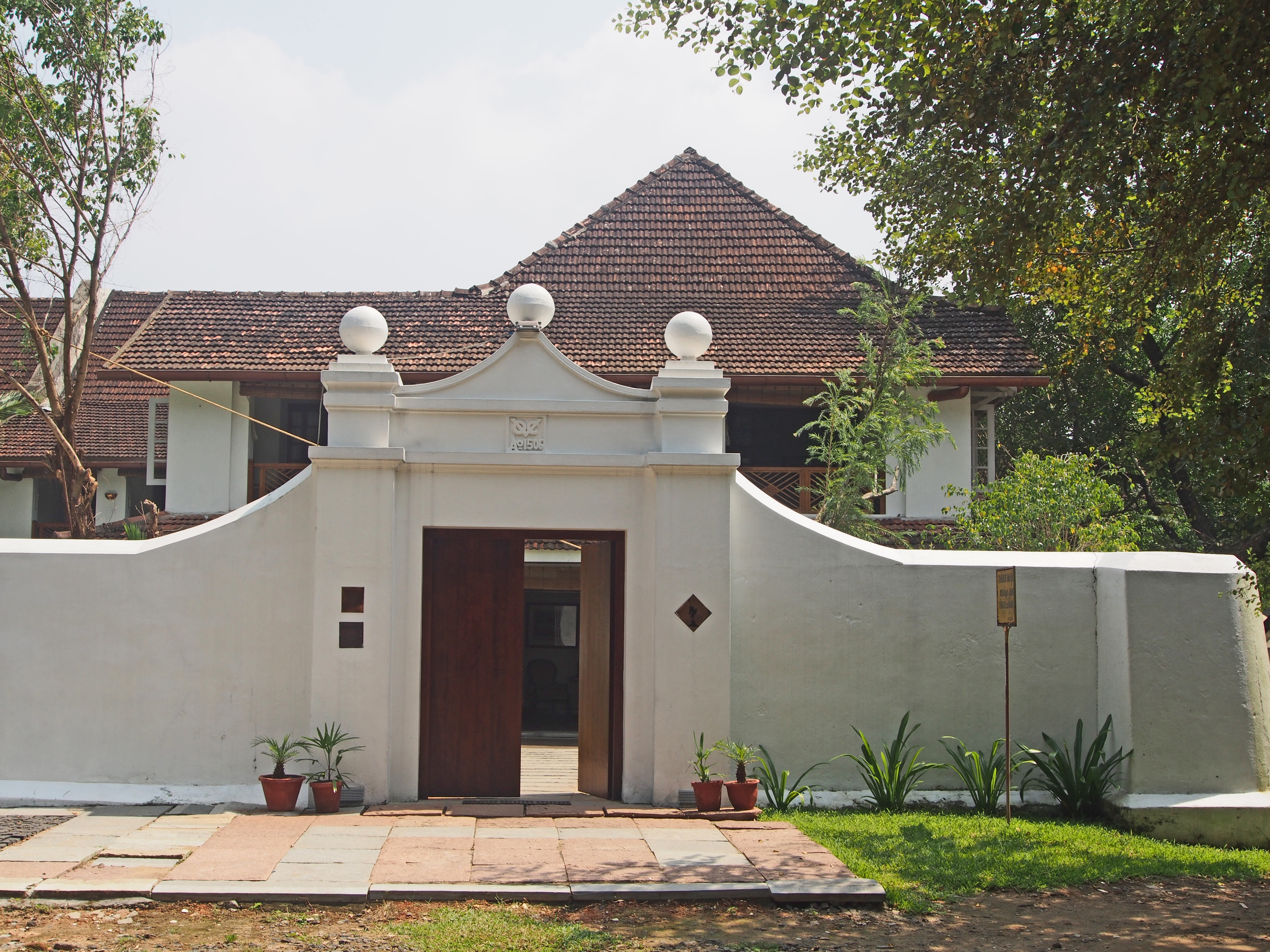
- Entrance of Le Colonial in 2014
- Hotel chain: Neemrana Hotels

General information
- Location: 1/315 Vasco da Gama Square, Church Rd, Fort Kochi, Kerala, 682001
- Opening: 1506; 520 years ago 2004; 22 years ago (as heritage hotel)
- Owner: John Persenda
- Operator: Neemrana Hotels

Other information
- Number of rooms: 7

Le Colonial (also known as the St Francis Bungalow, J Thomas Bungalow, and Jan van Spall Huiss) is an historical colonial house located in Kochi, Kerala, India. It is now a luxury heritage boutique hotel after being acquired by Neemrana Hotels in 2004. Built in 1506 by the Portuguese, it served as a governor's residence and is considered Asia's oldest surviving colonial house, having also hosted figures like Vasco da Gama.

== History ==
Le Colonial was built by the Portuguese in 1506, at the same time as St Francis Church. It is said to have housed Francis Xavier, granting it the name St Francis Bungalow, and has additionally housed Vasco da Gama. It was the Portuguese governor's private residence as opposed to his main office.

It remained in the hands of the Portuguese for 150 years, and when Kochi was conquered by the Dutch, it was one of the rare houses not to be destroyed during the assault. After Kochi was conquered, Le Colonial housed the Dutch governor.Above the main gate, the date of construction and the Dutch addition of "VOC" can be seen, as it was owned by the Venerable Dutch East India Company. During the Dutch occupation, French Admiral Mahé de La Bourdonnais, while traveling from Pondichéry to Mahé in North Kerala, spent a night as a guest in the house. In 1795, Major Petrie and his British East India Company army took over Fort Cochin. After the capitulation, van Spall received Major Petrie as his guest in the house, who had added lithographs and etches onto the wall.

Le Colonial housed the Dutch governor until 1795, when it was sold to the British by the last Dutch governor Jan van Spall, and the original sales deed can be seen framed in the house. By 1947, it belonged to J. Thomas, a British tea trader, and the house came known to be as the J Thomas Bungalow. In 2004, it was saved as a historic monument as it got acquired by Neemrana Hotels, and was restored. It is currently owned by John Persenda. The house now contains many works of art and antique furniture. Each room is named and styled after figures connected with its past: Jan van Spall, Major Petrie, J Thomas, Vasco da Gama, Mahé de La Bourdonnais, Tipu Sultan, the British viceroy and his ADC.

== See also ==
- Vasco House, Kochi
