= V. P. Menon: The Unsung Architect of Modern India =

2020 biography by Narayani Basu

V. P. Menon: The Unsung Architect Of Modern India
- Author: Narayani Basu
- Language: Indian English
- Genre: Biography
- Publication place: India

V.P. Menon: The Unsung Architect of Modern India is a non-fiction book by V. P. Menon's great-granddaughter Narayani Basu, published by Simon & Schuster India in 2020. The book is a biography of V. P. Menon, an Indian civil servant who assisted Sardar Patel in the political integration of India, and was one of the founders of Swatantra Party which advocated free market policies.

== Publication ==
V.P. Menon: The Unsung Architect of Modern India is written by analyst Narayani Basu, great-granddaughter of V. P. Menon, and it is published by Simon & Schuster India.

Subrahmanyam Jaishankar, external affairs minister of India, had released the book on 12 February 2020. Book has 432 pages.

== Summary ==
Vappala Pangunni Menon was the Indian civil servant who is popularly known as right hand of Sardar Patel in political integration of princely states to India. Menon came from the humble family which had roots in the Kerala. He left the school and home before the matriculation and started working as coolie in the Kolar gold mines.

Later, he sold towels in the Mumbai and then he got temporary government job as a typist. Then he became the important civil servant during the British Raj and later played major part in political integration of India.

== Reception ==
Ranjona Banerji, writing for the Deccan Chronicle finds that merely writing a book on Menon is "insufficient" and that Menon deserved a "more intimate portrait without the massive presence of Indian history as a distraction and detraction".

In the review for The Sunday Guardian, Arun Bhatnagar, former IAS, called the work as well researched; added that Basu's work is based on wide-ranging study and archival material. Therefore, the work, according to Bhatnagar, succeeds in projecting an objective assessment of Menon's personality and achievement. "For an upcoming generation", wrote Bhatnagar,"Narayani Basu’s important book can be especially relevant". Sumit Ganguly, writing for India Today, called the book as "result of painstaking research in multiple archives, the culling of evidence drawn from memoirs and the deft use of oral histories".

Rishi Raj, over review in The Financial Express, wrote that book filled the vacuum. He added that Basu had done the challenging work by writing biography of person whose life is generally buried in the files and drafts. "The last chapters of the book", wrote Raj,"bring much to light about the Nehru-Patel equation, which show the first prime minister in poor light." Raj also wrote that author "needs to be applauded for writing a non-ideological account that doesn't have heroes and villains but human beings with their strengths and faults".

According to Soni Mishra, who reviewed work for The Week, "seamlessness with which Basu has combined her quest for the unknown facets of her great-grandfather's life with a larger perspective on the Independence movement and fresh insights on the period" makes the book special. Sarah Farooqi, writing review in Business Standard, called the scope of the book is "vast".

Firstpost listed the book in the list of books of week on 9 February 2020. Hindustan Times also listed the book in "most interesting books of week".
