= Nehru Centre =

Memorial in Mumbai, India

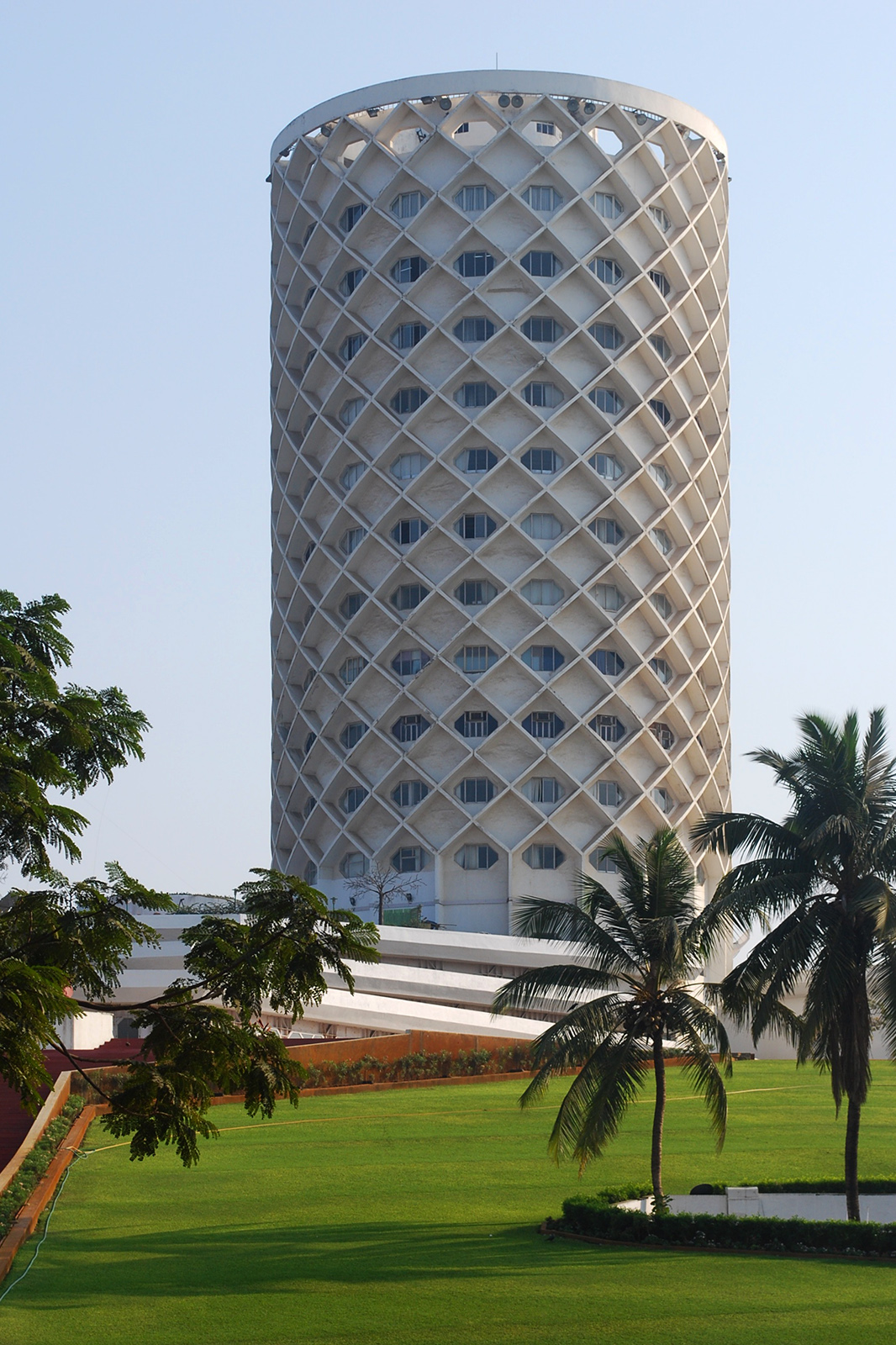
Nehru Centre, Mumbai

Nehru Centre is a centre to promote the teachings and ideals of the first Prime Minister of India, Jawaharlal Nehru, through educational and cultural programmes in the city of Mumbai, India. The Centre organises scientific, cultural and educational activities. It was conceived in 1972, with foundation stone was laid by Indira Gandhi and the centre was completed in 1985 on a six-acre site in Worli. Designed by architect I.M. Kadri, the building's distinctive cylindrical tower with an ascending landscaped slope at its base symbolizes Nehru's vision of India's growth from agrarian roots to industrial modernity. It houses an auditorium, planetarium, art galleries, a library, and the "Discovery of India" exhibition.

== History and architecture ==
The Nehru Centre was conceived in 1972 by lawyer-politician Rajni Patel, with the foundation stone laid on 2 November that year by Prime Minister Indira Gandhi. It was designed by I.M. Kadri, the centre was completed in 1985 at a cost of ₹9 crore, realized as a "living memorial" to India's first Prime Minister.

The centerpiece is a cylindrical tower rising from a sloping green base evoking Nehru's metaphor of India growing from agriculture to industry and clad in latticed jaali inspired by the rose motif often associated with Nehru. The centre spans approximately 322,000 sq ft, and includes a 1,000-seat auditorium, planetarium (commissioned in 1977), art gallery, library, and research facilities, organized within open-plan spaces and castellated beams to accommodate exhibitions and cultural events.

== Departments ==
=== Nehru Planetarium ===
This planetarium was commissioned on 3 March 1977. It has grown into a centre for scientific study of astronomy and for meeting of scientists and scholars for discussions and lectures. Events like Science quiz contests, Astro-painting, Science elocution, Astro-poetry and Astro-quiz competitions are organised in order to inspire students.

=== Discovery of India ===
Discovery of India consists of 14 galleries depicting every aspect of artistic, intellectual and philosophical attainment of India through ages. This exposition seeks to determine true identity of the country. This department also holds activities such as Discovery of India Elocution Competition, Quiz Competition and Essay Competition and science workshop for students every year.

=== Library ===
Nehru Centre Library is located on the first floor of the Discovery of India building. It has about 25,000 books on various disciplines like religion, philosophy, social sciences, astronomy and allied sciences, arts and architecture, literature, history, geography and biographies. There is also a good collection of books on and by Pt. Jawahar Lal Nehru and Mahatma Gandhi.

=== Art Gallery ===
Situated on the ground floor of the Discovery of India building, this gallery consists of two parts. The Nehru Centre Art Gallery is dedicated to promotion of young talent and provides a platform for them to exhibit their work along with that of eminent artists.

=== Culture Wing ===
Regular cultural programmes are organised by Culture wing in all branches of performing arts, like dance, drama, music, etc.

== Publications ==
Some of the books published by Nehru Centre are the following:

- Nehru Revisited by M. V. Kamath
- Witness to History: Transition and Transformation of India (1947-64)

== See also ==
- Nehru Science Centre
