= Hill Fort Kesroli =

14th-century fort in Rajasthan, India

Coordinates: 27.5489507°N 76.7114854°E

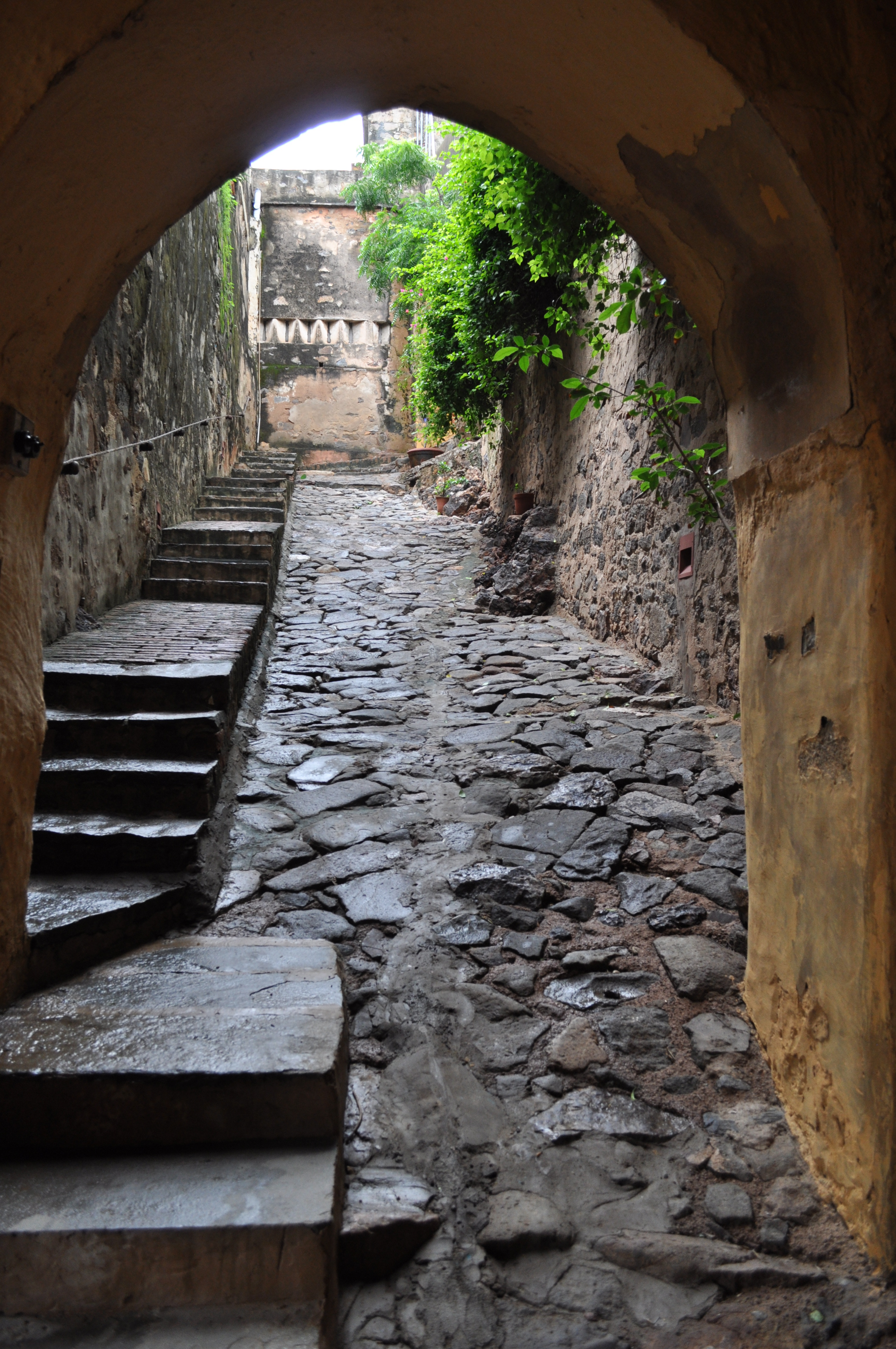
A passage at the Hill Fort, Kesroli.

The Hill Fort of Kesroli is a 14th-century fort located in Alwar district, Rajasthan, India. It is now a heritage hotel managed by Neemrana Hotels group., known for its turrets, ramparts, and arched verandahs and today considered one of the best heritage hotels in India.

== History ==
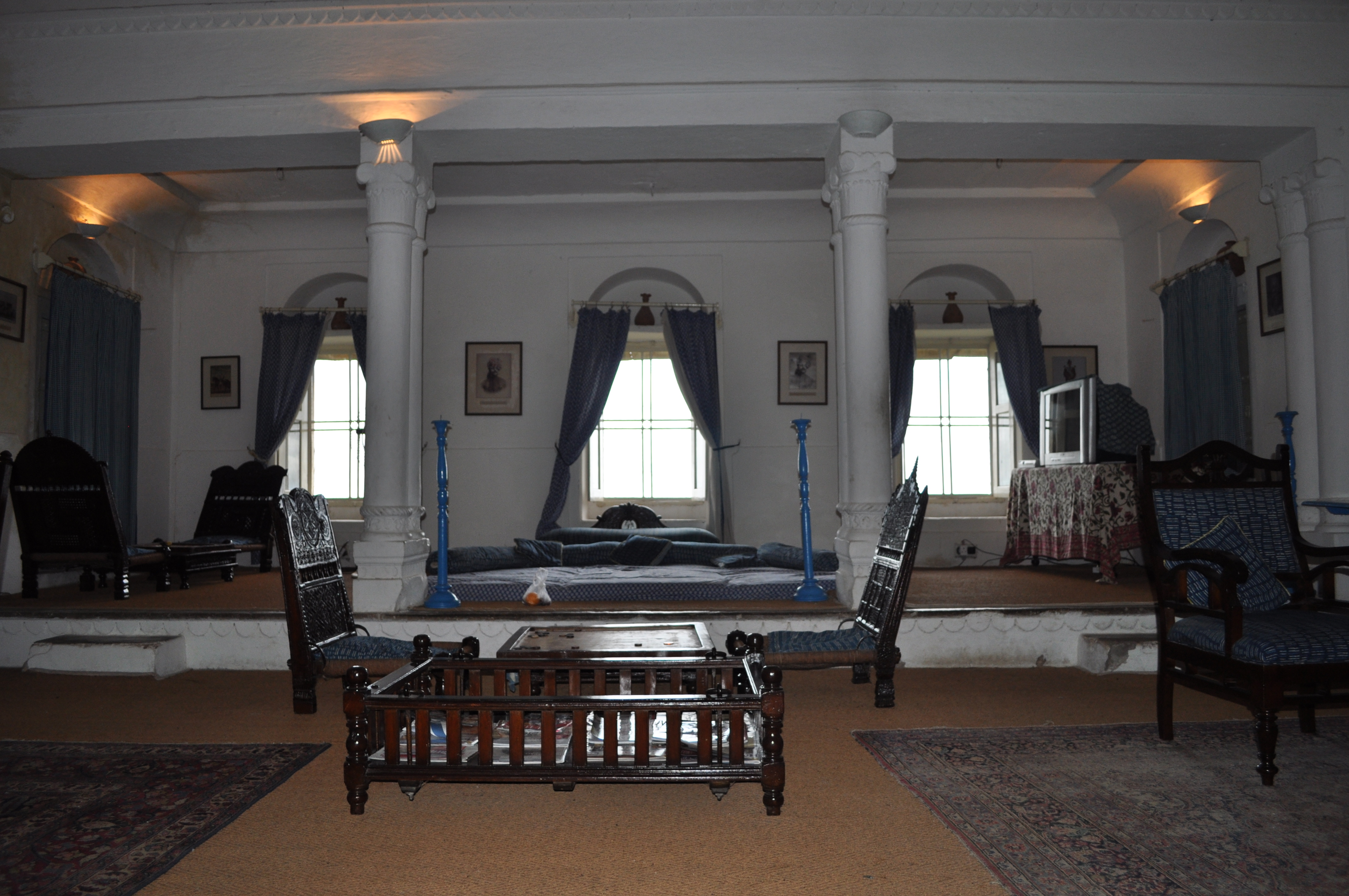
The main hall at the Hill Fort, Kesroli.

It was built back in 14th century by kings who are said to be descendants of Rajasthan. The fort was then occupied by Khanzadas after having converted to Islam in the middle of the 14th century.

Through the centuries, the seven-turreted fort has changed hands many times. It then finally came back into the hands of the Rajputs in 1775, at the time the princely state of Alwar was founded. The fort knew a golden period under Ranawat Thakur Bhawani Singh (1882–1934).

Under co‑owners Aman Nath and Francis Wacziarg, a meticulous restoration initiated in 1995 and culminating in 1998 continued into the 2000s, balancing conservation of 14th‑century masonry, turrets, ramparts and arched verandahs with the integration of modern hospitality infrastructure In 2004, the fort was leased to heritage company Neemrana Hotels by Wing Cdr. Mangal Singh. Subsequently, it was restored by co-owners of the group and restorers, Aman Nath and Francis Wacziarg.

== Architecture ==
Hill Fort Kesroli is a 14th‑century Rajput stronghold perched on dark Hornstone Breccia, its seven turrets and ramparts rising 50–65 m above the surrounding farmland. The restoration preserved its coursed sandstone ramparts, arched verandahs and lofty arched gateways, while the interiors were fitted with appropriate colonial and indigenous furnishings without over‑sanitizing original patinas and mortar joints. Currently, the Hill Fort of Kesroli is a 31-room hotel.
