= Danish Governor Bungalow =

Coordinates: 11.02586894904417°N 79.85532961046106°E

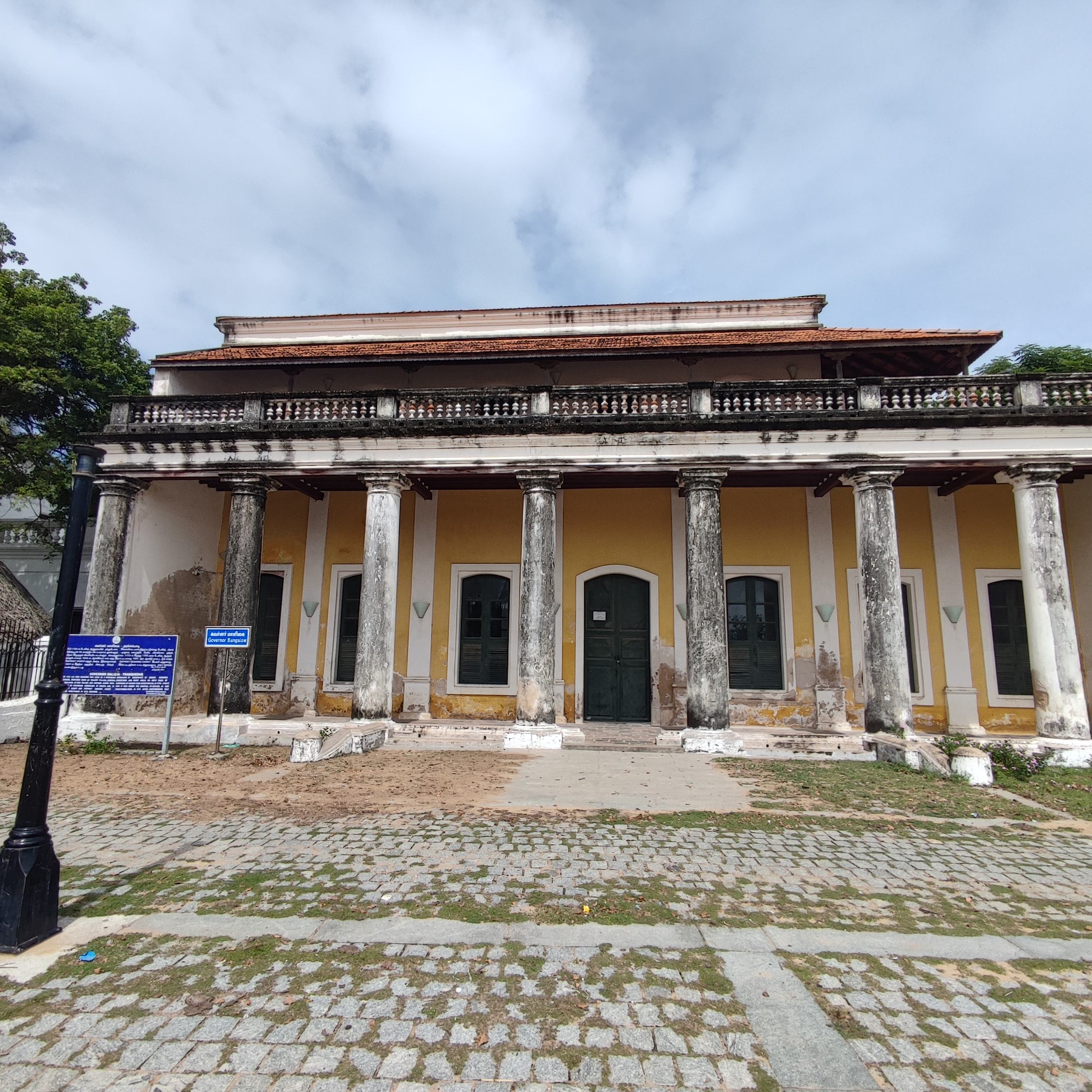
Governors Bungalow.jpg, in Tranquebar, Tamil Nadu

The Danish Governor Bungalow, is a 17th-century Danish colonial house which has belonged to the Governor of Danish India. The House was called Black Court, and was used as a consideration to the ethnic people taking into account the customs and traditions of the Indiens, after the exit of the Danes in 1845, the house was used by the British administrator of the colony. Built in the 18th century, opposite Fort Dansborg, by the Danish East India Company in what was once a pepper trading post of Tranquebar, now known as Tharangambadi, in Tamil Nadu, India. Tranquebar is a Danish term that comes from the native Tamil word Tarangambadi, which means 'place of the singing waves'.

== History ==
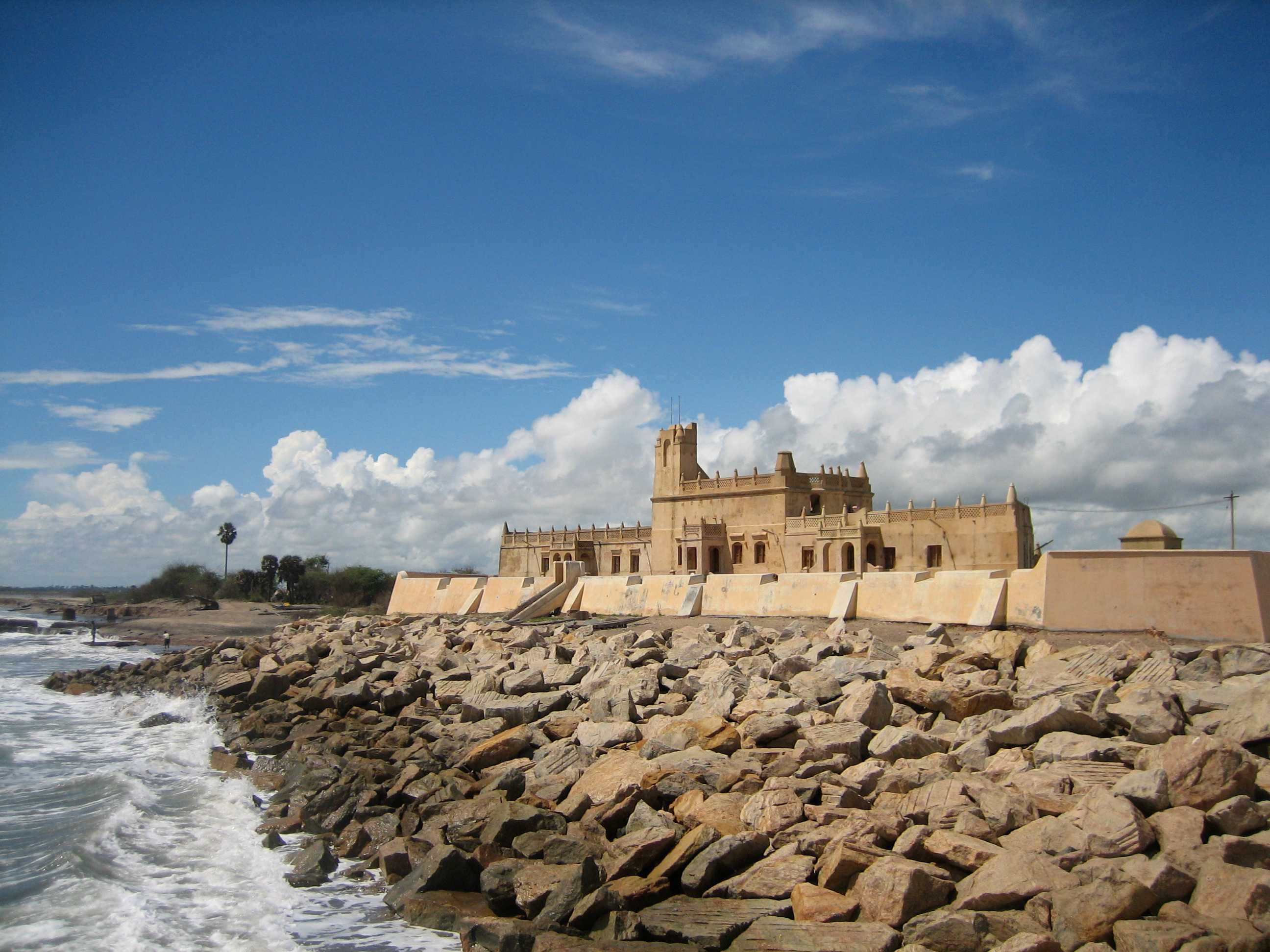
Fort Dansborg at Tranquebar, built by Danish Admiral Ove Gedde, in 1620.

Founded in 1616, following a privilege of Danish King Christian IV, the Danish East India Company, set up its base in Tranquebar, in the fort Dansborg, which was the seat of its Governor of Danish India, styled Opperhoved. Here Ove Gjedde, a Danish admiral arrived in 1620. He was given territory by the Nayak ruler of Tanjore. The Danish then settled there so as to export pepper to Denmark. They remained there until 1845, when after suffering heavy losses, the colony of Tranquebar was sold to British Raj, thereafter the house became the residence of the British administrator of the colony.
