= Arun Bhatnagar =

Indian civil servant

Arun Bhatnagar अरुण भटनागर
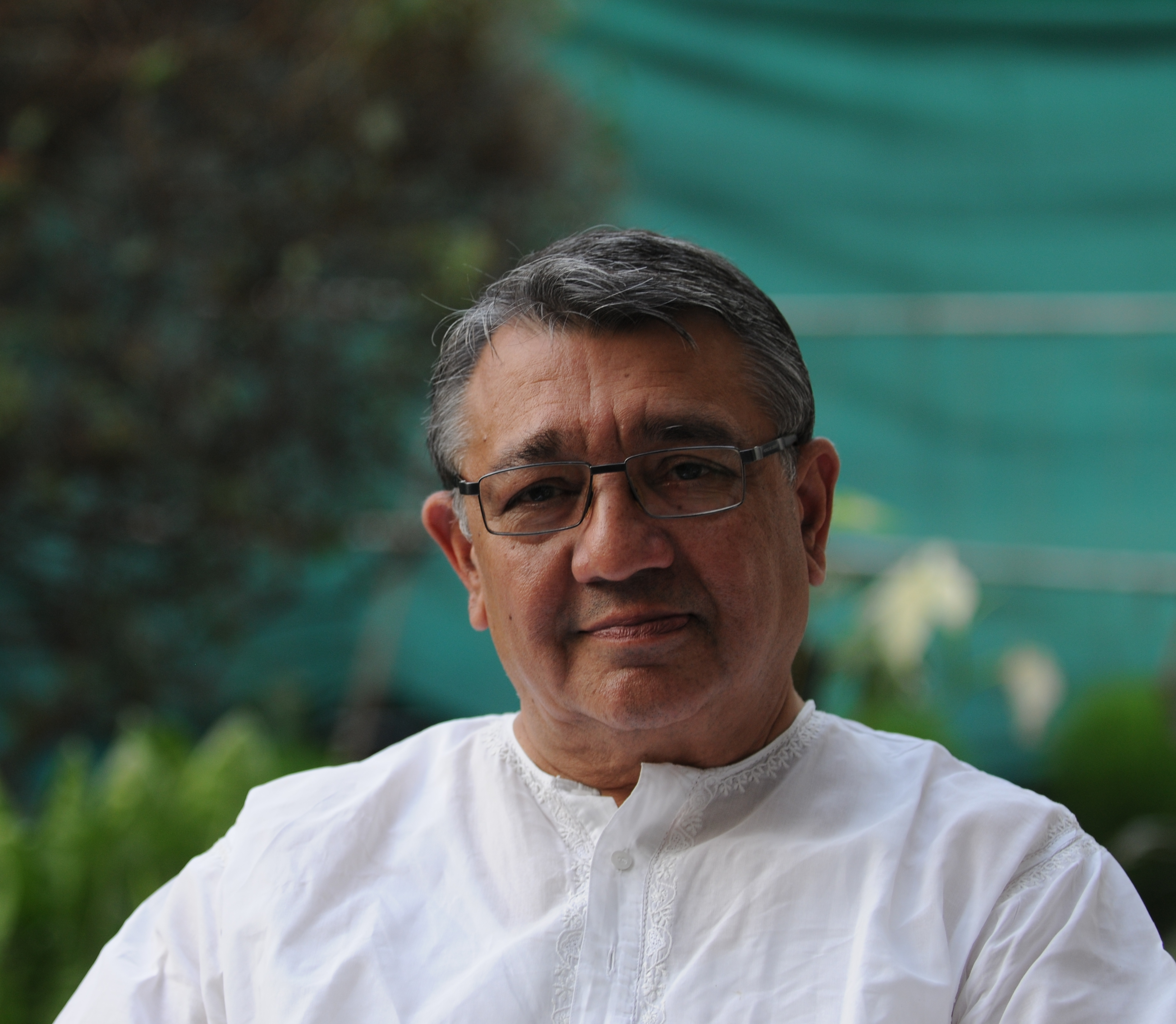
- Born: 10 June 1944 (age 82); New Delhi, India
- Education: St. Stephen's College, Delhi; Delhi University
- Occupation: Former Civil Servant
- Spouse: Kalpana Bhatnagar

Arun Bhatnagar (Hindi: अरुण भटनागर; born 10 June 1944) is a former Indian Administrative Service (IAS) officer of the 1966 batch of the Madhya Pradesh cadre who has served in various capacities in the State and with the Government of India. Bhatnagar retired from the IAS in June, 2004 as Secretary, Department of Personnel and Training and worked, thereafter, as Secretary, National Advisory Council (2004–08) and Chairman, Prasar Bharati (2008–09) at New Delhi.

He is Chairperson of the Hali Panipati Trust, which commemorates the life and work of Maulana Altaf Hussain Hali (1837- 1914), renowned poet, social reformer and shagird of Mirza Ghalib, hailing from Panipat in present-day Haryana.

He lives in Nizamuddin East, New Delhi, India.

== Personal life ==
Bhatnagar was born in New Delhi and attended St. Columba's School till grade XI after which he joined St. Stephen's College, Delhi for degree (B.A.) in Economics.

Bhatnagar claims descent from Munshi Har Gopal Tufta or "Mirza" Tufta, Mirza Ghalib’s contemporary and best known friend and a well known poet in his own right in Urdu and Persian.

He is the paternal grandson of the eminent scientist, Sir Shanti Swarup Bhatnagar, OBE, FRS, architect of the Council of Scientific and Industrial Research and of the chain of National Laboratories in the country, Secretary, Ministry of Natural Resources & Scientific Research, Ministry of Education and first Chairman of the University Grants Commission (1953–55).

== Career ==
Bhatnagar entered the IAS in 1966 at 22 years; his assignments with the Government of India and the Government of Madhya Pradesh include:

Assignments between 1967 – 84: Allotted to Madhya Pradesh cadre and worked in Field and Secretariat positions in the State, including as District Collector and District Magistrate, Sehore (1973 – 75). As Collector, Sehore, he is well remembered for the exemplary relief and rehabilitation work carried out by him and his colleagues (comprising officials, non- officials and voluntary agencies) in the Budhni and Narsrullahganj areas in the particularly intense monsoon rains of 1973. These efforts were widely commended. On deputation to the Government of India as Deputy Secretary, Ministry of Power (1975 – 79). Later, he served in the State Government at Bhopal as Special Secretary (Finance & Planning) and as Secretary between 1979 – 84.

Assignments between 1984 – 1992: Joint Secretary, Ministry of Power between 1984 – 89 and Chairman & Managing Director, Rural Electrification Corporation Limited (1985 – 86). Secretary to the Chief Minister Sunder Lal Patwa and, concurrently, Secretary in various Departments (1989–92).

Assignments between 1992 – 2004 in the Government of India: Joint Secretary to Dr Shankar Dayal Sharma, President of India (1992 – 94), Minister (Economic), High Commission of India, London (1994–96), Additional Secretary, Department of Telecommunications, Government of India (1996–98), Principal Adviser, Planning Commission in the rank and pay of Secretary to the Government of India (1998 – 99), Secretary, Ministry of Youth Affairs and Sports: 1999 – 2000, Secretary, Ministry of Rural Development: 2000 – 02, Secretary, Food & Public Distribution: 2002 – 03, Secretary, Department of Personnel and Training: 2003 – 04.

As Secretary, Ministry of Rural Development, Bhatnagar played an key role in the conceptualization and implementation of the PMGSY, which was launched in 2000 - 01.

He retired from the IAS in June, 2004 and worked, thereafter, as Secretary, National Advisory Council (2004 – 08) and Chairman, Prasar Bharati (2008 – 09) at New Delhi.

Several articles written by him have been published in the Times of India, The Illustrated Weekly of India, The Pioneer and, more recently, Dawn

== Writing career ==
Bhatnagar authored "India: Shedding the Past, Embracing the Future (1906-2017)" which was published by Konark Publishers Pvt Ltd ISBN 978-93-22008-90-1.

A second Book “Nehru Saga” dedicated to the late Pandit Motilal Nehru appeared in 2019 ISBN 978-93-53475-63-5.

His latest “Orphaned at Freedom: A Subcontinent’s Tale” ISBN 978-93-56114-78-4 has been published in August, 2022. It is in the genre of historical fiction, covers India, Pakistan and Bangladesh and is set in the twentieth century of the Subcontinent, pre-and post- Independence. The narrative is inspired by events that were happening and the circumstances reflect real-life experiences. Most of the European names are the actual ones pertaining to that period, as are many of the Indian, Pakistani and Bangladeshi ones. It revolves around the life-story (1911–99) of a Lahore-born member of the Indian Civil Service (ICS), with family-roots in Bengal, and who is later a leading Barrister and a Union Minister.
