= I. M. Kadri =

Indian architect (born 1929)

Iftikhar M. Kadri
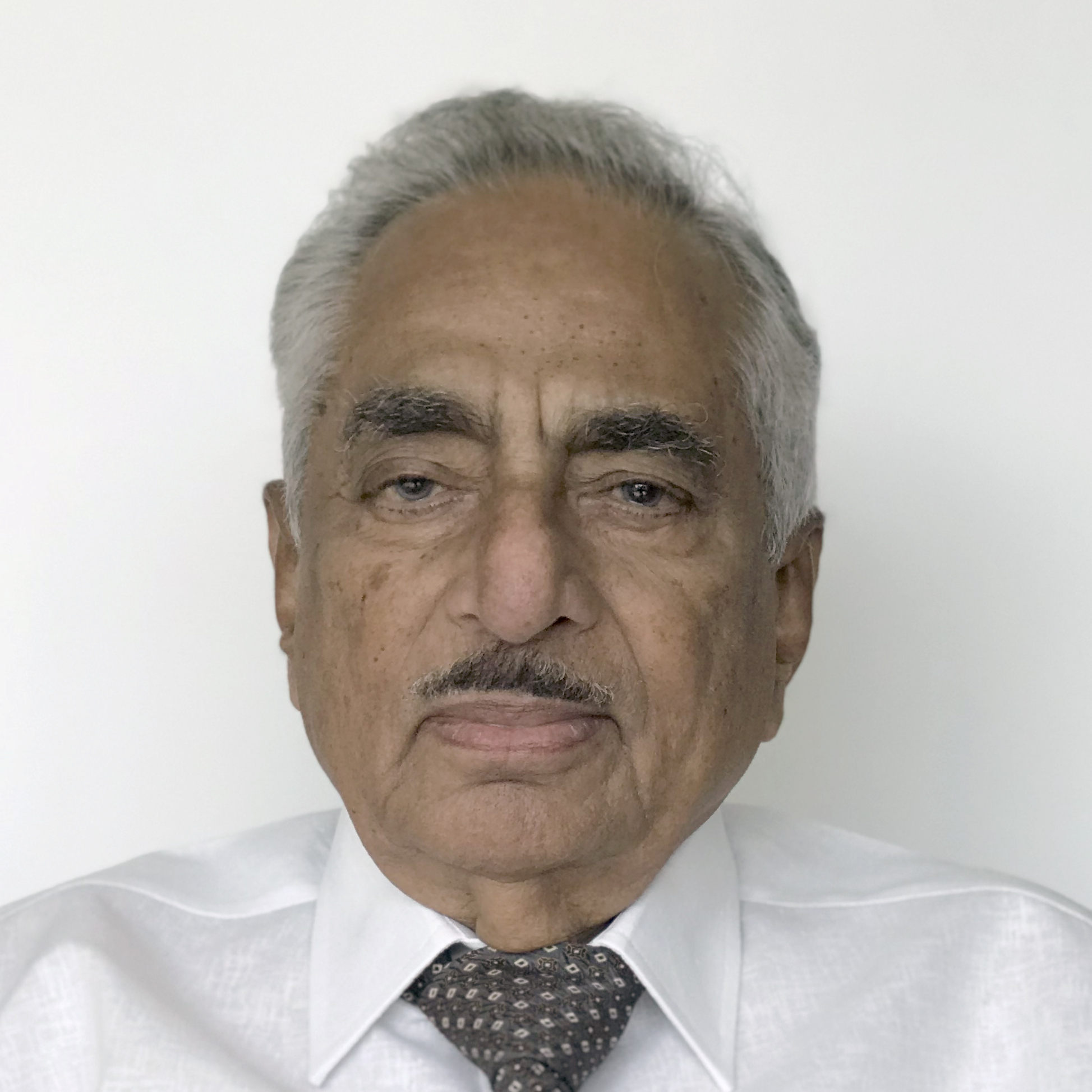
- Born: 1929 (age 96–97)
- Occupations: Architect & Civil Engineer
- Practice: I.M.K Architects
- Buildings: Nehru Centre, National Judicial Academy
- Website: Official website

Iftikhar M. Kadri (born 1929) is an Indian architect, civil engineer, and founder of I.M.K Architects in the city of Mumbai, India. He has been a key figure in contributing to landmark buildings in several cities of India, United States, Russia, Middle East, Hong Kong among others.

== Early life and education ==
I.M. Kadri was born in Ahmedabad in 1929. He attended Jamia Millia Islamia University in Delhi and completed his civil engineering degree with honours at the Engineering College of the University of Pune in 1953.

After graduating, he married Vipula Kadri a social worker from Karachi, and settled in New Delhi. He has 1 son, architect Rahul Kadri who is also the principal architect and director of IMK Architects, and 2 daughters, Isha Mehra and Mana Shetty (Sunil Shetty's wife).

== Career ==
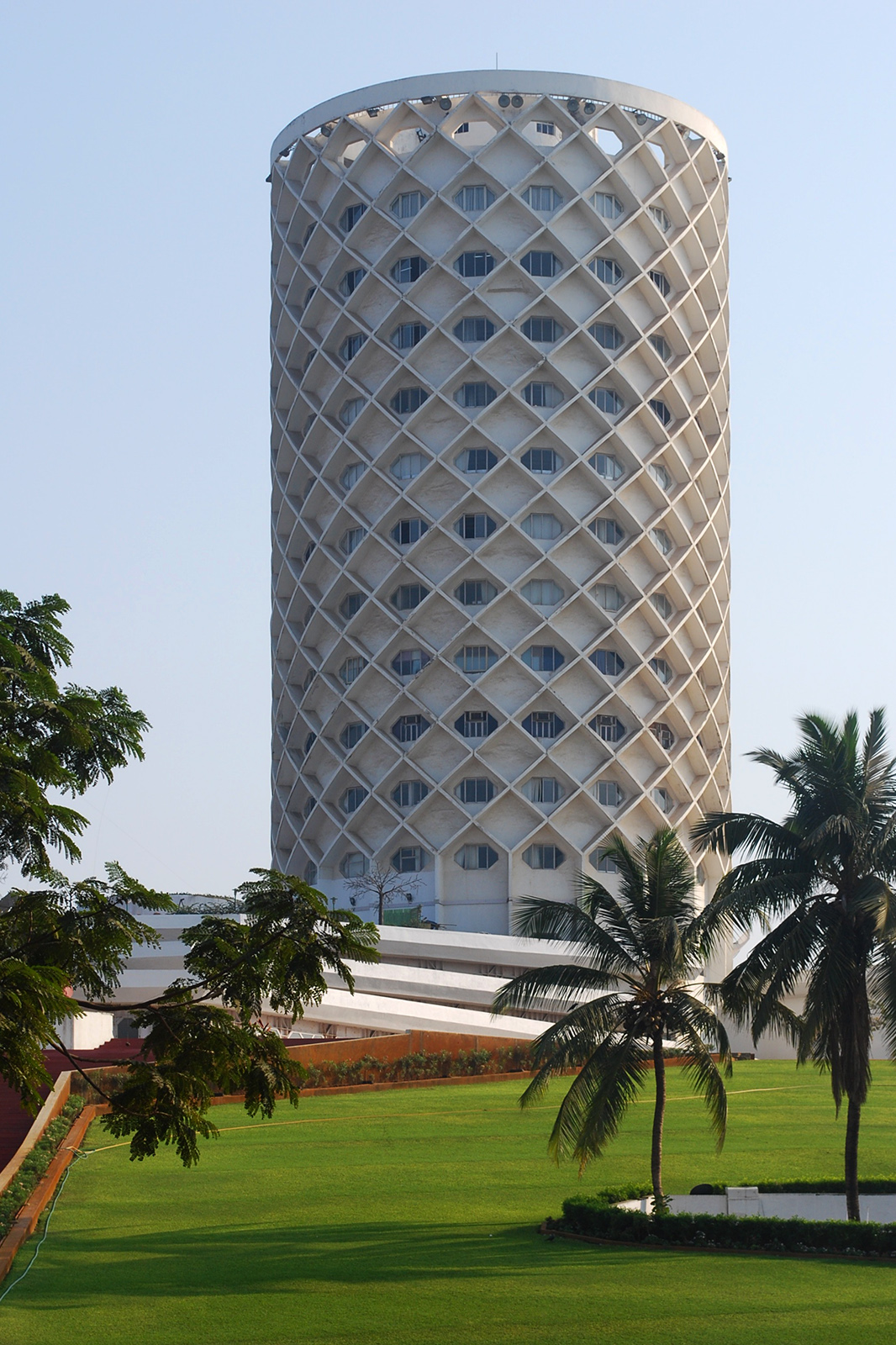
Nehru Centre

Kadri started his architectural practice I.M. Kadri Architects in 1958 in Churchgate, Mumbai. In 1971, he expanded his establishment to another company called Kadri Consultants Private Limited with its head office in Mumbai followed by branches in Bengaluru and Muscat.

In the 1960s, I.M. Kadri was selected by Hilton senior management as an architect to build the proposed Bombay Hilton hotel in Worli, Mumbai, and was sent on a world tour to study all of Hilton's hotels around the globe. However, the Bombay Hilton Hotel was never built, and instead, Kadri went on to design many Indian hotels in the 1970s and 1980s, including many Taj hotels built in that era like the Taj Mahal (Mansingh) and Taj Palace Hotels in New Delhi.

Some notable buildings designed by Kadri include the Shivsagar Estate, Nehru Center, Ceat Mahal, Happy Home and School for the Blind and Otter’s Club in Mumbai.

The Government of Maharashtra, in recognition of his extensive social work, appointed I.M. Kadri the Sheriff of Bombay for the 1994 term. The Government of Maharashtra also appointed him as a member of the Steering Committee on Slums in the year 1981, and as a member of the Executive Committee of the Bombay Metropolitan Region Development Authority in 1994.

He served as vice-president on the Board for the Citizens for Justice and Peace (CJP) formed in 2002 to promote communal harmony in India.

In 2016, Niyogi Publications published his book, The Architecture of I.M.Kadri.

=== Architectural Influences ===
At a young age, I.M. Kadri was largely influenced by the Diwan's Bungalow in which he lived. The residence had a garden, terraces and apparent interwoven visual connections, and was situated in a century-old palatial haveli in the historical quarter of Ahmedabad. Kadri cites Mughal Architecture and calligraphy as influences, which can perhaps be seen in all his projects.

== Notable projects ==
1. Brighton, Mumbai, 1959
2. Islam Gymkhana, Mumbai, 1963
3. Shivsagar Estate, Mumbai, 1967
4. Jeevan Manek for the Great Eastern Shipping Co. Ltd, Mumbai, 1968
5. Otters Club, Mumbai, 1973
6. Happy Home School for the Blind, Mumbai, 1971
7. Lake Palace Hotel, Udaipur, 1972
8. Fort Aguada Beach Resort, Goa, 1973
9. Taj Coromandel for Oriental Hotels Ltd, Chennai, 1974
10. CEAT Mahal, Mumbai, 1974
11. Hoechst House, Mumbai, 1975
12. Swapnalok, Mumbai, 1978
13. Taj Mahal (Mansingh) Hotel, New Delhi, 1979
14. Kashmir University Projects, Srinagar, 1980
15. Nehru Centre, Mumbai, 1982
16. Taj Palace Hotel, New Delhi, 1982
17. Taj Krishna Palace, Hyderabad, 1984
18. Tata Fertilizers Ltd, Babrala, 1984
19. Kowloon Mosque, Hong Kong, 1984
20. The Oberoi Hotel, Bangalore 1986 &1996
21. Haj House, Mumbai 1987
22. Haveli House, Mumbai 1989
23. Sahyadri Guest House, Mumbai 1991
24. Owaisi Teaching Hospital, Hyderabad 1996
25. Sona College of Technology, Salem 1997
26. Breach Candy Hospital & Research Centre, Mumbai 1998
27. National Judicial Academy, Bhopal 2005
28. Ramada Hotel, Dubai 2006

== Awards, Honours and Recognition ==
1. 1970, Invited by the Government of Iran to represent India in the Panel of ‘World Architect’s Conference' held in Isfahan.
2. He served as a member of the Joint Committee on Tall Building, Lehigh University, USA under UNESCO.
3. 1979, International Recognition for being included in the World Biographies of "Who's Who in the World Fourth Edition, published by Marquis Who's Who Inc., Leading Biographical Reference Publisher, Chicago.
4. 1981, The Government of Maharashtra appointed him as Member of the Steering Committee on Slums.
5. The world’s highest stained glass mural, 135 feet tall, at the Ramada Hotel in Dubai, won Kadri an entry into the Guinness Book of Records.
6. International Biographical Centre, Cambridge, England, in their Seventh Edition as "Men of Achievements".
7. 1993, The Institution of Engineers, India, awarded I.M. Kadri a citation as an Outstanding Architectural Engineer.
8. 1994, The Government of Maharashtra appointed him the Sheriff of Bombay in recognition of his extensive social work.
9. 1994, The Government of Maharashtra appointed him as a Member of the Executive Committee of the Bombay Metropolitan Region Development Authority.
10. Winner of the Best Design Award at the International Competition for the “Kowloon Mosque” in Hong Kong.
11. 2021, Awarded the Sir Mokshagundam Visvesvaraya Trophy, Lifetime Achievement Award at the 12th CIDC Vishwakarma Awards 2021.
