= Mansur Ali Khan Pataudi Memorial Lecture =

Memorial lecture

The Mansur Ali Khan Pataudi Memorial Lecture was inaugurated by the Board of Control for Cricket in India (BCCI) on 6 February 2013. It was established to honour the former Indian captain Mansur Ali Khan Pataudi, who died in 2011. The inaugural Lecture was delivered by former captain of the Indian cricket team Sunil Gavaskar on 20 February 2013, at the Taj Coromandel hotel in Chennai. The BCCI indicated that the lecture would be an annual event.

== History ==
Mansur Ali Khan was an Indian cricketer and former captain of the Indian cricket team. He was Nawab of Bhopal until 1971, when India abolished royal entitlements through the 26th Amendment to the Constitution of India. He was an Indian Cricket Cricketer of the Year in 1962, and a Wisden Cricketer of the Year in 1968. He published an autobiography, Tiger's Tale, in 1969. He was the manager of the India team in 1974–75, and referee for two Ashes Tests in 1993. He was later a member of the council of the Indian Premier League. Mr. Pataudi was admitted to New Delhi's Sir Ganga Ram Hospital on 22 September 2011 with an acute lung infection caused by chronic interstitial lung disease which prevented his lungs from exchanging oxygen properly. He died of respiratory failure the same day.

The BCCI decided to start the memorial lecture after Mr Pataudi's wife, Bollywood actress Sharmila Tagore, wrote a letter to the BCCI President N. Srinivasan. In the letter she criticised the BCCI for delaying the decision to institute the lecture. She also requested that the 2012 India-England cricket series be named after her husband. But the BCCI at that time expressed its inability to do so since the series had already been named the Anthony De Mello Trophy to honour the first BCCI secretary Anthony de Mello.

On the day of the memorial lecture's institution, the BCCI said in a press release,

"The annual lecture will be a part of the Indian Cricket season. It has been envisaged as a forum for a speaker from across the world to share his thoughts on the glorious game, as a way to help evolve it further. The audience will comprise like-minded individuals and other key stakeholders of the sport."

== First lecture ==
The inaugural Mansur Ali Khan Pataudi Memorial Lecture was delivered by former Indian cricketer Sunil Gavaskar at the Taj Coromandel hotel in Chennai on 20 February 2013. In his lecture Gavaskar spoke at length about Mr Pataudi. He praised him for improving Indian cricket, saying, "His adventurous style of play, his charisma, and his fondness for a practical joke changed how the game was played and perceived in the country." Several Indian and Australian cricketers who were part of the India-Australia cricket series were also present in the audience. Gavaskar wished the teams luck, and asked them to "introduce a smile or two to what was sure to be a hard-fought series." The lecture was broadcast live on the website bcci.tv. Gavaskar also asked the cricket administrators to give Test cricket what it truly deserves.

For various reasons, none of the family of Mansur Pataudi could attend the lecture. Mrs Tagore could not attend because of food poisoning. She later said,

"I am really very sad that I couldn't make it to Chennai for the inaugural lecture. I am suffering from severe bout of food poisoning and it became impossible for me to attend the event. I fell so ill that I have been admitted to a local nursing home. Saif is shooting for Bullet Raja while Soha is promoting her film Saheb Biwi Aur Gangster. Saba was also busy on the day with her event. So, I was the only one who was free to attend the event today but I unfortunately fell ill."

== Second lecture ==
Anil Kumble gave the second Mansur Ali Khan Pataudi Memorial Lecture on 13 November 2013 at the Crystal Room, The Taj Mahal Palace Hotel, Mumbai. The lecture was attended by members of the Pataudi family, former India captains, current and former office-bearers of the BCCI, senior representatives of the BCCI's Affiliated Units and the Indian and West Indian teams.

== Third lecture ==
Sourav Ganguly gave the third Mansur Ali Khan Pataudi Memorial Lecture on 12 November 2014 at The Taj Bengal, Kolkata.

== Fourth lecture ==
Former Indian captain Rahul Dravid gave the fourth MAK Pataudi Memorial Lecture on 1 December 2015. He spoke about the junior level of the game and the "need to invest as much energy, time and focus into India's youngest cricketers as we do for those at the elite level".

== Lecturers ==
Number	Lecturer	Year
1	Sunil Gavaskar	2013
2	Anil Kumble	2013
3	VVS Laxman	2014
4	Rahul Dravid	2015
5	Mike Brearley	2016
6	Farookh Engineer	2017
7	Kevin Pietersen	2018
8	Virender Sehwag	2019

== See also ==
- Board of Cricket Control in India
- Mansur Ali Khan Pataudi
