= Mansoor Ali Khan Pataudi =

Indian cricketer (1941–2011)

- Nawab of Pataudi

Nawab of Pataudi
- Titular: 1952–1971
- Predecessor: Iftikhar Ali Khan Pataudi

Head of the Pataudi dynasty
- Tenure: 1971–2011
- Successor: Saif Ali Khan

Head of the Bhopal Royal family
- Tenure: 1995–2011
- Successor: Saif Ali Khan
- Successor: Saba Ali Khan for the Auqaf-e-Shahi
- Born: Mohammad Mansoor Ali Khan Pataudi; 5 January 1941; Bhopal, British Raj (present-day Madhya Pradesh, India)
- Died: 22 September 2011 (aged 70); New Delhi, Delhi, India
- Burial: Pataudi Palace, Haryana, India
- Spouse: Sharmila Tagore (m. 1968)
- Issue: Saif; Saba; Soha
- House: Pataudi
- Father: Iftikhar Ali Khan
- Mother: Sajida Sultan
- Religion: Islam
- Occupation: Cricketer
- Cricket career

Cricket information
- Batting: Right-handed
- Bowling: Right-arm medium

International information
- National side: India
- Test debut (cap 104): 13 December 1961 v England
- Last Test: 23 January 1975 v West Indies

Domestic team information
- Years: Team
- 1957–1970: Sussex
- 1960–1964: Delhi
- 1965–1975: Hyderabad

Career statistics
Competition	Test	First-class
Matches	46	310
Runs scored	2,793	15,425
Batting average	34.91	33.67
100s/50s	6/16	33/75
Top score	203*	203*
Balls bowled	132	1,192
Wickets	1	10
Bowling average	88.00	77.59
5 wickets in innings	0	0
10 wickets in match	0	0
Best bowling	1/10	1/0
Catches/stumpings	27/–	208/–
- Source: ESPNcricinfo, 27 September 2011

Nawab Mohammad Mansoor Ali Khan Pataudi (also known as Mansur Ali Khan or M. A. K. Pataudi; 5 January 1941 – 22 September 2011; nicknamed Tiger Pataudi) was an Indian cricketer and a former captain of the Indian cricket team.

Pataudi was appointed India's cricket captain at the age of 21, and described as "one of (its) greatest". Pataudi was also called the "best fielder in the world" of his time by commentator John Arlott and former England captain and contemporary, Ted Dexter.

Mansur Ali Khan was the son of Iftikhar Ali Khan Pataudi, the last ruler of the princely state of Pataudi during the British Raj. After the death of his father in 1952, Pataudi succeeded him in receiving a privy purse, certain privileges, and the use of the title "Nawab of Pataudi" under terms accepted earlier when princely states were absorbed into independent India. However, all were ended in 1971 by the 26th Amendment to the Constitution of India. He received the C. K. Nayudu Lifetime Achievement Award in 2001, the highest honour bestowed by BCCI on a former player.

== Early life ==
Born in Bhopal, Mansoor Ali Khan was the son of Iftikhar Ali Khan, himself a renowned cricketer, and the Nawab Begum of Bhopal, Sajida Sultan. His uncle was Sher Ali Khan Pataudi, a Major-General in Pakistan Army. His maternal grandfather, Hamidullah Khan, was the last ruling Nawab of Bhopal, and his aunt, Abida Sultan, was the princess of Bhopal. Kaikhusrau Jahan, the Begum of Bhopal, was his great-grandmother, and Shahryar Khan, the chairman of the Pakistan Cricket Board, and the cricketer Ashiq Hussain Qureshi, were his maternal cousins. He was the former Nawab of Bhopal State and Pataudi State. The Pataudi family traces their origin to Faiz Talab Khan, an ethnic Pashtun from the Barech tribe of Kandahar, Afghanistan, who became the first Nawab of the Pataudi State in 1804.

He was educated at Minto Circle in Aligarh and Welham Boys' School in Dehradun (Uttarakhand), Lockers Park Prep School in Hertfordshire (where he was coached by Frank Woolley), and Winchester College (Kingsgate House, known as Beloe's). He read Arabic and French at Balliol College, Oxford.

His father died while playing polo in Delhi on Mansoor's eleventh birthday in 1952, whereupon Mansoor succeeded him as the ninth Nawab. Although the princely state of Pataudi had been merged with India after the end of the British Raj in 1947, he held the title until the entitlements were abolished by the Government of India through the 26th amendment to the constitution in 1971.

== Cricketing career ==
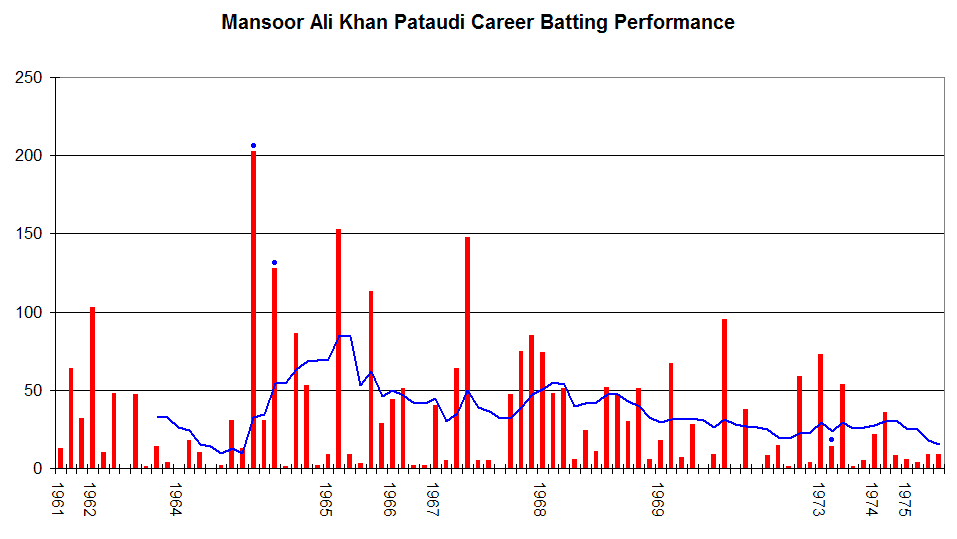
Mansoor Ali Khan Pataudi's career performance graph.

Pataudi Jr., as Mansoor came to be known during his cricket career, was a right-handed batsman and a right-arm medium pace bowler. He was a schoolboy batting prodigy at Winchester, relying on his keen eyes to punish the bowling. He captained the school team in 1959, scoring 1,068 runs that season, beating the school record set in 1919 by Douglas Jardine. He also won the public schools rackets championship, with partner Christopher Snell.

He made his first-class debut for Sussex in August 1957, aged 16, and also played for Oxford while he was at university and was the first Indian captain there. On 1 July 1961, he was a passenger in a car, driven by teammate Robin Waters, which was involved in an accident in Hove. A shard of glass from the broken windscreen penetrated and permanently damaged his right eye. A surgeon named Dr. David St Clair Roberts was called to operate on his eye, and was praised by Pataudi for saving one of his eyes. The damage caused Pataudi to see a doubled image, and it was feared this would end his cricketing career, but Pataudi was soon in the nets, learning to play with one eye.

Despite his eye injury less than six months before, he made his Test debut playing against England in Delhi in December 1961. He found it easiest to play with his cap pulled down over his damaged right eye. He scored 103 in the Fifth Test in Madras, helping India to its first series win against England. He was appointed vice-captain for the tour to the West Indies in 1962. In March 1962, Pataudi became captain of the Indian cricket team after the sitting captain, Nari Contractor, was ruled out of the Fourth Test in Barbados due to an injury sustained by Contractor batting against Charlie Griffith in a tour match against Barbados. At 21 years and 77 days, he held the world record for the youngest Test captain until he was surpassed by Zimbabwe's Tatenda Taibu in May 2004 and later by Afghanistan's Rashid Khan in September 2019. As of November 2022, he remains the youngest Indian Test captain and third youngest International Test captain worldwide.

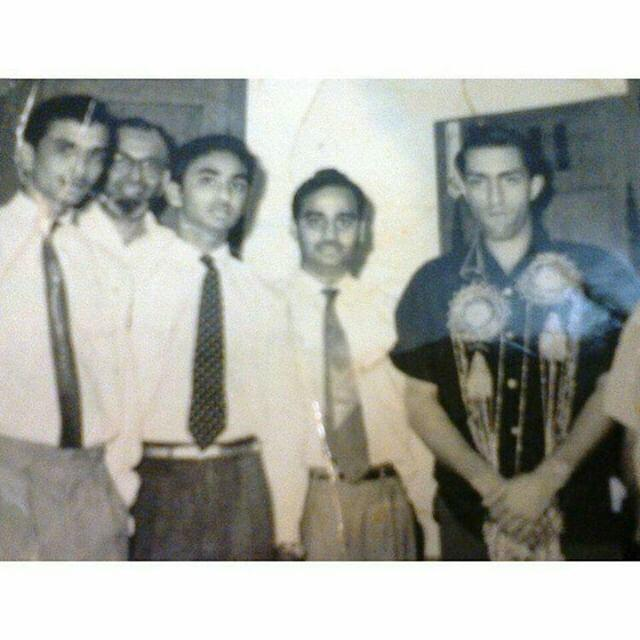
Pataudi (right) with Nawabzada Khursheed and Mohammad Khan of Pathari

He played in 46 Test matches for India between 1961 and 1975, scoring 2,793 runs at a Test batting average of 34.91, including 6 Test centuries. Pataudi was captain of the Indian cricket team in 40 of his 46 matches, only 9 of which resulted in victory for his team, with 19 defeats and 19 draws. His victories included India's first ever Test match win overseas against New Zealand in 1968. India went on to win that series, making it India's first ever Test series win overseas. He lost the captaincy of the Indian cricket team for the tour to the West Indies in 1970–1, and did not play Tests from 1970 to 1972. He returned to the India side captained by Ajit Wadekar in 1973, for the Third Test against England, and captained India against West Indies in 1974–5, but was finally dropped as a player in 1975.

Between 1957 and 1970 Pataudi, following his countrymen Ranjitsinhji and Duleepsinhji, played 137 first class matches for Sussex County Cricket Club scoring 3,054 runs at an average of 22.29. He captained Sussex in 1966. In India, he played first-class cricket for Delhi in the North Zone until 1966, and then for Hyderabad in the South Zone.

He was an Indian Cricket Cricketer of the Year in 1962, and a Wisden Cricketer of the Year in 1968. He published an autobiography, Tiger's Tale, in 1969. He was the manager of the India team in 1974–5, and referee for two Ashes Tests in 1993. He was later a member of the council of the Indian Premier League. In 2007, in commemoration of the 75th anniversary of India's Test debut, the Marylebone Cricket Club has commissioned a trophy for Test match series between India and England which was named the Pataudi Trophy in honour of his father, the 8th Nawab.

Pataudi holds the record for facing the most balls in a single test match when batting at number six position in Test history (554).

== Political career ==
Pataudi also contested the Lok Sabha elections from the Gurgaon constituency in 1971 under the Vishal Haryana party, he came third and lost to Tayyab Husain earning a total of 22,979 votes. He later congratulated Chaudhary Rahim Khan with an elephant ride for defeating Hussain in the Lok Sabha elections from the Faridabad constituency in 1984. He contested the Lok Sabha elections unsuccessfully again from the Bhopal constituency in 1991 as the nominee of the Congress party, and came second.

== Personal life ==
Mansoor Ali Khan was in a steady relationship with Simi Garewal. Simi admitted in an email interview that she was dating Mansoor and that he came to visit her on the sets of Teen Devian, in Avijit Ghosh's book, 40 Retakes: Bollywood Classics You May Have Missed. He broke up with her after he met Sharmila Tagore, whom he married on 27 December 1968. They had three children: Saif Ali Khan (b. 1970), a Bollywood actor, Saba Ali Khan (b. 1976), a jewellery designer, and Soha Ali Khan (b. 1978), a Bollywood actress and TV personality. The actress Kareena Kapoor Khan is his daughter-in-law, and the actors Sara Ali Khan and Ibrahim Ali Khan are his grandchildren from his former daughter-in-law Amrita Singh. Actor Kunal Khemu is his son-in-law.

=== 2003 Poaching case ===
Pataudi was arrested in October 2003 over the poaching of a blackbuck and two hares, but was released on bail. The case went on for nine years, and in January 2015, four years after his death, six people were convicted. This case is unrelated to the other blackbuck poaching case of Salman Khan that his son Saif Ali Khan Pataudi was involved in.

=== Death ===
Pataudi was admitted to Sir Ganga Ram Hospital in Rajendra Nagar, Central Delhi on 25 August 2011 with an acute lung infection caused by chronic interstitial lung disease which prevented his lungs from exchanging oxygen properly. He died on 22 September 2011 due to respiratory failure. He is buried in Pataudi, Gurgaon district, Haryana.

== Awards and recognitions ==
- 1964 Arjuna Award
- 1967 Padma Shri
- 2001 C. K. Nayudu Award

In honour of his outstanding contributions towards cricket, the Mansur Ali Khan Pataudi Memorial Lecture was instituted by the BCCI on 6 February 2013 with the inaugural lecture by Sunil Gavaskar on 20 February 2013. In May 2016, the Sports complex building of Jamia Millia Islamia was named after him.

Preceded by Iftikhar Ali Khan	Nawab of Pataudi; 1952–1971	Succeeded by Title abolished in 1971
Sporting positions
Preceded by Nari Contractor	Indian National Test Cricket Captain; 1961/62–1967/68	Succeeded by Chandu Borde
Preceded by Chandu Borde	Indian National Test Cricket Captain; 1967/68–1969/70	Succeeded by Ajit Wadekar
Preceded by Ajit Wadekar	Indian National Test Cricket Captain; 1974/75–1974/75 (1 Test Match)	Succeeded by Srinivasaraghavan Venkataraghavan
Preceded by Srinivasaraghavan Venkataraghavan	Indian National Test Cricket Captain; 1974/75–1974/75	Succeeded by Sunil Gavaskar
Preceded by Ted Dexter	Sussex county cricket captain 1966	Succeeded by J.M. Parks
Preceded by Ajit Wadekar	Indian national cricket coach 1974/75	Succeeded by Bishen Singh Bedi
