= Pataudi Palace =

Building in Haryana, India

Coordinates: 28.322°N 76.783°E

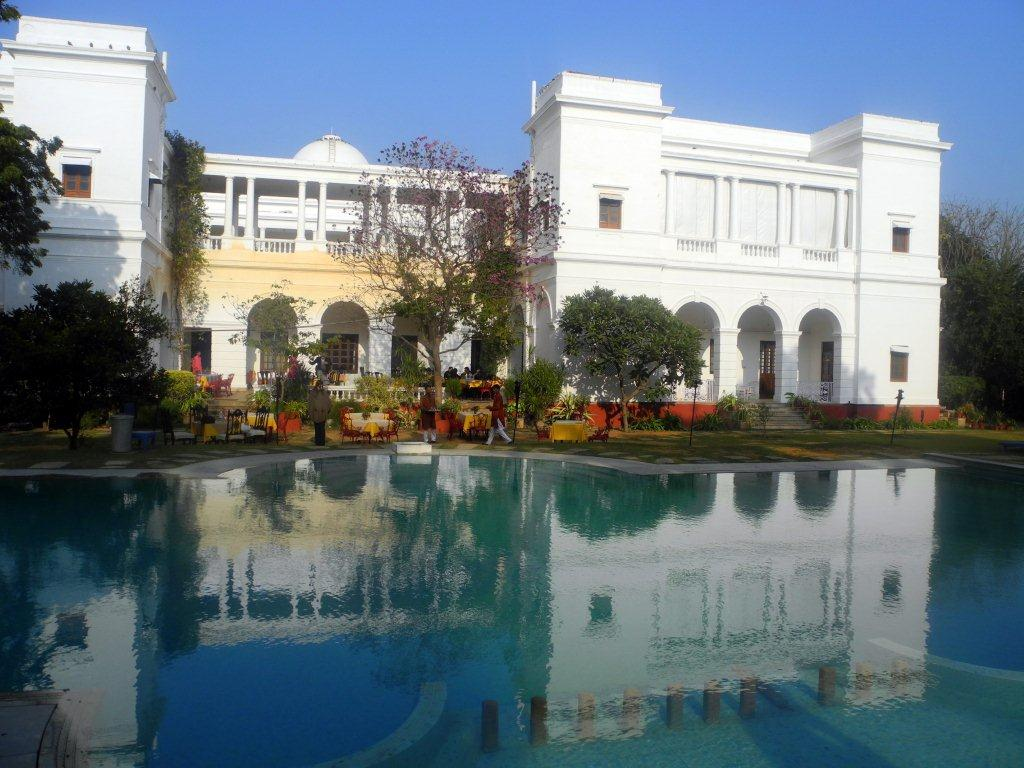
- Interactive map of the Pataudi Palace area

General information
- Location: Pataudi, Gurugram, Haryana
- Completed: 1935
- Client: Iftikhar Ali Khan
- Owner: Saif Ali Khan
- Operator: Pataudi family

Design and construction
- Architect: Robert Tor Russell assisted by Karl Molt Von Heinz
- Engineer: Dilip Kumar (Note: not to be confused with actor Dilip Kumar)

The Pataudi Palace, also called Ibrahim Kothi, is a palace of the former ruling Pataudi family, in the Pataudi town of the Gurgaon district in Haryana, India. Passed from the last ruling nawab, Iftikhar Ali Khan, to his son, the last recognized titular nawab, Mansoor Ali Khan, the palace is currently held by his son Saif Ali Khan, who is the current patriarch of the Pataudi family. Spread over 10 acres, the palace has 150 rooms, including dressing rooms, bedrooms, and billiard rooms.

== History ==
After the high-profile wedding between the Nawab of Pataudi and the Begum of Bhopal, the nawab felt the old family home was not grand enough to house his new bride in the manner she was accustomed. At the request of Iftikhar Ali Khan (1910–52), the 8th Nawab of Pataudi, the building was designed in the style of the colonial-era mansions of Imperial Delhi by Robert Tor Russell (1888–1972) assisted by the Karl Malte von Heinz. Many films and TV series have been shot in the palace, including Veer Zara, Rang De Basanti, Eat, Pray, Love,Mangal Pandey, Gandhi My Father, Mere Brother Ki Dulhan, Tandav, .

It was repossessed by actor Saif Ali Khan, son of the last Nawab in 2014 and as of July 2015, the palace remained closed for renovations. The renovation was soon completed and the Pataudi family stays in the palace during winters.

Nearby Akbar Manzil, built after 1857 as the official residence of the then Nawab, was later converted into a judicial complex.

== See also ==
- Pataudi State
