= BGR-34 =

Ayurvedic drug in India that supposedly treats Diabetes mellitus type 2

BGR-34 (Blood Glucose Regulator-34) is an Ayurvedic-derived product that is sold in India as an over-the-counter pill for the management of type 2 diabetes. It was developed in 2015 by two government-owned laboratories and launched commercially in 2016. It has been tested in only one, modest-sized, human trial. The drug has been heavily criticized, and without more clinical trials, its efficacy remains unproven. The manufacturers have refused to acknowledge the claims of inefficacy and other concerns.

== Development ==
BGR-34 was co-developed by two national government-owned laboratories, National Botanical Research Institute (NBRI) and Central Institute for Medicinal and Aromatic Plants (CIMAP) under the patronage of the Council of Scientific and Industrial Research (CSIR). The formulation was publicized in September 2015 as NBRMAP-DB and it was launched commercially by AIMIL Pharmaceuticals (AIMIL) in June 2016. Upon launch, it was priced at ₹5 (0.07 USD) per 500 milligram tablet, which was to be consumed twice a day. CSIR has claimed BGR-34 to be the first Indian ayurvedic anti-diabetic drug and the laboratories were awarded the CSIR Technology Award in 2016 in the Life Sciences category.

== Ingredients ==
The raw materials for BGR-34 are derived from six plants: Daruharidra (Berberis aristata), giloy (Tinospora cordifolia), vijaysar (Pterocarpus marsupium), gudmar (Gymnema sylvestre), manjeestha (Rubia cordifolia) and fenugreek (methi). They were claimed to have been chosen from an "in-depth study of over 500 renowned ancient herbs".

== Medical claims ==
The formulation purportedly releases 34 active phytoconstituents, which work as DPP-4 Inhibitors to regulate blood glucose levels. CSIR claimed high clinical efficacy in multiple clinical and animal trials. CSIR also asserted that the drug had several side-benefits and that it can stave off dependency on insulin or other anti-diabetic medications. The product has been advertised as being free from side-effects.

A placebo-controlled clinical trial in one of CSIR's Ayurvedic hospitals involving 64 enrolled subjects (56 completed the trial) was uploaded to Clinical Trials Registry of India (CTRI) and subsequently published in European Journal of Pharmaceutical and Medical Research, a predatory journal. One summary of the trial did not show any statistical analysis but minimally asserted that the trial "show(ed) promising results" and that in light of the "significant improvement in the feeling of wellbeing, it should be further extensively used as a monotherapy/adjunctive therapy". The trial's results were publicized by a group of researchers – five from AIMIL and three doctors from the hospital – in a November-2017 conference held by the OMICS Publishing Group under the ConferenceSeries banner. OMICS is a predatory publisher with little to non-existent quality-control and their conferences have been subject to equivalent criticism. The researchers then published the same trial in a different journal: Journal of Traditional and Complementary Medicine, wherein BGR-34 was described as successful in lowering fasting blood glucose, postprandial glucose and glycosylated haemoglobin.

== Reception ==
Upon its launch as a scientifically validated drug, which was supposedly approved by the Ministry of AYUSH, multiple media outlets deemed it favourable, and termed it to be a "breakthrough-drug", especially in light of its low price. At the ceremony of the platinum jubilee of CSIR, Prime Minister Narendra Modi mentioned the drug as an achievement of the institution.

=== Criticism ===
BGR-34 was the subject of criticism from multiple quarters. There was a prolonged absence of any published clinical trial(s) of the drug and the claims of its efficacy could not be verified. No publications in peer-reviewed journals about scientific research undertaken into the aspects of contraindication, toxicology and other problems could be located either. Despite being branded as an ayurvedic product, there was no patent application at the National Botanical Research Institute (NBRI) corpus or the Intellectual property in India portal. The claims that BGR-34 was less costly than equivalent allopathic drugs were also determined to be misleading.

Physicians noted concerns about the safety of the drug, multiple side-effects were reported and it was widely described as inefficient.

In October 2016, the Advertising Standards Council of India banned an advertisement for BGR-34 that claimed of "curing Type 2 Diabetes Mellitus without any side effects". It held the advertisement to violate the Drugs & Magic Remedies Act by offering to cure an incurable disease and under the purview of disseminating unsubstantiated claims without any corresponding data. Mohan Nair, a pharmaceutical scientist and advisor to the National Task Force on Phyto-pharmaceuticals, expressed his concern about exposing the populace to a drug that is not validated by a trial and about the potential harm to the credibility of CSIR. Sankaran Valiathan, chairman of the Task Force on Ayurvedic Biology of the Department of Science and Technology, criticized the CSIR for making unsubstantiated claims and releasing a drug without evaluating its safety and efficacy. Shailaja Chandra, former Secretary, Department of AYUSH, mentioned the potential of the affair to bring Ayurveda and the research into it into disrepute. Avinash Bhondwe, senior vice-president of the Indian Medical Association said there was an absence of any comprehensive clinical study on most AYUSH drugs and urged the Central Drugs Standard Control Organization (FDA) to take measures.

In criticism not specific to BGR-34, an editorial described the boom of alternative therapies for diabetes in India as hype and pointed to multiple systemic reviews that highlighted several methodological problems with the studies and trials conducted by AYUSH and its associates. It also criticized the ICMR guidelines that waived or relaxed the rules for rigorous pharmacological and toxicology studies for Ayurvedic products provided they were "prepared in same way as mentioned in ancient Ayurvedic treatises". Another paper was critical of these unproven therapies for curing or managing diabetes and noted the practices to be non-safe and non-efficient; despite a huge popularity among the masses. It also advocated for guidelines derived from clinical trial outcomes and that stricter regulations need to be enforced on CAM practices to ensure their safety and effectiveness.

In an article in Journal of Ayurveda and Integrative Medicine, Bhushan Patwardhan criticized the Government regulations in these areas as lackadaisical and held it to be unsatisfactory in ensuring the non-exploitation of the broader populace. He also noted a long-prevalent pattern of the CSIR investing efforts into launching multiple drugs with obscure scientific credentials that often fizzled out after a gala launch and described it to be primarily inept with a potential to erode the credibility of Indian traditions and knowledge heritage. He also said many senior scientists from CSIR were sceptical of such "populistic and market driven propaganda" and that the preference for undertaking scientific research by the means of media headlines rather than by publications in credible scientific journals was worrying. The concerns have been echoed in other quarters with some noting the fund-crunch as the motivation for performing such shoddy but commercializable research.

Consumer reviews have been mixed and a court-case has been lodged to stall the sale of the drug.

==== Response ====
Despite longstanding concerns and criticism, the CSIR has continued to call BGR-34 a revolutionary innovation. CIMAP director Anil Kumar Tripathi blamed the initial vacuum of scientific data as to the procedural rule that mandated the publication of any scientific paper disclosing the content of the patent, only after six months of the filing. Girish Sahni, Director General of CSIR in 2018, said the drug "is matching the efficacy level of any branded modern medicine in controlling the sugar level", and the Union Science and Technology Ministry praised it as a major achievement of CSIR under the Modi government. Harsh Vardhan, Minister for Science & Technology has claimed of the drug being well received by people and that it has been proven to significantly reduce blood glucose levels.

In response to a question in the Rajya Sabha, Shripad Naik, Union Minister of State for Ministry of AYUSH said BGR-34 was "scientifically tested and very effective in treating type 2 Diabetes" and that the drug has been successful. In contrast, in an interview to The Wire, outgoing secretary of the AYUSH ministry, Ajit M. Sharan rejected AIMIL's claim of being ''approved by Ministry of AYUSH'' and noted that the ministry was not any involved in the affairs. There has been aggressive marketing of the drug and it has been even inducted into the Anti-Diabetes Campaigns by central and state authorities.

== Similar drugs ==
=== Anti-diabetic ===
Multiple anti-diabetic ayurvedic drugs have been developed and licensed to private industries for production along the same lines. Central Council for Research in Ayurvedic Sciences (CCRAS), an autonomous body of the Ministry of AYUSH, developed a second drug for diabetes called AYUSH-82, containing four herbal ingredients; karela (Momordica charantia), jamun (Syzygium cumini), amra (Spondias mombin) and gudmar (Gymnema sylvestre) along with shilajit. CCRAS scientists said it permanently cures type-II diabetes within six months and that it has no side-effects. The distribution and manufacturing rights were granted to Kudos laboratories, which subsequently re-branded it as IME9. Similar criticisms about an absence of rigorous pharmacological studies and a lack of meaningful clinical trials, coupled with publications in dubious predatory journals were noted.

=== Others ===
The ministry of AYUSH, CSIR and other national laboratories have been subject to similar criticism for the development cum aggressive advocacy and commercialization of multiple products and treatment-regimes for a variety of other diseases including dengue, chikungunya, swine flu, asthma, autism, malaria, AIDS, and cancer despite a near-similar absence of rigorous pharmacological studies and/or meaningful clinical trials.

At least one drug (AYUSH-64) has been proved to be drastically inefficient in a clinical trial held by independent researchers.
