= CRIUM, Hyderabad =

Health institute in Hyderabad, India

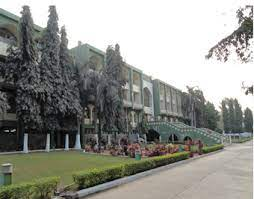
Central Research Institute of Unani Medicine (CRIUM), in Hyderabad.

Central Research Institute of Unani Medicine or CRIUM Hyderabad, established in December 1971, is an Indian Government-sponsored Unani medicine research center and out-patient clinic located in Hyderabad, India. The institute was upgraded to National Research Institute of Unani Medicine for Skin Disorders (NRIUMSD), by Shripad Naik, Minister of State (IC) for AYUSH in November 2019. The Institute is well known for its successful treatment in the skin condition of vitiligo, treating more than 150,000 patients.

== Overview ==
The Central Research institute of Unani Medicine (CRIUM), now National Research Institute of Unani Medicine for Skin Disorders (NRIUMSD), Hyderabad is a decentralized institute functioning under the Central Council for Research in Unani Medicine (CCRUM), Department of Ayurveda, Yoga & Naturopathy, Unani, Siddha and Homoeopathy (AYUSH), Ministry of Health and Family Welfare, Government of India. It was established in December, 1971 under the erstwhile Central Council for Research Indian Medicine and Homeopathy (CCRIMH), which was set up in 1969. On the split of the CCRIUMH into four independent Councils in 1978, the CRIUM, Hyderabad continued functioning under the CCRUM) with the objective of undertaking scientific research on various aspects of Unani system of medicine. The institute was upgraded to National Research Institute of Unani Medicine for Skin Disorders, by Shripad Yesso Naik, Minister of State (IC) for AYUSH in November 2019. The institute has a good infrastructure consisting of a Research Out-patient Department (ROPD) and a General Out-patient Department (GOPD), a 50-bed In-patient Department (IPD), Biochemistry, Pathology, Physiology Laboratories, Drug Standardization Research Unit, Survey and Cultivation of Medicinal Plants Unit and a Mobile Clinical Research Unit, besides Radiology, Static's and Medical Record Sections and a Reference Library.

The CRIUM, Hyderabad has been awarded the ISO 9001:2008 certification. The pharmacy at the institute has a Good Manufacturing Practices (GMP) certificate for manufacture of research and other drugs. Recently, Institute's hospital has been accredited by National Accreditation Board for Hospitals & Healthcare Providers (NABH) for AYUSH Hospitals. It is the first NABH accredited Unani hospital functioning under the Central Council for Research in Unani Medicine (CCRUM).

The Institute offers Postgraduate Courses with 14 seats in two disciplines of Unani Medicine, namely, Moalajat (Medicine)-09 seats and Ilmul Advia (Pharmacology)-09 seats since 2016. The Institute is affiliated to Kaloji Narayana Rao University of Health Sciences (KNRUHS), Warangal, Telangana State and follows the curriculum prescribed by Central Council of Indian Medicine (CCIM) as approved by the KNRUHS. In 2016 the institute announced that it would offer PhD courses in collaboration with Jamia Millia Islamia.

== Objectives ==
- To achieve the target of Clinical Trials in given sample in stipulated time.
- To project and disseminate research work of CRIUM, Hyderabad as publications in National and International journals and conferences as well as compilation of Monographs on Clinical Projects.
- To standardize single and compound drugs of proven efficacy including SOP, for such drugs.
- Ethno Botanical Survey, collection, experimental and large scale cultivation of Unani Medicinal Plants.

== Research ==
Research Projects under progress at this Institute involve diseases like Vitiligo, Chronic Sinusitis, Psoriasis, Hyperlipidemia, Chronic Stable Angina, Chronic Duodenal Ulcer, Hepatitis, Diabetes Mellitus, Essential Hypertension and a study on Immunomodulators, health and vitality promoters among aged. The areas of Research Programmes Undertaken by the institute are Clinical Research Programme, Fundamental Research, Pharmacological Research, General OPD Programme, Mobile Clinical Research Programme, School Health Programme, Drug Standardization Research Programme, Survey and Cultivation of Medical Plants Programme, Collaborative Studies.

== See also ==
- Ministry of AYUSH
- Government Nizamia General Hospital
- Hamdard (Wakf) Laboratories
- Government Unani and Ayurvedic Degree College and Hospital
- Tipu Sultan Unani Medical College
