= Doctor of Medicine =

Postgraduate medical degree

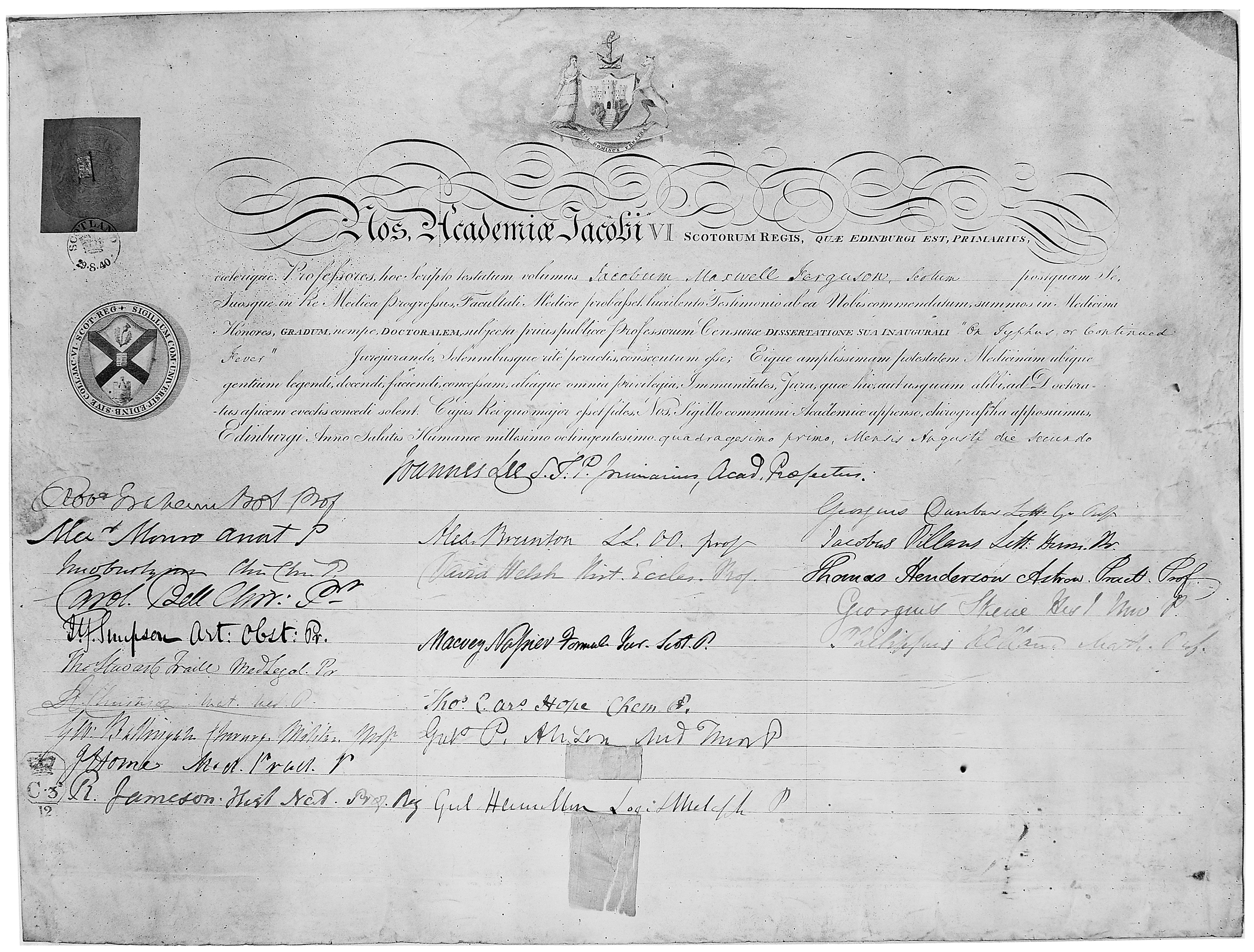
M.D. diploma conferred on James Maxwell Ferguson by the University of Edinburgh in 1841

A Doctor of Medicine (abbreviated M.D. or MD, from the Latin Medicinae Doctor or Dr med., from the inverse construction) is a medical degree, the meaning of which varies between different jurisdictions. In the United States, and some other countries, the MD denotes a professional degree of physician. This generally arose because many in 18th-century medical professions trained in Scotland, which used the MD degree nomenclature. In England, however, Bachelor of Medicine, Bachelor of Surgery (MBBS) was used: in the 19th century, it became the standard in Scotland too. Thus, in the United Kingdom, Ireland and other countries, the MD is a research doctorate, honorary doctorate or applied clinical degree restricted to those who already hold a professional degree (Bachelor's/Master's/Doctoral) in medicine. In those countries, the equivalent professional degree to the North American, and some others' usage of MD is still typically titled Bachelor of Medicine, Bachelor of Surgery.

== History ==
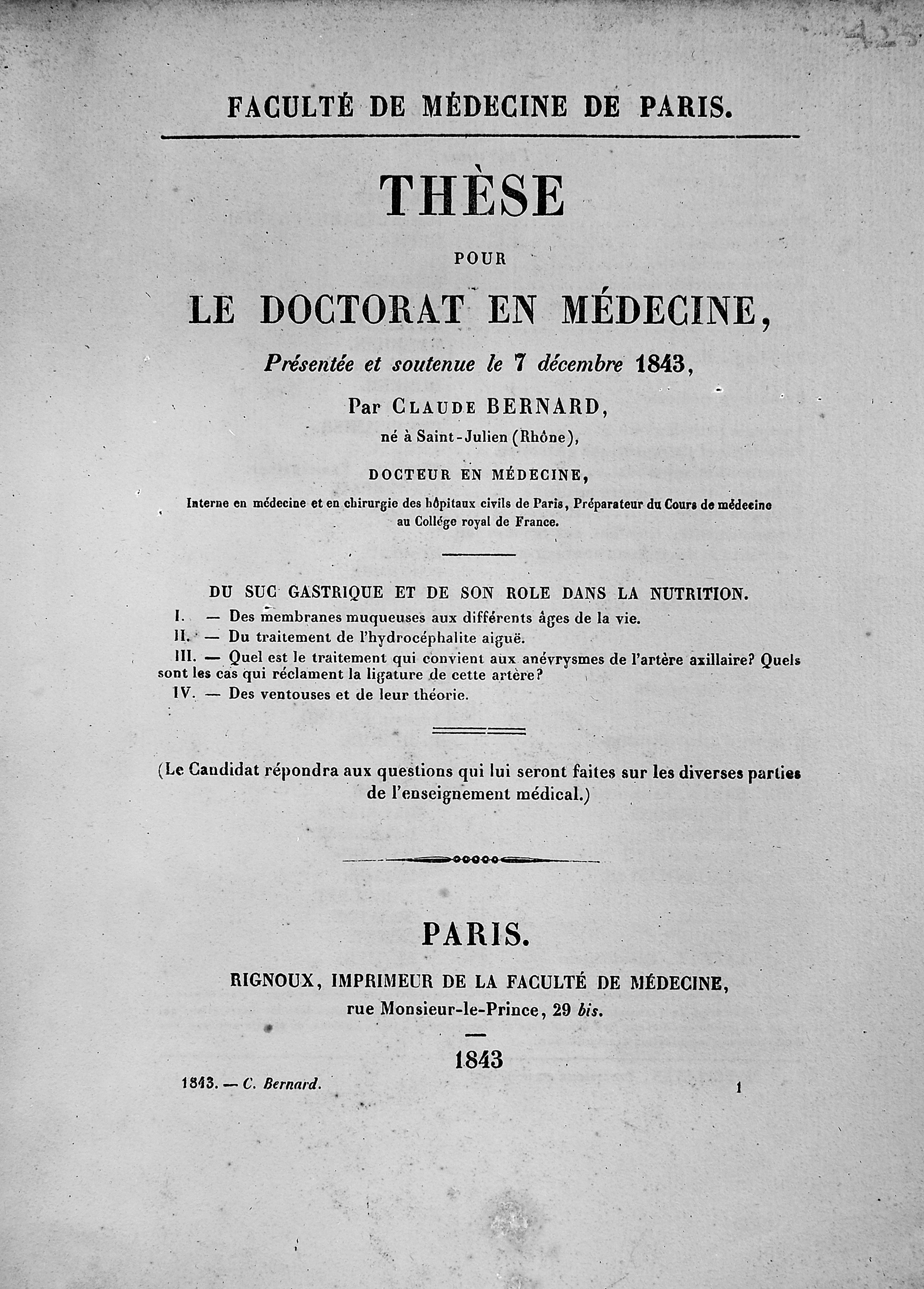
The thesis presented by Claude Bernard to obtain his doctorate of medicine (1843)

The first medical degrees were awarded by the Schola Medica Salernitana around the year 1000, including to women such as Trota of Salerno. The degrees received legal sanction in 1137 by Roger II of Sicily and in 1231 by Emperor Federico II, in the Constitution of Melfi. In the titles XLIV-LXXXIX of the third book of the Constitutions of 1231, it was established that the activity of a physician (medicus) could only be carried out by physicians holding a medical degree, the Licentia Medendi (license to medicine), by the Schola Medica Salernitana (the only school in the kingdom authorized to award degrees in medicine). This degree was awarded after a curriculum composed of three years of study of logic, five years of medical studies, an examination of a commission composed of the professors of the university, a one-year apprenticeship with an expert doctor, and a final examination before the commissioners of the Royal Curia and the Provincial Curias.

In 1703, the University of Glasgow's first medical graduate, Samuel Benion, was issued with the academic degree of Doctor of Medicine.

University medical education in England culminated with the MB qualification, and in Scotland the MD, until in the mid-19th century the public bodies who regulated medical practice at the time required practitioners in Scotland as well as England to hold the dual Bachelor of Medicine and Bachelor of Surgery degrees (MB BS/MBChB/MB BChir/BM BCh etc.). North American medical schools switched to the tradition of the ancient universities of Scotland and began granting the MD title rather than the MB beginning in the late 18th century. The Columbia University College of Physicians and Surgeons in New York (which at the time was referred to as King's College of Medicine) was the first American university to grant the MD degree instead of the MB.

Early medical schools in North America that granted the Doctor of Medicine degrees were Columbia, Penn, Harvard, Maryland, and McGill. These first few North American medical schools that were established were (for the most part) founded by physicians and surgeons who had been trained in England and Scotland.

In most countries having a Doctor of Medicine degree does not mean that the individual will be allowed to practice medicine. Typically a physician must go through a year of general medical education in a hospital as an intern and then a residency for at least three years in a specific field of medicine and then take some form of licensing examination in their jurisdiction. Medical occupational licensing was found to increase the time required to allow practicing medicine and increase medical education costs.

A feminine form, "Doctress of Medicine" or Medicinae Doctrix, was also used by the New England Female Medical College in Boston in the 1860s.

== By country ==
=== First professional degrees ===
==== Afghanistan ====
In Afghanistan, medical education begins after high school. No pre-medicine courses or bachelor's degree are required. Eligibility is determined through the rank applicants obtain in the public university entrance exam held every year throughout the country. Entry to medical school is competitive, and only students with the highest ranks are accepted into medical programs. The primary medical degree is completed in 7 years. According to the new medical curriculum (from 2016), during the 12th semester, medical students must complete research on a medical topic and provide a thesis as part of their training. Students also undergo a one-year compulsory internship, to be completed in a teaching hospital. Medical graduates are awarded a certificate in general medicine, regarded as "MD" and validated by the "Ministry of Higher Education of Afghanistan". All physicians are to obtain licensing and a medical council registration number from the "Ministry of Public Health" before they officially begin to practice. They may subsequently specialize in a specific medical field at medical schools offering the necessary qualifications. After graduation, students may complete residency.

Before the civil wars in Afghanistan, medical education used to be taught by foreign professors or Afghan professors who studied medical education abroad. The Kabul medical institute certified the students as "Master of Medicine". After the civil wars, medical education changed extensively, and the MD certification has been reduced to "Medicine Bachelor".

==== Argentina ====
In Argentina, the First Degree of Physician or Physician Diplomate (Spanish: Título de Médico) is equivalent to the North American MD Degree with six years of intensive studies followed by usually three or four years of residency as a major specialty in a particular empiric field, consisting of internships, social services and sporadic research. Only by holding a Medical Title can the postgraduate student apply for the Doctor degree through a doctorate in medicine program approved by the National Commission for University Evaluation and Accreditation.

==== Armenia ====
In Armenia, medical studies take six years. After completing high school, students can apply to one of the country's medical universities. The application process includes an admission examination testing the applicant in biology, chemistry, and physics. The six-year medical education course is a combined bachelor's and master's degree program. The first three years consist of lecture courses while the final three years consist of education in clinical settings alongside attending physicians. Medical students may also simultaneously study for a Master of Public Health if they wish, which takes one and a half years of study. After the six-year period of study, students must pass the state medical examination to graduate. They must then undergo a period of residency training in their chosen field of practice, the duration of which lasts from one to four years.

==== Australia ====
Historically, Australian medical schools have followed the British tradition by conferring the degrees of Bachelor of Medicine and Bachelor of Surgery (MBBS) to its graduates whilst reserving the title of Doctor of Medicine (MD) for their research training degree, analogous to the PhD, or for their higher or honorary doctorates. Although the majority of Australian MBBS degrees have been graduate programs since the 1990s, under the previous Australian Qualifications Framework (AQF) they remained categorized as Level 7 Bachelor's degrees together with other undergraduate programs.

The latest version of the AQF includes the new category of Level 9 Master's (Extended) degrees which permits the use of the term 'Doctor' in the styling of the degree title of relevant professional programs. As a result, various Australian medical schools have replaced their MBBS degrees with the MD to resolve the previous anomalous nomenclature. With the introduction of the Master's level MD, universities have also renamed their previous medical research doctorates. The University of Melbourne was the first to introduce the MD in 2011 as a basic medical degree, and has renamed its research degree to Doctor of Medical Science (DMedSc).

Australian National University offers a Doctor of Medicine and Surgery (MChD, abbreviated from Medicinae ac Chirurgiae Doctoranda) which is also a 4-year extended master's degree that qualifies graduates to be medical practitioners like with a MD or MBBS.

==== Austria ====
In Austria, medical studies (medicine or dentistry) take six years full-time. In medicine, the first two years comprise basic fields of medicine such as anatomy, biology, chemistry, physics, physiology, etc., the next three years consist of all medical fields in the narrower sense with frequent bedside training and medical traineeships while the sixth and last year is dedicated solely to working in a clinic. After this, a specific six-year training (e.g. in internal medicine, paediatrics, ENT, pathology) or four year (GP) can be started; without this training, working with patients is forbidden. There is no central placement test for said specialist training, only a board-registered spot as a resident/registrar is needed. As with all other studies in Austria, there is no tuition but compulsory students' union fee (approx €38 per year). A specific entrance exam (MedAT, Medizin-Aufnahmetest, medicine acceptance test) has to be taken but is open only once a year in summer; a fee of €110 has to be paid. In 2019, 16443 persons registered for the MedAT and 12960 took the test. 1.680 university places for both medicine and dentistry are offered each year with 95% of all places for EU citizens and 75% for applicants with an Austrian higher education entrance qualification/GCE A-levels. Many Germans who are denied studying in their home country try to study medicine in Austria; hence this quota was introduced and approved by the EU as most of them leave upon graduation.

The title of "Doktor" is granted to physicians (Dr. med. univ., Doctor medicinae universae, Dr. der gesamten Heilkunde = Dr. "of the entire art of healing") and dentists (Dr. med. dent., Doctor medicinae dentinae), who do not possess doctorates, but Master's level 6 year-training, similar to the American MD or DDS. although they have to write a diploma thesis of approx. 50–100 pages. In former days the same title was connected to an official doctoral degree in connection with an older study regulation. The law has been changed in 2002. Some of which are published in peer-reviewed journals while others are not. A post-graduate research doctorate (Dr. scient. med., Dr. scientiae medicinae, or PhD) can be obtained after a three years post-graduate study at a medical university.

All doctors may be addressed as "Doktor ______", and the title is usually contracted to "Dr. ______". In many everyday-day settings in Austria, also outside the clinic, it is common to address medical doctors solely as "Herr/Frau Doktor" (Mr./Ms./Mrs. doctor) without any specific family name (especially in rural areas and small villages, and by older people), and they are often viewed as the "real doctors". Among themselves, MDs do not use "doctor" as an appellation but just "Herr Kollege/Frau Kollegin" (Mr./Ms/Mrs. = "dear" colleague). Consistent use of "Doktor" when addressing another medical doctor is seen as confrontative and mockery.

==== Azerbaijan ====
In Azerbaijan, medical education is provided at the "baza ali" (basic higher) level in specialties such as Tibb (Medicine). Medical programs typically last six years, combining theoretical instruction and clinical training. After graduation, doctors may continue their training through rezidentura (residency), which lasts between 2–5 years depending on the specialty. Following residency, physicians receive the professional qualification of "həkim‑mütəxəssis". Some medical specialties also require certification ("sertifikasiya") in order to practice. Azerbaijani medical degrees are recognized internationally, depending on the country and licensing body.

==== Belgium ====
In Belgium, the medical degree awarded after six years of study is called "Docteur en Médecine" in the French-speaking part of the country and "Master in de geneeskunde" in Flanders. Physicians would then have to register with the Ordre des Médecins to practice medicine in the country. Physicians would then either have to do a three-year internship to become a general practitioner or up to 6 years to specialize.

==== Bosnia and Herzegovina ====
In Bosnia and Herzegovina, the title of "doktor medicine" (abbreviated "dr. med.") is awarded upon completion of six years of study at a Faculty of Medicine ("medicinski fakultet") immediately after high school.

==== Bulgaria ====
At the end of the six-year medical programs from Bulgarian medical schools, medical students are awarded the academic degree Master/Magister in Medicine and the professional title Physician – Doctor of Medicine (MD / MA ).

==== Cambodia ====
After six years of general medical education (a foundation year plus five years), all students will graduate with a Bachelor of Medical Sciences (BMedSc, Khmer: បរិញ្ញាប័ត្រ វិទ្យាសាស្រ្តវេជ្ជសាស្ត្រ), equivalent to Bachelor of Science, Bachelor of Surgery (MBBS). This degree does not allow graduates to work independently as a physician, but it is possible for those who wish to continue to master's degrees in other fields relating to medical sciences such as public health, epidemiology, biomedical science, and nutrition.

Medical graduates, who wish to be fully qualified as physicians or specialists must follow the process as below:

- General Practitioner's (GP) course of nine years (BMedSc plus a two-year internship). Clinical rotation during the internship is modulated within four main disciplines (general medicine, surgery, gynecology, and pediatrics). The medical certification awarded is Diploma of Doctor of Medicine (MD, Khmer: បណ្ឌិតវេជ្ជសាស្ត្រ ឬ វេជ្ជបណ្ឌិត) – equivalent to a master's degree [?].
- After graduating with BMedSc; any students who wish to enter a 'Residency Training Program', are required to sit for an Residency Entrance Exam. The duration of the programs takes four years after either BMedSc or MD (BMedSc or MD plus four years of specialization). Once the graduates have successfully defended their practical thesis, they are awarded the Diploma of Specialized Doctor (MD with specialization, Khmer: សញ្ញាប័ត្រ៖ វេជ្ជបណ្ឌិតឯកទេស, lit. 'Professional Doctorate').

All medical graduates must complete a 'Thesis Defense' and pass the National Exit Exam (Khmer: ប្រឡងចេញថ្នាក់ជាតិក្នុងវិស័យសុខាភិបាល) to become either GPs or medical or surgical specialists. Last but importantly, those GPs or MDs have to register their name in the Cambodian Medical Committee (CMC) to receive the license to see patients, and pay for the registration every year.

==== Canada ====
In Canada, the MD is the degree required to practise medicine. Similar to the United States, students in Canada from English-speaking provinces must complete four years of a bachelor's degree, then write the MCAT at which point they move into the typical four year medical school curriculum. As a practical matter, nearly all successful applicants have completed one or more degrees before admission to a Canadian medical school, although despite this the Canadian MD, along with other first professional degrees, is considered to be a bachelor's degree-level qualification.

The notable exception is the French-speaking province of Quebec, where their special CEGEP post-secondary institutions do not grant a bachelor's degree, but instead College Education Diplomas (DECs). Students typically enroll in a two-year Science Program such as Health Science, Pure & Applied, or Environmental (latter exclusive to CEGEP Dawson College) which lead into the Med-P qualifying year at Mcgill University or l'Université de Montréal, after which students complete the four-year curriculum similar to other provinces. Other Quebec universities such as the Université Laval and Université de Sherbrooke admit students possessing a DEC directly into the four-year program. This in total means the path to graduation from medical school is one to two years shorter for Quebec students (six or seven as opposed to eight).

Another exception is the availability of a 3-year medical school curriculum, offered at two medical schools in Canada, the McMaster University Medical School and the University of Calgary.

McGill University Faculty of Medicine is the only medical school in Canada that continues to award the MD, CM degrees (abbreviated MDCM). MDCM is from the Latin Medicinae Doctorem et Chirurgiae Magistrum meaning "Doctor of Medicine and Master of Surgery".

Upon graduation, students enter into a residency phase of training. Prior to obtaining an independent practicing license from a provincial regulatory body, students must complete the Medical Council of Canada Qualifying Examination to obtain the Licentiate of the Medical Council of Canada (LMCC) qualification. and complete the specialty certifying exam from their respective college, the Royal College of Physicians and Surgeons of Canada for specialists and the College of Family Physicians of Canada for family physicians.

==== Chile ====
In Chile, medical education begins after graduating high-school, in public or private universities, which select candidates based on a national entrance exams (former University Selection Test, now in transition to a new selection test). Public universities and private universities cost around US$8,000–12,000 a year. In almost every university the career lasts for 7 years, the first two being basic sciences, then three years of preclinical studies, and ending with two years of supervised clinical practice (internship, or "internado") both at hospitals and ambulatory centers. Upon graduation, students obtain the professional title "Médico Cirujano", equivalent to Doctor of Medicine (MD). After graduation, in order to practice medicine in public establishments of primary or hospital care, every new physician must take the EUNACOM (Single National Exam for Medical Knowledge). The title enables the graduate to practice as a General Practitioner, and many of them may follow specialization studies in clinical or non-clinical fields. There is a national accreditation program, mandatory for every school of medicine in the country. In Chile, physicians receive the courtesy denomination of "Doctor" followed by their family name, even though in an academic environment the medical title is not accepted as an equivalent to PhDs; regardless, at community and family level, and in day-to-day activities, they are often viewed as "real doctors".

==== China ====
In China, research universities offer the eight-year Doctor of Medicine program. In the meantime, the majority of primary medical training comes in the form of a 5-year Bachelor of Medicine degree, which includes 4 years of basic science, biomedical science and clinical science training (with short-term clerkship) and 1 years of full-time clerkship training. Graduates from such programs are eligible to sit for Medical Doctor License Examination in China providing they are working as resident physicians or surgeons in a hospital. Many of the young doctors do seek further training by entering a three-year Master of Medicine (clinical track) program or five-year Doctor of Medicine (clinical track). Some take a job/promotion after the three-year program and work for a number of years and then take on another three years of training to get the ultimate Doctor of Medicine degree.

==== Croatia ====
In Croatia, the title of "doktor medicine" (abbreviated "dr. med.") is awarded to candidates who successfully completed six years of study in medicine and defended their graduate thesis (student's original research in clinical / preclinical medicine or life sciences). The title is legally awarded only upon the successful thesis exam (thesis defence) in the presence of a board of senior researchers and candidate's research mentor. It is not equivalent to "doktor znanosti" degree ("doctor scientiae", abbreviated "dr.sc."), which is equivalent to PhD.

==== Cuba ====
In Cuba, the title of "Doctor en Medicina" (Doctor of Medicine) is awarded upon completion of six years of study at a University of Medical Sciences after high school. Medicine was one of the four foundational careers of the first Cuban university named Real y Pontificia Universidad de San Jeronimo de La Habana (current University of Havana) founded in 1728.

==== Czech Republic ====
In the Czech Republic, students are awarded the title MUDr. (medicinae universae doctor in Latin) upon successfully passing set of State Examinations after six years of medical school composed of theoretical and clinical training.

==== Dominican Republic ====
In the Dominican Republic, it is known as "Doctor en Medicina" (Doctor in Medicine). In 1511 the Spanish Catholic church founded the first university of the Americas in Santo Domingo present capital of modern-day Dominican Republic and name it Universidad Santo Tomas de Aquino (today Universidad Autonoma de Santo Domingo). In 1630 this university graduated the first medical doctors of the Americas and amongst the graduates some Native Americans included.

==== Ecuador ====
In Ecuador, medical school begins after graduating high school. There are two options: applying to public or private universities. Both private and public university select their candidates based on entrance exams. Public universities are free, while private universities cost around US$6,000–12,000 a year. In most universities, the course of study lasts for six years. After graduating, students obtain a degree of "médico" or "médico cirujano", depending on which is offered by each university. Both degrees are equivalent to the doctor of medicine (MD).

==== Egypt ====
In Egypt, the primary medical degree is Bachelor of Medicine and Surgery (MBBCh.), which is obtained after completion of five years of medical education and two years National Compulsory Internship Program. The Degree Doctor of Medicine (MD) is the highest academic medical degree in Egypt. It is a research degree obtained after the primary medical qualification (MBBCh.) and a master's degree in a certain specialty in medicine. It usually requires coursework, clinical training and a thesis. The degree Doctor of Medicine allows for promotion to the level of "Consultant Physician" in a specific medical specialty.

==== Estonia ====
In Estonia, there is only one university, The University of Tartu, with programs in medicine and dentistry. The program in medicine lasts for six years, including a one-year clinical internship, and students are awarded Doctor of Medicine (MD) upon graduation. The degree is academically equivalent to a master's degree. After that, one can work either as a general practitioner or enter a residency program to become a specialized doctor. Residency usually lasts, depending on the field, three to five years, with surgical residencies usually being the longest (5 years).

==== France ====
After graduating from high school with a Baccalaureat, any student can register at a university of medicine (there are about 30 of them throughout the country). Until 2018, at the end of the first year, an internal ranking examination took place at each of these universities in order to implement the numerus clausus. This ranking examination and the numerus clausus has since been abolished. First year consists primarily of theoretical classes such as biophysics and biochemistry, anatomy, ethics or histology. Passing first year is generally considered very challenging, requiring hard and continuous work. Each student can only try twice. For example, prior to its 2019 merger with Paris Diderot University, the Université René Descartes welcomed about 2,000 students in the first year and only 300 after numerus clausus.

The second and third year are usually quite theoretical although the teachings are often accompanied by placements in the field (e.g., internships as nurses or in the emergency room, depending on the university).

During their fourth, fifth and sixth years, medical students get a special status called "externe" (In some universities, such as Pierre et Marie Curie, the externe status is given beginning in the third year). They work as interns every morning at the hospital plus a few night shifts a month and study in the afternoon. Each internship lasts between three and four months and takes place in a different department. Med students get five weeks off a year.

At the end of the sixth year, they need to pass a national ranking exam, which will determine their specialty. The first student gets to choose first, then the second, etcetera. Usually, students work hard during the fifth and sixth years in order to train properly for the national ranking exam. During these years, actual practice at the hospital and in conjunction with some theoretical courses are meant to balance the training. Such externs' average wage stands between 100 and 300 euros a month.

After taking those ranking exams, students can start as residents in the specialty they have been able to pick. That is the point from which they also start getting paid.

Towards the end of the medical program, French medical students are provided with more responsibilities and are required to defend a thesis; however, unlike a PhD thesis, no original research is actually necessary to write an MD thesis. At the conclusion of the thesis defense, French medical students receive a State Diploma of Doctor of Medicine (MD, French: diplôme d'Etat de docteur en médecine). Every new doctor must then proceed to a Diploma of Specialised Studies (DES, French: diplôme d'Etudes spécialisées) to mark their specialty. Some students may also receive a Diploma of Complementary Specialized Studies (DESC, French: diplôme d'Etudes spécialisées complémentaires).

==== Georgia ====
In Georgia, medical universities in Georgia offer a six-year curriculum leading to the award of Doctor of Medicine (MD) "Physician" "Medical Doctor (MD), a European medical degree which is valid throughout the world. Some of the reputed medical universities include Batumi State University, Tbilisi State Medical University, Akaki Tsereteli State University, Ilia State University and University of Georgia

==== Germany ====
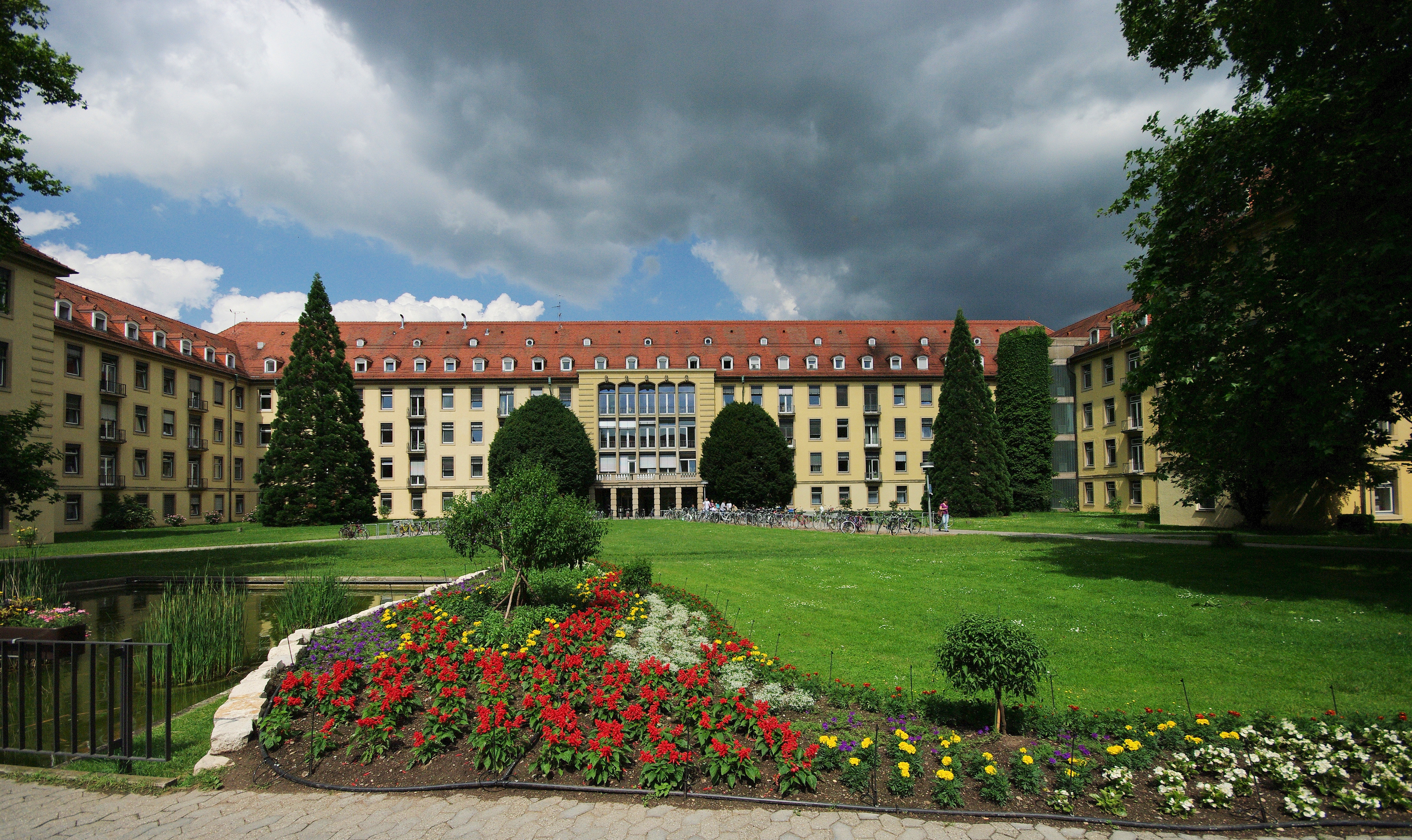
The University Medical Center Freiburg

After at least six years of medical school, the students graduate with a final federal medical exam (Dritter Abschnitt der ärztlichen Prüfung). Graduates receive their license to practice medicine and the professional title of physician (Arzt). About 60% of them additionally obtain the academic degree Doctor of Medicine (Dr. med.). The European Research Council ruled in 2010 that a medical doctorate alone is not considered equivalent to a PhD research degree for the purpose of selection for ERC Starting Grants, requiring additional evidence (e.g., proof of an appointment that requires doctoral equivalency, such as a post-doctoral fellowship) for the overall training to be considered equivalent to a PhD.

==== Guyana ====
In Guyana, Doctor of Medicine (MD) degree is awarded after the completion of four years or five years of study. Texila American University, Green Heart University, American International School of Medicine, Alexander American University, Lincoln American University provides medicine programs.These institutions are recognized by the National Accreditation Council (NAC) of Guyana and are listed in international directories like WDOMS. Some schools, such as Texila, have additional accreditations like CAAM-HP and ACCM, and their graduates are eligible to sit for international licensing exams including USMLE andFMGE.

==== Hungary ====
In Hungary, after six years of medical school, which includes a sixth-year internship, students are awarded the 'okleveles orvosdoktor' (Doctor of Medicine) degree.

==== Indonesia ====
In Indonesia, the title of "dokter" (dr.) is awarded after 3.5–4 years of pre-clinical study (bachelor's of medicine) and 1.5–2 years of clinical study in a university hospital (medical doctor profession program). After a medical student finishes at least five years of the programs, they need to take the "Students' Proficiency Test in the Professional Medical Program" (Uji Kompetensi Mahasiswa Program Profesi Dokter or UKMPPD). If they pass the test, they can take the Hippocratic Oath and at then entitled to use Dokter (dr.) before their name. Note that "dr." is used for medical graduates, while Dr. (or incorrectly DR. i.e. Doktor) is used for PhD holders. Then they need to take a year-long internship course in primary health care clinics (also known as Puskesmas) or primary hospitals to practice as a general practitioner under supervision of senior doctors.

Those who wished to further their study in a specialization can take a graduate course and will be entitled to use "Specialist of ..." after their name (e.g.: Sp.A for Spesialis Anak = Pediatrician). A graduate course of medicine is equal to a residency program. It requires candidates to study for four years followed by an internship in a hospital.

==== Iran ====
In Iran, Medical education begins after high school. No pre-med course or BSc degree is required. The eligibility is determined through the rank applicants obtain in the public university entrance exam being held every year throughout the country. The entry to medical school is competitive and only students with the highest rank are accepted into medical program. The primary medical degree is completed in 7–7.5 years. On the final years (last 1–2 years) medical students need to do a research on a medical topic and provide thesis as part of their trainings. Medical graduates are awarded a certificate in general medicine, called "Professional Doctorate in Medicine" validated by the "Ministry of Health and Medical Education" of Iran. All physicians will obtain license and medical council registration number from the "Medical Council of Iran" before they officially begin to practice. They may subsequently specialize in a specific medical field at medical schools offering the necessary qualifications.

==== Israel ====
There are seven university medical schools in Israel, located at the Technion in Haifa, Ben-Gurion University of the Negev in Beersheba, Tel Aviv University, the Hebrew University of Jerusalem, the medical school of Bar-Ilan University in Safed, Reichman University in Herzliya, and Ariel University. Most follow the European 6-year model although some have 4-year programs for students with degrees in certain biological sciences similar to the US system. The entrance requirements of the various schools of medicine are very strict. Israeli students require a high school Baccalaureate average above 100 and psychometric examination grade over 740, which corresponds to the 99th percentile. Candidates achieving these demanding cognitive requirements are then selected according to their ranking in the Mor and Mirkam MMI personality tests. Approximately 30% of applicants pass the Mor and Mirkam tests and are accepted into medical school.

There is a shortage of medical school spots in Israel. In the past, the Technion Medical School, Ben Gurion University, and Tel Aviv University Sackler Faculty of Medicine offered 4-year MD programs for North American students who with college degrees who took the MCAT and were interested in completing rigorous medical education in Israel before returning to the US or Canada, but discontinued those programs to free up resources to train more Israeli doctors. Two additional medical schools are planned to open at the Weizmann Institute of Science in Rehovot and the University of Haifa.

Following graduation from the 6-year or 4-year program, all graduates are required to do a 1-year internship to be licensed by the Ministry of Health and practice medicine professionally. Residency takes 4 (Internal Medicine, Family Medicine) to 7 (Neurosurgery) years.

==== Italy ====
In Italy, before the Bologna process, the degree of "Dottore in Medicina e Chirurgia" (literally Doctor in Medicine and Surgery, from the Latin Medicinae Doctor et Chirurgiae) is awarded after completion of at least six years of study and clinical training in a university and after the submission of a thesis, that consists of original research.

However, spurred by the Bologna process, a major reform instituted in 1999 to align University programmes with the more universal system of undergraduate (bachelor's degree) and postgraduate studies (master's and doctoral degrees) and as such the degree of 'Dottore in Medicina e Chirurgia' is no longer offered and was replaced with the 'Laurea Magistrale in Medicina e Chirurgia' (Master of Medicine and Surgery). In this context, the new Laurea Magistrale a ciclo unico in Medicina e Chirurgia is a six-year second cycle degree, equivalent to a master's degree (360 ECTS credits) which can be earned in a six-year programme and requires a scientific research thesis. Consequently, the new medical degrees in Italy is considered to be equivalent to a Medical Doctor or Doctor of Medicine (MD) Master's degree academically and legally.

==== Kazakhstan ====
In Kazakhstan, professional medical education leads to a first professional degree commonly referred to as a Doctor of Medicine (MD), though the exact title may vary by institution. Medical programs typically last five to six years and combine foundational science courses with clinical training in hospitals and outpatient settings. Some universities, such as Nazarbayev University, offer graduate-entry MD programs for students who have already completed a relevant bachelor's degree, while most other programs admit students directly from secondary school, often with a preparatory year to strengthen foundational knowledge. Admission for school-leavers is generally based on performance in the Unified National Test (UNT; Ұлттық бірыңғай тестілеу, ҰБТ) and may include university-specific entrance exams or interviews.

Graduates may pursue postgraduate medical training, including residency programs, and must obtain a medical activity license from the Ministry of Healthcare to legally perform medical services in Kazakhstan.

==== Latvia ====
In Latvia, the duration of basic medical education is six years and leads to the Doctor of Medicine degree (ārsta grāds or MD). This degree is done full time and earns you 240 credits or 360 ECTS. The level acquired by this degree at the Latvian Qualifications Framework is similar to (EQF) level which is at is Level 7 and at the International Standard Classification of Education (ISCED) level is also Level 7. These levels indicate this qualification to be Masters level which is contrary to what North American MD is since it is considered a higher standing Bachelor or 1st Professional degree.

==== Lithuania ====
In Lithuania, the duration of basic medical education is six years and leads to the Doctor of Medicine degree (Aukštojo mokslo diplomas, nurodantis suteiktą gydytojo kvalifikaciją or MD). This degree is considered a Masters of Health Science degree.

==== Malaysia ====
In Malaysia, there are two types of MDs, one being for a basic medical degree while the other being a doctoral degree, depending on the awarding universities. The basic medical degree MDs (Similar to the MBBS awarded by other local universities) are awarded by both private and public universities, mostly are trained as an undergraduate 5-year course, however, with the establishment of Perdana University, it became the first university in Malaysia to provide a 4-year graduate entry course.

Examples of universities in Malaysia offering the M.D degree are:

- University Sains Malaysia
- National University of Malaysia
- University Putra Malaysia
- Universiti Tunku Abdul Rahman
- UCSI University

MDs are being awarded as a doctoral degree in public universities such as University of Malaya.

==== Philippines ====
In the Philippines, the MD is a first professional degree in medicine. To be accepted in Philippine medical schools, one must have finished a college degree before one can proceed to have a medical education. It is attained by either completing a 4-year degree or a 5-year degree (with internship included) from an accredited institution private and public Medical School by the Association of Philippine Medical Colleges and the Commission on Higher Education. The MD degree does not permit the practice of medicine but qualifies the degree-holder to apply for registration to the Professional Regulatory Commission. Registration to the commission through completion of internship and examinations will grant the privilege of practicing medicine in the Philippines. Moreover, the licensed Physician has the option to proceed for medical specialization and the taking of diplomate board examinations conducted by the respective board of medical specialists in a particular field.

==== Poland ====
In Poland the title/professional degree of lekarz (abbreviated lek.), also the name of the profession (physician), is granted after completing a six-year medical program, study (students apply to it directly after graduating high school with matura) and is equivalent to magister, magister inżynier or magister sztuki (master). Many medical higher schools in Poland also offer medicine programs in English, which award the Doctor of Medicine (MD) degree. In contrast, a higher, doctoral academic research degree in medicine resembling a PhD is named doktor nauk medycznych (abbreviated dr n. med.) (Doctor of Medical Sciences), or even higher scientific degree after habilitation, doktor habilitowany nauk medycznych (dr hab. n. med.) (can be treated as doctor of science). Specialization is valued similarly to a specialization in the English system. It is not a pre-requisite for a dr n. med. or dr hab. n. med. which are an academic/scientific, not a professional titles in Poland.

==== Romania ====
Romanian medical programs last for six years (including clinical practice), which is the long-cycle first professional degree and concludes with a final licensing examination (licența), based on the dissertation of the student's original research. The degree awarded is 'Doctor-Medic' and graduates are entitled to use the title "Dr."

==== Russia ====
Medical universities in Russia offer a six-year curriculum leading to award a professional graduate degree, called qualification (degree) of "specialist" (Diploma of Specialist; in medicine, Diploma of Physician).

The title of Doctor of Medical Sciences (Russian: доктор медицинских наук, "doktor medicinskikh nauk" abbreviated д. м. н.) is a higher research doctoral degree, which may be earned after the Candidate of Medical Sciences (the latter is informally regarded in Russia as equivalent to the PhD).

==== Serbia ====
In Serbia, the MD degree is awarded upon completion of six years of study at a School of Medicine immediately after high school, after which a six-month residency following a national exam has to be completed in order to complete the degree.

==== Singapore ====
The American Duke University has a medical school based in Singapore (Duke-NUS Medical School), and follows the North-American model of styling its first professional degree "Doctor of Medicine" ("MD"), consid. By contrast, the Yong Loo Lin School of Medicine at the National University of Singapore confers MB BS as the first professional degree.

==== Slovakia ====
Slovakia's medical education is offered at four medical schools in the country. Two of them are faculties of the Comenius UniversityJessenius School of Medicine in Martin, and there is a second medical school in Bratislava Slovak Medical University in Bratislava (SZU) while the fourth one is the Pavol Josef Šafarik University in Košice. Both the Jessenius School of Medicine and the Faculty of Medicine in Košice have several international students. The Jessenius School of Medicine has almost a thousand international students, most from Norway.

Admission to the medical schools is based on entrance examination that can be undergone once a year. The program is a six-year program in general medicine with a strictly preclinical and clinical division. The preclinical years are the two first, and are purely theoretical. They consist of subjects such as cell biology, genetics, biophysics, medical chemistry, anatomy, biochemistry, histology, embryology and so on. From the third year onwards, the study is integrated with practical learning at the faculty's associated teaching hospital, including major multi-year subjects such internal medicine, surgery, pediatrics, etc. In the sixth and final year, the student must pass four final state examinations and defend a self-composed thesis in order to graduate with a professional doctorate granting them the title of MUDr. for practicing in Slovakia or the Czech Republic or MD when practicing outside of Slovakia.

==== Slovenia ====
In Slovenia, the title of "doktor medicine" (abbreviated "dr. med.") is awarded upon completion of six years of study at one of Slovenia's two Faculties of Medicine, in Ljubljana or Maribor. Studying at these faculties is only possible if the student has completed a general upper secondary school (gimnazija) programme and passed the general matura examination (splošna matura).

==== South Korea ====
In South Korea, there is a Medical Doctor (MD) license.

The medical educations in South Korea (Republic of Korea) are six or four years in duration, six-year courses starting right after high schools, and four-year course starting after four-year's university education (to start the four-year course, the student needs a bachelor's degree). The first two years in the six-year system is composed of basic sciences and liberal art courses.

==== Taiwan ====
In Taiwan, the MD is a first awarded professional degree that goes up and beyond the limits of upper education.

==== Tanzania ====
In Tanzania, MD is the first awarded degree and takes five years of medical school, plus a sixth-year internship, Students are awarded the degree of Doctor of Medicine (MD). The famous medical school in the country includes the Muhimbili University of Health and Allied Sciences (MUHAS), KCMC University formerly known as Kilimanjaro Christian Medical University College under Tumaini Makumira University, the University of Dar es Salaam, Mbeya College of Health and Allied Sciences (UDSM - MCHAS), The University of Dodoma- School of Medicine and Dentistry (UDOM), Catholic University of health and allied sciences (CUHAS) and Kampala International University in Tanzania.

After undergraduate studies, the students pursue residency termed Master of Medicine for 3, 4, or 5 years, depending on the specialty they are interested in. After that, the students are awarded a Master of Medicine degree, after which they can further go on to do superspecialities for two more years and after that do a fellowship.

==== Thailand ====
The Thai medical education follows the six-year European system, consisting of one year in basic-science, two years in pre-clinical training, and three years for clinical training. Upon graduation, all medical students must pass national medical licensing examinations and a university-based comprehensive test. After medical school, newly graduated doctors are under contract to spend a year of internship and two years of tenure in rural areas before they are eligible for any other residency positions or specialized training. The students will receive Doctor of Medicine (MD) degree. However, the degree is equivalent to master's degree in Thailand. Specialty training after the MD degree requires at least four–six years residency program in the training university hospitals and must pass the board examination. Board-certified specialized degree is equivalent to doctoral degree.

==== Tunisia ====
In Tunisia, education is free for all Tunisian citizens and for foreigners who have scholarships. The oldest Medical school is a faculty of the University of Tunis. There are four medicine faculties situated in the major cities of Tunis, Sfax, Sousse and Monastir. Admission is bound to the success and score in the baccalaureate examination. Admission score threshold is very high, based on competition among all applicants throughout the nation. Medical school curriculum consists of six years. The first two years are medical theory (PCEM), containing all basic sciences related to medicine, and the last four years (DCEM) consists of clinical issues related to all medical specialties. During these last four years, the student gets the status of "Externe". The student has to attend at the university hospital every day, rotating around all wards. Every period is followed by a clinical exam regarding the student's knowledge in that particular specialty. After those five years, there are two years on internship, in which the student is a physician but under the supervision of the chief doctor; the student rotates over the major and most essential specialties during period of four months each. After that, student has the choice of either passing the residency national exam or extending his internship for another year, after which he gains the status of family physician. The residency program consists of four to five years in the specialty he qualifies, depending on his score in the national residency examination under the rule of highest score chooses first. Whether the student chooses to be a family doctor or a specialist, he has to write a doctoral thesis, which he will be defending in front of a jury, after which he gains his degree of Docteur d'état en Medecine (MD).

==== Turkey ====
In Turkey, the title of "Tıp Doktoru" ("Doctor of Medicine") is awarded upon completion of six years continuous study started with five years university education including three years basic sciences, two years clinical courses followed by one year of internship in university hospitals. The internal structure and methodology of training vary among universities; however most schools have an integrated medical curriculum. The vertical integration between basic and clinical sciences and horizontal integration between disciplines have become more prevalent approaches as well as student-oriented practices such as problem-based learning. Regardless of the university, the whole program is equivalent to a combined degree of bachelors and masters; thus while the program itself is counted as a bachelor's until graduation, every student graduates with the equivalent of a master's degree, without a thesis. As a result of the adoption of the European Qualifications Framework, graduated students are awarded with the Medical License Diploma (Tıp Lisans Diploması). The graduates, becoming Doctors of Medicine upon the confirmation of diploma by the Ministry of Health; are obliged to work as general practitioners through State Service Obligation (Devlet Hizmeti Yükümlülüğü) under the Ministry of Health (only for Turkish citizens), eligible to start residency training through a state exam called "TUS" (short for "Tıpta Uzmanlık Sınavı"), or apply for a PhD program in a relevant field.

Eligible MD students, subject to certain requirements, may apply for a MD-PhD programme at the end of second year in some universities.

==== Ukraine ====
In Ukraine, by 2018, graduates of the school with completed secondary education that have coped with the relevant exams (in the disciplines designated by these universities) in the nationwide system for assessing graduates' knowledge – EIT (Ukrainian: ЗНО, External independent testing) based on the rating – may be admitted to the Medical Universities.

Ukrainian medical universities offer a six-year curriculum, which should end with the passing of the State Complex Examination. The graduate receives the Diploma of the State Standard with the title "Specialist Diploma", which specifies a specialty and qualification (for example, "Physician"), or "Magister's Diploma" also of a state standard. After that, the graduate according to the rating division (at the university) is required to undergo a practical internship course (working as a doctor under the supervision of an experienced doctor) with a duration of two to three years, in the corresponding specialty. Successful completion of internship implies that an intern passes an examination on a specialty, including testing and receives a certificate of a specialist physician of the Ministry of Health, which is a formal permission for practical activity.

Thus, the American MD and the Ukrainian Physician have identical titles. On the other hand, the colloquial (not official terminology) Doctor of Medicine means that a Physician with a higher education successfully defended his thesis, after a two-year postgraduate course and corresponding term of research (Candidate of Medical Sciences before 2015, or PhD after 2015 – until 2020), which is closer to the English system of degrees.

==== United States ====
In the United States, the MD awarded by medical schools is a professional doctorate and is accredited by the Liaison Committee on Medical Education (LCME), an independent body sponsored by the Association of American Medical Colleges, and the American Medical Association (AMA) (as opposed to the Doctor of Philosophy degree which requires completion of novel research, a written dissertation of that research which is in principle worthy of publication in a peer reviewed journal, and an examination or defense of that dissertation). Although MDs are eligible to compete for and attain federal research grants in the United States and perform research it is contested that MD's are qualified to do research due to their lack of training and experience in that field.

In addition to the MD, the Doctor of Osteopathic Medicine (DO) is an equivalent professional doctoral degree for physicians and surgeons offered by medical schools in the United States. According to Harrison's Principles of Internal Medicine, "the training, practice, credentialing, licensure, and reimbursement of osteopathic physicians is virtually indistinguishable from those of MD physicians, with 4 years of osteopathic medical school followed by specialty and subspecialty training and certification."

Admission to medical school in the United States is highly competitive, and in the United States there were 21,869 matriculants to medical school out of 53,371 applicants (≈41%) in 2019. While some medical school admission policies do not require students to complete a four-year undergraduate degree (see admission criteria at Yale University, Emory University, Cornell University, University of Chicago, and others), the overwhelming majority of incoming medical students in the United States have completed a four-year undergraduate degree. They must also take the Medical College Admission Test (MCAT). Before graduating from a medical school and being awarded the Doctor of Medicine degree, students are required to take the United States Medical Licensing Examination (USMLE) Step 1 and the clinical knowledge Step 2 exam. As of 2020, the requirement of the Clinical Skills portion of the Step 2 exam was removed. The MD degree is typically earned in four years and is a professional doctoral degree. Following the awarding of the MD, physicians who wish to practice in the United States are required to complete at least one internship year (PGY-1) and pass the USMLE Step 3.

In order to receive board eligible or board accredited status in a specialty of medicine such as general surgery or internal medicine, physicians undergo additional specialized training in the form of a residency. Those who wish to further specialize in areas such as cardiology or infectious diseases then complete a fellowship. Depending upon the physician's chosen field, residencies and fellowships involve an additional three to eight years of training after obtaining the MD. This can be lengthened with additional research years, which can last one, two, or more years.

Even though the MD is a professional degree and not a research doctorate (i.e., a PhD), many holders of the MD degree conduct research and publish in journals during training and after graduation. Combined medical and research training is offered through programs granting an MD-PhD. The grade Doctor of Medical Research for physicians specialized in "research" work has become quite rare since the 1980s with the highly respected PhD being more attractive nationally and globally. The National Institutes of Health (NIH), through its Medical Scientist Training Program, funds MD-PhD training programs at many universities. Some MDs choose a quasi-research career and receive funding from the NIH as well as other sources such as the Howard Hughes Medical Institute. The United States Department of Education and the National Science Foundation do not include the MD or other professional doctorates among the degrees that are equivalent to research doctorates.

==== Uzbekistan ====
In Uzbekistan, medical education leading to the first professional Doctor of Medicine equivalent degree typically takes six years, combining theoretical instruction, clinical training, and practical internships. After graduation, physicians can enter rezidentura (residency) programs lasting between 2 and 5 years, depending on specialization. Certain medical specialties require additional certification ("sertifikasiya") for clinical practice.

Medical institutions must obtain a medical activity license from the Ministry of Health, a process regulated by government resolution, and as of 2025, new, tighter licensing and accreditation norms are enforced by a dedicated Ministry department.

==== Venezuela ====
After graduating from high school in Venezuela students can apply for federal appointment to a six-year medical program within a university. Only Public Universities offer this degree in Venezuela. Any student can apply for federal appointment by Ministry of Higher Education. So that, the student is allowed to register at university and follow a medical program. This a six-year program divided within three cycles. First cycle: Theory and lectures (1–2), second cycle: pre-clinical training (3–4) and third cycle: clinical training (5–6).

First year consists mainly of theoretical classes. however there are practical experiences since first day in laboratories and institutes, such as biochemistry, anatomy which includes lectures and teaching sessions with cadavers in dissection tables, molecular biology, histology, embryology and many others general subjects.

The second year is mainly theoretical, although most teaching sessions take place in laboratories. After completing these years the student knows how the human body is and how it works. There is also a Medical Exercise demonstration which includes a guided visit to primary care centers during a complete semester or year-round depending on the university.

During the third year medical students start studying pharmacology, pathology, and physical examination. Passing successfully first, second, and the third year is commonly considered a filter, almost half of previously admitted students leave voluntarily.

The fourth-year medical students enter the field starting to visit hospitals and healthcare services. This is called Pre-Clinical Cycle were they acquire deep knowledge about clinical examination visiting specialized units such as Internal Medicine, Trauma and orthopedics, surgery, and gynecology and obstetrics. They start to be members of a medical team. Every morning at the hospital, plus one night shift per week, and lectures in the afternoon. Each internship lasts between four and six months and takes place in a different department.

The fifth and sixth years are very similar but this time they applied their previously earned clinical knowledge and skills starting to follow patients independently. At the end of the sixth year, they need to pass a highly supervised medical practice examination in an unserved outpatient center or specialized hospital in order to earn the degree. During these years, there is training at the hospital almost exclusively. Very few theoretical courses are meant to balance the training. Once completed they earn a university degree and a title granted by the Bolivarian Republic of Venezuela as "Medical Surgeon" this is considered equivalent to a M.D degree.

There is also a five years program the "Médico Integral Comunitario" title and degree granted by newly created universities and headed by Cuban nationals from the Cuba – Venezuela cooperation agreements. This program has been subject of controversy in the country over the legitimacy of the Cuban doctors' licensure for teaching and practice medicine.

After graduation, recently graduated doctors acquire the right to use Dr. before their names but still must follow a one-year exercise in the countryside or a two years training in a specialized hospital. So that, They can be enabled to practice medicine with a full license in Venezuela and the right to work as a medical doctor, generally as a general practitioner (Artículo 8). That is the point from which they also start getting paid.

They can follow specialized studies which usually last between three or five years depending on specialization and a doctorate for relevant research and a thesis, which usually take three or more years.

=== Postgraduate clinical degrees ===
==== Bhutan ====
In Bhutan, a medical doctor who completes four to five years of medical school is awarded with MBBS or Dr.title by their respective universities ( usually from universities in Sri Lanka, India, Thailand and Bangladesh). Upon recognition by Bhutan Health and Medical council, they work as medical doctor in country. M.D title is usually given to those who completes three to four years of residency for specialised course like surgery, medicine pediatrics, etc.

==== India ====
The MBBS (Bachelor of Medicine/Bachelor of Surgery) degree represents the first (undergraduate) level of training required to be licensed as a physician (other degrees in alternative medicine are present like BAMS, BHMS, BSMS etc.) The MS or MD degree is a postgraduate degree, representative of speciality training. The equivalent training in the US or Canada would be the completion of a medical (post-graduate) degree. Eligibility for the MS or MD course is restricted to medical graduates holding the MBBS degree.

The MBBS course is for 5 1/2 years, and training imparted is as follows:

1. Pre-clinical (Anatomy, Physiology, and Biochemistry)
2. Para-clinical (Pathology, Microbiology, Pharmacology, Forensic Medicine and Community Medicine)
3. Clinical (Ophthalmology, Otorhinolaryngology, General Medicine, General Surgery, Pediatrics and Obstetrics/Gynecology; with speciality rotations such as Orthopaedics, Radiology, Pulmonary Medicine, Psychiatry, Dermatology, Anesthesiology and Dentistry)

After 5 1/2 years of study and the successful completion of an examination, the candidate receives a Bachelor of Medicine & Bachelor of Surgery (MBBS) degree. A further 3-year course which includes both theoretical and practical elements, in a pre-clinical or clinical subject of a non-surgical nature such as Physiology, Pharmacology, Internal Medicine, Pediatrics, Pathology, Psychiatry, Microbiology, results in the award of the MD (Doctor of Medicine) degree. Whereas in a pre-clinical or clinical subject of a surgical nature (e.g. Anatomy, General Surgery, Orthopaedics, Obstetrics/Gynaecology, Ophthalmology), the candidate gets a MS (Master of Surgery) degree, these are specialist or Post Graduate doctors.

The Doctor of Medicine awarded by Medical Universities in India and regulated by Medical Council of India are doctorate level qualification incorporating high level specialist clinical training, research and teaching. Doctor of Philosophy (PhD) in medical subjects is a research doctorate level qualification and could be done under supervision of a guide who is DM qualified from India (rather than PhD) and usually does not involve direct clinical work or teaching of scholars of that specialty. Scope for PhD in medical subjects is very limited in India as all faculty appointments mostly (except for some pre-clinical subjects) require a person to hold MD/MS in their respective specialties rather than a PhD.

A second alternate qualification termed DNB (Diplomate of National Board), is considered equivalent to the MD and MS degrees. However, the DNB is not awarded by Medical Universities and thus is not a doctorate level qualification. It can be obtained by passing the exam conducted by the National Board of Examinations after completing three years of post-MBBS residency training in teaching hospitals recognised by the board but not necessarily by the Medical Council. The College of Physicians & Surgeons of Mumbai (established in 1912) also awards higher postgraduate qualifications in clinical and pre-clinical specialities, called FCPS (Fellowship of CPS); it involves three years of study and the successful completion of an examination, which includes both theoretical and practical elements, and a research thesis and a viva. The FCPS is representative of speciality clinical training, and equivalent to MD/MS/DNB/PhD Medical in Medical Doctorate in other parts of the world. Until 2007, the Government of India and the Medical Council of India recognised the FCPS qualification – since then, this is being done by State Medical Councils.

After obtaining the first postgraduate degree, that is MD/MS/FCPS/DNB/PhD Medical, one can go for further specialisation in medical or surgical fields. This involves a highly competitive entrance examination. This course has three years of additional training and requires the submission of a dissertation (thesis). This is also considered a clinical doctorate as the focus is on preparing a super-specialist with adequate clinical as well as research training. After the dissertation is approved and the exit examination (theory and practical) is cleared, the degree awarded is DM (Doctor of Medicine), (PhD Medical). Based on the specific field of training, the degree awarded is DM in Cardiac Anaesthesia, Cardiology, Neurology, Nephrology, Gastroenterology, Neuroradiology, Critical Care, Pulmonology, Hematology, Medical Oncology, Clinical Pharmacology, Pediatric Critical Care, Pediatric Neurology, Neonatology, Pediatric Gastroenterology, Neuroanaesthesia, etc. For surgical superspecialities the degree awarded is MCh (Magister Chirurgiae), like MCh in Cardio-thoracic and Vascular Surgery, Endocrine Surgery, Neurosurgery, Surgical Gastroenterology, Urology, Plastic Surgery, Pediatric Surgery etc. DM and MCh are the clinical equivalent of a doctoral degree.

A third alternate qualification is DNB (superspecialties), offered by National Board of Examinations, like DNB in Cardiology, Neurology, Cardiac Surgery, Neurosurgery.

Following DM or MCh, one can also go for postdoctoral fellowship programs of one-year duration in specific subspecialties like Cardiac Electrophysiology, Invasive cardiology, Pediatric cardiology, Epilepsy, stroke, electroencephalography, movement disorders, neuromuscular disorders, cerebrovascular surgery, skull base surgery, neurocritical care, pediatric cardiac surgery etc. offered by prestigious government institutes and abroad.

The National Board of Examinations also awards the DNB degree for six year integrated surgical courses in specialties of Neurosurgery, Cardio-thoracic and Vascular Surgery, Pediatric Surgery and Plastic surgery. The residency period lasts six years post MBBS and thus alleviates the need to undergo a three-year residency in General Surgery.

==== Pakistan ====
In Pakistan MBBS is the undergraduate degree. The MD is a higher doctorate, awarded by medical universities based on successful completion of a residency program of four to six years' duration in a university hospital. Many universities are offering MD. Parallel to MD, MS is a higher doctorate awarded on successful completion of four to six years' duration of a residency program in surgical field.

==== Sri Lanka ====
In Sri Lanka, the MD degree is a higher postgraduate degree that is awarded by the Postgraduate Institute of Medicine after completion of a postgraduate course, examinations and speciality training. The MD degree in Sri Lanka is representative of specialty training in clinical, para clinical, and preventive medicine (e.g., general medicine, cardiology, nephrology, oncology, para clinical such as microbiology, haematology and preventive such as community medicine). Entry for the MD course is open only for medical graduates holding the MBBS degree (with a duration of 5 1/2 years), and training is obtained in medical disciplines that are non-surgical in nature (e.g., internal medicine, radiology, pathology, etc.) After three or four years of study and the successful completion of an examination with written as well as cases and via examinations, the MD degree in the respective field of study is awarded. In community medicine and medical administration, part I examination consists of a theoretical exam while the degree is conferred after completion of a thesis as a PhD. This thesis has to be completed within a period of five years. After successfully defending the academic thesis, the MD degree is conferred to the candidate. The MD degree holder is certified as a board certified specialist by the respective board of study of the Postgraduate Institute of Medicine after he or she undergoes two–four years of local and foreign training depending on the specialty/subspecialty selected.

=== Research degrees ===
==== United Kingdom, Ireland and some Commonwealth countries ====
The entry-level first professional degree in these countries for the practice of medicine is that of Bachelor of Medicine and Bachelor of Surgery (MBBS, MB, MB BCh BAO, BMBS, MBBChir, or MBChB). This degree typically requires between four and six years of study and clinical training, and is equivalent to the North American MD degree. Due to the UK code for higher education, first degrees in medicine comprise an integrated programme of study and professional practice spanning several levels. These degrees may retain, for historical reasons, "Bachelor of Medicine, Bachelor of Surgery" and are abbreviated to MBChB, MBBS or BMBS.

In the UK, Ireland and many Commonwealth countries, as well as Hong Kong which continues to follow Commonwealth practices, the MD is a postgraduate research degree in medicine. At most universities, this takes the form of a first doctorate, analogous to the PhD, awarded upon submission of a thesis and a successful viva voce. The thesis may consist of new research undertaken on a full- or part-time basis, with much less supervision (in the UK) than for a PhD, or a portfolio of previously published work.

In order to be eligible to apply for an MD degree from a UK or Commonwealth University one must hold either a "Bachelor of Medicine, Bachelor of Surgery" (MBBS, MBChB, BMBS for example) degree, or an equivalent U.S.-MD degree and must usually have at least five years of postgraduate experience. Therefore, graduates from the MBBS/MBChB/BMBS degrees do not hold doctorates; however, physicians holding these degrees are referred to as "doctor" as they are fully licensed as medical practitioners. In some commonwealth nations, these interns are designated as "house officers".

Traditionally, the MD in the UK and Commonwealth was a higher doctorate (similar to a DSc) awarded upon submission of a portfolio of published work representing a substantial contribution to medical research. Many universities have now changed its status, but this has happened only recently: for example, the University of Cambridge in 2012 introduced a new higher degree of MedScD (more akin to the ScD degree) awarded on the basis of a career's contribution to the science or art of medicine, while redesignating the MD as an initial research doctorate awarded on the basis of a thesis. Oxford, which had changed the regulations for the MD degree to bring it more in line with initial doctorates in 2002, removed its status as a higher doctorate after a review in 2016. Some Commonwealth institutions retain the MD as a higher degree, such as the relatively new James Cook University.

In the case where the MD is awarded (either as a first or higher doctorate) for previously published research, the candidate is usually required to be either a graduate or a full-time member of staff, of several years' standing of the university in question.

=== Equivalent degrees in other countries ===
- In Belgian medical education, in the first three years, which are theoretical in nature and lead to a university bachelor's degree, general scientific courses are taken such as chemistry, biophysics, physiology, biostatistics, anatomy, virology, etc. To enter the bachelor course in Flanders, prospective students have to pass an exam, as a result of the numerus clausus. After the bachelor courses, students are allowed to enter the 'master in medicine' courses, which consist of three years of theoretical and clinical study. In general, the first two master years are theoretical and teach the students human pathology, diseases and pharmacology. The third year consists of internships in a wide range of specialities in different clinics. The seventh, final year serves as a kind of 'pre-specialization' year in which the students are specifically trained in the specialty they wish to pursue after medical school.
- In Bangladesh, the basic medical degree is the MBBS. After completing the intermediate level of education (12 years) the candidate must undergo 5 years of medical training in any medical college to achieve the MBBS degree. After obtaining the degree, the candidate needs to undergo one year of internship to obtain BMDC (Bangladesh medical and dental council) accreditation in order to practice in the country.
- In mainland China, some medical schools award MBBS to foreign students while all medical schools award Bachelor of Medicine to nationals. Some MD degrees are higher academic research degrees.
- In Colombia, the medicine faculties of the universities awards the title of "Medico Cirujano" after taking 12 semesters of studies on "all clinic and surgery discipline a two semester on internship. After receiving the degree there is a mandatory year "obliged social work" were the doctors practice as GP in the countryside. Residency programs last between three–four years depends on the specialty.
- The Czech and Slovak title MUDr. (Medicinae Universae doctor or doktor medicíny) is a professional doctorate granted upon completion of six years pregraduate Master's study at medical schools. The postgraduate academic research degree in medicine is a PhD degree.
- The Danish and Norwegian Candidatus medicinae or Candidata medicinae degrees (cand. med.) is awarded after completing a six-year medical programme, to which students apply directly upon finishing secondary school. The programme usually includes a small thesis. However, the cand. med. degree must not be confused with the Danish and Norwegian Dr. Med. degree, which is a separate degree from the PhD and represents a higher degree of medical research experience. It typically consists of at least 5–6 original publications.
- In Finland, the duration of basic medical education is six years and the course leads to the degree of Licentiate of Medicine.
- In Greece, after a six-year study, a medical student acquires his medical degree and the right to use "Δρ.", (Dr.) before his name. This is considered equivalent to the MD title.
- In Kosovo, there are medical high schools. Students from elementary school can choose to attend the medical high school, which lasts three years. When they finish the three years of medical high school, they practice for 4 months. After that, they can be a nurse or they can go to medical facilities in Pristina, with the education there taking around six years, including practice, to become a doctor.
- In Mexico and Peru, schools of medicine award the "Título de Médico Cirujano" degree after completing either six or seven years of study. This curriculum includes a rotating internship year and a year of social service providing care to an underserved community.
- In Nepal, a MBBS degree is awarded. This is an undergraduate level degree, which is awarded after completion of 4 1/2 years of medical school followed by one year of clinical internship. Most medical schools also offer postgraduate MD and MS degrees, which requires three years of further training. Post-doctorate DM and MCh terminal degrees are awarded by a few elite institutions after three more years of super-speciality training.
- In the Netherlands, medical students receive six years of university education prior to their graduation. Prospective students can apply for medical education directly after finishing the highest level of secondary school, vwo; previous undergraduate education is not a precondition for admittance. Medical students receive three years of preclinical training, followed by three years of clinical training (co-assistentschappen, or co-schappen) in hospitals. At one medical faculty (Utrecht University), clinical training already begins in the third year of medical school. After six years, students graduate as basisartsen (non-specialized physicians). As a result of the Bologna process, medical students in the Netherlands receive a bachelor's degree (BSc) after successfully concluding three years of medical university curriculum, and a master's degree (MSc) upon graduation. After graduation, physicians may choose to apply for and complete a research doctorate, earning them a PhD in Medicine. In international communication, Dutch medical graduates may identify themselves as MD. Whilst this title is neither officially awarded nor regulated in the Netherlands, its use is legally permitted.
- In Portugal, to practice medicine, a master's degree in medicine (awarded after a six-year Integrated master's program in medicine) is mandatory. Before the 2007 Bologna Process, the same course was only a Licentiate Degree. After the six-year program, students must go through the National Seriation Exam (Prova Nacional de Seriação), and then a year of General Medical Internship (Ano Comum). When the internship ends, the students are placed in their choice of Medical Specialty, according to their ranking in the aforementioned Exam and the vacancies available for each medical specialty. Only when each student finishes the Medical Internship, will they be allowed to practice medicine without supervision. Entry to the Integrated Masters Program in Medicine is done directly after high school, based on the student's grade – each year there are about 1800 new Medical Students in Portugal, in eight different Medical Schools.
- In Sudan the awarded degree in most of the medical schools is, Bachelor of Medicine and Basic Surgery (MBBS). In schools that are based on the English system of medical teaching, the degree is granted after six years of studying. As for the schools that are adopting the American system, they grant their students the degree of MBBS in only five years.
- In Sweden, medical education begins with a five-and-a-half-year undergraduate university program including the successful completion of examinations, which includes both theoretical and practical elements. Depending upon university, a research thesis must also be completed during this time. This leads to the degree "Master of Science in Medicine" (Swedish: Läkarexamen). Following this, the National Board of Health and Welfare requires a minimum of 18 months of clinical internship (Swedish: AT (Allmäntjänstgöring)) before granting a medical license (Swedish: Läkarlegitimation) to be fully qualified as the Swedish equivalent to Medical Doctor (MD). This internship consists of surgery (3–6 months), internal medicine (3–6 months), psychiatry (three months) and family medicine (six months). Upon receiving a license to practice, a physician is able to apply for a post to start specialist training. There are currently 52 recognised medical specialties in Sweden. The specialist training (Swedish: ST (Specialiseringstjänstgöring)) has a duration of minimum five years, which upon completion grants formal qualification as a specialist.

=== Other postgraduate clinical degrees ===
There is also a similar advanced professional degree to the postgraduate MD: the Master of Surgery (usually ChM or MS, but MCh in Scotland, Ireland, Wales and at Oxford and MChir at Cambridge). The equivalence of these degrees, but their differing names, prevents the need for surgeons (addressed as Mr. in the UK) having to revert to the title Dr., which they once held as new MBBS graduates.

In Ireland, where the basic medical qualification includes a degree in obstetrics, there is a similar higher degree of Master of the Art of Obstetrics (MAO). A Master of Midwifery was formerly examined by the Worshipful Society of Apothecaries of London (hence MMSA) but fell into abeyance in the 1960s; in this case, the term Master referred not to a university degree but rather a professional rank that is common among craft guilds.

In East Africa, the medical schools in Kenya, Tanzania and Uganda award the degree of Master of Medicine (MMed) degree in both surgical and medical specialty disciplines following a three to six-year period of instruction. In Ethiopia students first finish high school then take a university entrance exam then based on their result (it is highly competitive) then start medical school. Recently, there is a further requirement to take another one year in university studying a common course and then take another exam to join medicine. After that the students begins studying preclinical medicine for three years studying anatomy, physiology, biochemistry, histology, embryology, pathology, pharmacology, microbiology and other minor courses of public health then at 4th year students join the clinical rotation ranging from physical examination and history taking to different specialities like internal medicine, surgery, paediatrics, and obstetrics and gynaecology for two years, and other minor specialities like psychiatry, ophthalmology, dermatology, ENT. After finishing these courses students take a qualification exam and become intern doctors for one year, before graduating as a general practitioner and serving two or more years in primary hospitals. They can then take a national residency exam, and pending good results, join their speciality.

In West Africa, the West African College of Physicians and the West African College of Surgeons award the Fellowship of the West African College of Physicians (FWACP) and the Fellowship of the West African College of Surgeons (FWACS) in medical and surgical disciplines respectively after a minimum of four-year residency training period.

The Doctor of Osteopathic Medicine or DO degree allows the same practice rights in the United States and Canada to the MD degree and Doctors of Osteopathic Medicine are fully licensed physicians. Holders of the MD degree must pass MD level board exams while DO holders can pass either the DO (COMLEX) exam or MD exam (USMLE). Similarly, MDs must attend MD rated residency and fellowship programs while DOs can attend either MD programs or Osteopathic (DO) programs. As a result of this, the Accreditation Council for Graduate Medical Education (ACGME) are currently transitioning to a single accreditation system for medical residencies in the U.S. The American MD degree is also recognized by most countries in the world, while DO physicians are only licensed to practice the full scope of medicine and surgery in approximately 50 countries, as of 2012, with partial rights in a number of other nations.

== See also ==
- Bachelor of Medicine, Bachelor of Surgery
- Pre-medical
- Doctor of Medicine in Ayurveda
- MD (Homeopathy)
