= National Institute of Unani Medicine =

Indian research organization

- Type: Unani medical school
- Established: 1984
- Affiliations: Ministry of Ayush
- Academic affiliations: Rajiv Gandhi University of Health Sciences
- Director: Prof. Saiyad Shah Alam
- Location: Kottigepalya, Magadi Main Road, Bangalore, Karnataka, 560091, India
- Campus: Urban
- Nickname: NIUM
- Website: www.nium.in

National Institute of Unani Medicine (NIUM) is an autonomous organization for research and training in Unani medicine in India. It was established in 1984 at Bangalore under the Department of Ayurveda, Yoga and Naturopathy, Unani, Siddha and Homoeopathy (AYUSH), Ministry of Health and Family Welfare, Govt. of India, in a joint venture with Government of Karnataka.

Academic activities were started in the year 2004.

It is affiliated with Rajiv Gandhi University of Health Sciences (RGUHS), Bangalore, Karnataka and offers postgraduate courses (MD in Unani) in ten different subjects:

1. Moalajat (general Medicine),
2. Ilmul Advia (Pharmacology),
3. Tahaffuzi wa Samaji Tib (Preventive and Social medicine),
4. Ilmul Qabalat wa Amraze Niswan (Obstetrics & Gynaecology),
5. Ilmul Saidla (Pharmacy),
6. Ilmul Jrahat (Surgery),
7. Ilaj bit Tadbeereer (Regiminal therapy),
8. Kulliyat (Basic Principles),
9. Mahiyatul Amraz (Pathology) and
10. Amraze Jild wa Mafasil (Dermatology and Rheumatology).

== See also ==
- Central Research Institute of Unani Medicine
