= National Institute of Ayurveda =

Research institute of Ayurveda in India

- Type: Deemed ayurveda university
- Established: 7 February 1976; 50 years ago
- Director: Sanjeev Sharma
- Students: 705 (as of 2020)
- Undergraduates: 349
- Postgraduates: 307
- Doctoral students: 49
- Location: Jaipur, Rajasthan, India; 26°56′04″N 75°49′56″E
- Campus: Urban
- Website: www.nia.nic.in

The National Institute of Ayurveda (abbreviated as NIA) is a research institute of Ayurvedic medicine, located in Jaipur, Rajasthan, India.

== History ==
The early institute was established as an independent Ayurvedic College by Government of Rajasthan in 1946, which was later transformed in to the National Institute of Ayurveda by the government of India. The institute was established on 7 February 1976 in Jaipur as an autonomous institute. On 13 November 2020, the Indian government announced that the NIA was Deemed to be University under De-novo category providing teaching, clinical training, conducting research and providing quality patient care services in the field of Ayurveda in India.

The institute was designated as one of nine national institutes established in India, for training and research in AYUSH systems of medicine by the Ministry of AYUSH. The institute offers a Bachelor of Ayurvedic Medicine and Surgery (BAMS) degree, a post graduation MD (Ayurveda) and post-doctoral degree Ph.D. (Ayurveda) in 14 specialties.

== See also ==
- National Research Institute for Panchakarma
- All India Institute of Ayurveda, Delhi
