= Kotecha =

Kotecha is an Indian surname. These people most often come under the Lohana clan of the Hindu religion and follow the Vaishnav tradition. Some of the families are Sthanakwasi Jain based in Maharashtra, They are basically a business community and their ancestors were traditionally merchants based out of the western states of India like Gujarat, Maharashtra and Rajasthan. They speak Gujarati, Kutchi, Marwari or Marathi language as their mother tongue. The Kotecha community is spread across the world.

Notable people with this surname include:

- Rajesh Kotecha (born 1963), Indian physician
- Savan Kotecha, American songwriter and record producer
- Sima Kotecha, British journalist
