= North Eastern Institute of Ayurveda and Homeopathy =

Indian research institute

North Eastern Institute of Ayurveda & Homoeopathy
- Type: Autonomous Health Institute (Central govt.)
- Established: 2015
- Parent institution: Ministry of AYUSH
- Academic affiliations: North-Eastern Hill University
- Director: Dr. Neeta Mahesekar
- Undergraduates: 63 per year
- Postgraduates: NA
- Location: Mawdiangdiang, Shillong, Meghalaya; 25.5945°N 91.9483°E
- Campus: Sub urban
- Acronym: NEIAH
- Website: neiah.nic.in

North Eastern Institute of Ayurveda & Homoeopathy (NEIAH) is an autonomous institute under the Ministry of AYUSH, within the government of India. It is situated at Mawdiangdiang, Shillong, Meghalaya. It was formally inaugurated by Union Minister of State for Ayush Shripad Yesso Naik on 22 December 2016. Now from session 2019-20 seats have been increased to 63 per year for both the colleges.

The Institute offers a five and a half year course in Bachelor of Ayurvedic Medicine and Surgery and Bachelor of Homeopathic Medicine and Surgery including one year of compulsory internship.
