= Surendra Dubey =

Indian poet (1953–2025)

- सुरेंद्र दुबे
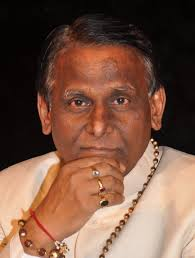
- Born: 8 August 1953; Bemetara, Madhya Pradesh, India
- Died: 26 June 2025 (aged 71); Raipur, Chhattisgarh, India
- Occupations: Poet; Ayurvedic practitioner
- Awards: Hasya Ratna Award (2008); Hasya Shiromani Award (2019)
- Honours: Padma Shri (2010); Chhattisgarh Ratna Award

Surendra Dubey (8 August 1953 – 26 June 2025) was an Indian poet, writer and politician of comic poems. An ayurvedic physician by profession, Dubey was born on 8 August 1953 at Bemetra, Durg, in then non–divided state of Madhya Pradesh. He authored five books and appeared on several stage and television shows. In 2010, the Government of India awarded him the Padma Shri, India's fourth highest civilian award. He was also a recipient of the Hasya Ratna Award from Kaka Hathsri in 2008. He joined the Bharatiya Janata Party in 2018 in the presence of Amit Shah.

== Early life and education ==
Surendra Dubey was born on 8 January 1953 in Bemetara, Durg district, then part of Madhya Pradesh (now in Chhattisgarh), India. He trained and worked professionally as an Ayurvedic physician before rising to fame as a poet and humourist.

== Literary career ==
Dubey became known for his hasya-kavita (comic and satirical poetry), performing at numerous stage shows and appearing on television. He authored five books blending humour with social commentary, like during the COVID‑19 pandemic, his poem encouraging laughter—and thus immunity—went viral, offering hope in tough times.

== Political career ==
Although supportive of the Bharatiya Janata Party for years through his public performances, Dubey officially joined the party only in September 2018 in a ceremony attended by then Party President Amit Shah and CM Raman Singh at Raipur ahead of the 2018 elections. His stature as a respected cultural figure was seen as a strategic asset to the party, bridging social divides and uplifting Chhattisgarhi identity.

== Personal life and death ==
An Ayurvedic practitioner by training, Dubey balanced medicine and verse throughout his life. In early January 2018, a death hoax circulated on social media claiming he had died, mistaking him for another poet. Dubey himself laughed off the rumours, clarifying he was alive and well.

On 26 June 2025, Dubey died from a heart attack at the Advanced Cardiac Institute in Raipur. He was 71. His last rites was done at Marwadi Shamshan Ghat of Raipur attended by several personalities like Kumar Vishwas, Vijay Sharma, Raman Singh, Santosh Pandey.

== Awards and recognition ==
The Padma Shri was awarded to him by the Government of India in 2010 for his contributions to literature. Likewise, the Hasya Ratna Award from Kaka Hathrasi was awarded to him in 2008. Additional literary honours included the Pandit Sundarlal Sharma Award (2012), and a D.Litt degree from Rawatpura Sarkar University, validating his scholarly impact.
