= Intellectual property in India =

Intellectual property in India refers to the patents, copyrights and other intangible assets in India.

India's colonial history has significantly influenced its intellectual property (IP) laws. During British rule, India adopted several legal frameworks based on British laws, including those related to intellectual property. The first copyright law in India, for example, was the Copyright Act of 1847, which was essentially an extension of the British Copyright Act 1842.

After gaining independence in 1947, India began to develop its own legal systems and policies, but the foundation laid during the colonial period continued to shape its approach to intellectual property. The Indian Patent Act of 1970 and the Copyright Act of 1957, for example, were influenced by earlier British laws but were modified to suit India's socio-economic needs and priorities.

India's colonial history also influenced its approach to IP in terms of balancing the rights of creators with the needs of the public. The emphasis on access to knowledge and affordable medicines, for example, can be traced back to the colonial experience of dealing with monopolies and restrictive practices.

== Government Policy ==
Indian government approved its first Intellectual Property Rights Policy in May 2016.

== Laws ==
=== Copyrights ===
The "Copyright Act, 1957" (as amended by the Copyright Amendment Act 2012) governs the subject of copyright law in India. The history of copyright law in India can be traced back to its colonial era under the British Empire. The Copyright Act, 1957 was the first post-independence copyright legislation in India and the law has been amended six times since 1957. The most recent amendment was in the year 2012, through the Copyright (Amendment) Act 2012.

=== Trademarks ===
"Indian trademark law" statutorily protects trademarks as per the Trademark Act, 1999 and also under the common law remedy of passing off. Statutory protection of trademark is administered by the Controller General of Patents, Designs and Trade Marks, a government agency which reports to the Department of Industrial Policy and Promotion (DIPP), under the Ministry of Commerce and Industry.

=== Patents ===
The Patents Act, 1970 was brought into force on 20 April 1972, and further amendments were carried in 1999, 2002 and 2005. The Patent Rules, 2003 was introduced along with the Patent Act (amendment), 2002 on 20 May 2003, and recent amendments were carried in 2016, and 2017. The Patents (Amendment) Rules 2016 mainly focused on expediting the grant process, benefits to startup, and increase in official fees. Patent filing has increased drastically, with over 138,000 patents filed between 2015–21, with over 85,000 filed in emerging technologies. There is a growing space of research literature about the Indian Patent regime, for example, in the context of how the working of pharmaceutical patents remains low in India, and how the Form 27 amendment does not sync with the reality of how it brings quality to Indian patents.

== Authority ==
The Intellectual Property India is administered by the Office of the Controller General of Patents, Designs & Trade Marks (CGPDTM). This is a subordinate office of the Government of India and administers the Indian law of Patents, Designs, Trade Marks and Geographical Indications.

== Economic Effects of Intellectual Property Reform ==
The economic effects of intellectual property reform in India is a complex subject area, and would require a separate detailed article. A beginning may be made by referring to Sunil Kanwar and Stefan Sperlich (2020), who study the effect of intellectual property reform on technological advancement and productivity increases in manufacturing industry in the emerging market context of India.
