= Bhushan Patwardhan =

Academic, Biomedical Scientist (born 1959)

- Born: Pune, India
- Occupations: Academic, Biomedical Scientist
- Known for: Traditional Medicine Research

Bhushan Patwardhan is an Indian researcher of traditional Indian medical systems, such as Ayurveda. He currently serves as a National Research Professor at the Ministry of Ayush, Government of India, Distinguished Professor at the Interdisciplinary School of Health Sciences, Savitribai Phule Pune University and adjunct professor at National Institute of Complementary Medicine, Western Sydney University, Australia.

== Education and career ==
Patwardhan attended Nutan Marathi Vidyalaya High School, Pune. He obtained a bachelor's degree in science from Fergusson College and a master's degree in biochemistry from the Postgraduate School for Biological Studies, University of Pune. He then obtained his doctoral degree (PhD) from Haffkine Institute and the Department of Botany, Savitribai Phule Pune University, previously known as the University of Pune.

He is known to play an important role in India's push to globalize its traditional medicine. As an Indian scientist, he was featured on the Stanford University's global list of 2% scientists curated by the Stanford University experts on the basis of standardized citation indicators like information on citations, h-index, co-authorship, and a composite indicator.

He previously served as the chairman of the executive committee, National Assessment and Accreditation Council (NAAC), Bengaluru, Chairman Additional Charge, Indian Council of Social Science Research, ICSSR New Delhi, and Vice Chairman, University Grants Commission UGC, New Delhi,. He served as the Director of Interdisciplinary School of Health Science and Center for Complementary & Integrative Health, Savitribai Phule Pune University. He was also the Vice Chancellor at Symbiosis International University, and Director at Institute of Ayurveda and Integrative Medicine and Foundation for Revitalisation of Local Health Traditions, Bangalore. He Co-chaired the WHO Expert Group for the Global Center for Traditional Medicine and the First Global Summit on Traditional Medicine. He is part of the task forces and policy-making committees for various organizations like the National Knowledge Commission, Planning Commission, NITI Aayog, and the World Health Organization Geneva.

He is a fellow of the National Academy of Science, India, and the National Academy of Medical Sciences (India).

He is the founder and editor-in-chief of the Journal of Ayurveda and Integrative Medicine, published by Elsevier. He is also on Editorial Boards of Journal of Integrative and Complementary Medicine, Evidence-Based Complementary and Alternative Medicine and various other reputed journals. .

Patwardhan was presented with the SASTRA-Mahamana Award in recognition of his contribution to the field of Ayurveda.

One of his books, "Genome to Om" explores the desired transitions from modern science to metascience. Dr. Vidya Yeravdekar, Principal Director of Symbiosis Society and Pro Chancellor of Symbiosis International University, describes as a profound and enlightening work that redefines the trajectory of human evolution and explores the intersection of science, spirituality, and liberal arts.
