= Government Unani and Ayurvedic Medical College & Hospital =

Medical College and Hospital in Bangladesh

- Type: Medical college; Hospital
- Established: 1989
- Academic staff: 101
- Students: 250 Including 110 female student
- Location: Mirpur-13, Dhaka-1221, Bangladesh; 23.8042°N 90.3780°E
- Campus: 3 Acor; 31 acres
- Website: https://guamc.college.gov.bd/

The Government Unani and Ayurvedic Medical College & Hospital is a graduate, non-profit medical college, and associated hospital, located in Dhaka, Bangladesh. It was established on 10 March 1989, This medical college is affiliated with the University of Dhaka.

There are two courses BUMS (Bachelor of Unani Medicine & Surgery) and BAMS (Bachelor of Ayurvedic Medicine & Surgery) 5 years with 1-year internship are affiliated with medicine faculty of Dhaka University.

The college has its own anatomy museum, physiology & pathology practical lab, Unani Adviyah museum with air-conditioned, Ayurvedic Drobyaguna museum with air-conditioned, garden of three herbal medicinal plants, air-conditioned library & projector room, computer lab with internet connection, college student council, internee doctors' association (IDA), college central mosque, general hospital including 150 beds, drug production house DIMC debate club. Two college halls for boys & girls, a teacher's quarters & a staff quarters, etc.

== Subjects ==
- Anatomy
- Physiology
- Biochemistry
- Pharmacology & Pharmacognosy
- Pathology & Microbiology
- Pharmacy & Pharmaceutics
- Community Medicine
- Forensic Medicine & Toxicology
- Medicine & allied subjects
- Obstetrics & Gynaecology
- Paediatrics
- Surgery
- ENT
- Basic principles of unani and ayurveda
