= Rajesh Kotecha =

Indian Ayurveda physician (born 1963)

Rajesh Kotecha (born 18 July 1963) is an Indian Ayurveda physician who received a Padmashri Award for Medicine in 2015. He was appointed Secretary of the Ministry of AYUSH in the Government of India in July 2017, and is the former Vice Chancellor of Gujarat Ayurveda University, Jamnagar, a post he held from 2013 to 2016.

== Education ==
Vaidya Rajesh Kotecha completed his Bachelor of Ayurveda Medicine & Surgery (BAMS) from Gujarat Ayurved University, Jamnagar, in 1985 and his Doctorate in Ayurveda Medicine (M.D. Ayurveda) from Gujarat Ayurveda in 1991.

== Achievements ==
Vaidya Rajesh Kotecha is the author of two books: Concept of Atattvabhinivesha In Ayurveda, which discusses minor psychiatric disorders within Ayurveda parameters, and A Beginner's Guide to Ayurveda, which is about Ayurveda principles and day-to-day life practices to remain healthy. He also received the Global Ayurveda Physician Award in 2007, the Ayurveda Ratna Award in 2008 and Padmashri Award for Medicine in 2015.

He founded Chakrapani Ayurveda Clinic & Research Center in Jaipur in 1998.
