= All India Institute of Ayurveda =

Public medicine institution in New Delhi, India

Coordinates: 28°30′50.57″N 77°17′49.14″E

- Type: Public
- Established: 10 October 2015; 10 years ago
- Parent institution: Ministry of Ayush; Government of India
- Affiliations: University of Delhi.
- Director: Pradeep Kumar Prajapati
- Location: Gautampuri, Sarita Vihar, New Delhi, India
- Campus: Urban
- Website: www.aiia.gov.in

All India Institute of Ayurveda, abbreviated as AIIA, is a public Ayurveda medicine and research institution located in New Delhi, India. The All India Institute of Ayurveda (AIIA) is an apex autonomous body under the Ministry of Ayush, established to serve as a center of excellence for the traditional Indian medical system of Ayurveda. OPD of all India Institute of Ayurveda Inaugurated CCRAS - Shreedhareeyam Ayurvedic eye care facility Inaugurated]

The All India Institute of Ayurveda has been conceived as an Apex Institute for Ayurveda. It aims at bringing a synergy between Traditional Wisdom of Ayurveda and Modern tools and technology. The institute would offer postgraduate and doctoral courses in various disciplines of Ayurveda and will focus on fundamental research of Ayurveda, drug development, standardization, quality control, safety evaluation and scientific validation of Ayurvedic medicine.

Institute has a 200 bed referral hospital for facilitating clinical research. The Institute has 25 Specialty Departments and 12 clinics with 8 inter-disciplinary research laboratories wherein several Scholars have access for PG & Ph.D programs every year. The hospital will be equipped with state of the art modern diagnostic tools and techniques which is used in teaching, training and research. The patient care is done primarily through Ayurveda of tertiary level. This institute also have an international collaborative centre for global promotion and research in Ayurveda.

== History ==
The proposal for the establishment of AIIA at New Delhi originated from then-Prime Minister Atal Bihari Vajpayee's declaration to establish a state-of-the-art National Ayurveda Hospital at the ceremony of Vaidya Ram Narayan Sharma Memorial Award Distribution on 5 May 2000, under the aegis of All India Ayurveda Congress.

The cornerstone of the institute was laid in 2007 upon approval of the Ministry of Finance in 2003. The Government of India recommended the proposal to develop the institute focused on R&D, safety evaluation, and quality standards of Ayurveda medicines. The institute has been providing out-patient services since 2009. In 2014, the Government of India established the Ministry of Ayush and AIIA Delhi, an autonomous institute under the Ministry of Ayush. AIIA was first inaugurated in October 2010. Prime Minister of India, Narendra Modi, inaugurated the Institute for a second time in 2017.

AIIA is the publisher of the Journal of Ayurveda Case Reports (AyuCaRe), a quarterly peer-reviewed journal.

== List of Institutes ==
Currently the only AIIA is the AIIA Delhi. A satellite center of AIIA Delhi was established in Goa. In the 2026 Union budget of India, it was announced to create 3 new AIIA.

== See also ==
- Institute of Teaching and Research in Ayurveda
- National Institute of Ayurveda
- National Research Institute for Panchakarma
