= National Intellectual Property Rights Policy =

2016 Indian policy

National Intellectual Property Rights Policy was approved by the Indian cabinet on 12 May 2016 to ensure compliance to the Doha Development Round and TRIPS Agreement. With its seven objectives, it aims at creating a "“Creative India; Innovative India".
