= Mohan D. Nair =

Indian pharmaceutical scientist

Mohan D. Nair is an Indian pharmaceutical scientist whose areas of specialty includes patents, documentation and information management for the pharmaceutical industry, and the evaluation and development of biotechnology. Nair was a consultant to the pharmaceutical industry in India and the World Health Organization, and is the current director of Sami Labs Ltd.

He has been credited with providing visionary and innovative approaches through his publications and presentations at national and international conferences, and with developing the Indian industry towards becoming a global player in research, technology development, and production.

== Career ==
Nair received his Ph.D. degree in organic chemistry from the University of Illinois. He was part of the first batch of Fulbright Scholars from India, a Fellow of the National Research Council of Ottawa and the Alfred P. Sloan Research Foundation and a research associate at University of Illinois before becoming part of the Pharmaceutical Research Group of CIBA Limited, Switzerland, and later of the CIBA-GEIGY Research Centre in Bombay. He worked extensively on new drug development, patents, documentation and information systems and planning & control of production, marketing and clinical trials.

He subsequently became the vice president of SPIC, one of the largest antibiotic complexes in India, and had an instrumental role in setting up SPIC's state-of-the-art Pharmaceutical R&D Centre, a unit for production of Medical Devices for cardiovascular surgery, a multi-purpose plant for bulk drugs manufacture, a drug formulations plant and all the other operations of the Pharmaceuticals Division.

Nair has since retired from SPIC, but continues to be an active spokesman for the Indian pharmaceutical industry, participating actively in industry affairs. Nair is an elected Fellow of the Indian National Academy of Engineering and a visiting faculty member of various management institutes and research institutions in India.

Nair continues to be a consultant to healthcare industries, healthcare service providers, including hospitals, national and international organisations, healthcare policy-making bodies etc. He is passionate to develop products and practices based on traditional medical systems, notably Ayurveda, and is involved in many projects connected with the promotion of such systems globally to complement current modern medical products and services.

== Contributions to the pharmaceutical industry ==
Nair has served as a consultant and advisor to organisations that include government and private organisations on science & technology, as well as the World Health Organization. He was also a member on three pharmaceutical task forces: the Delegation to USSR, the High Power Delegation and the Task Forces for the Government of Andhra Pradesh, Gujarat, Kerala and Tamil Nadu.

He served as a director on the boards of many pharmaceutical companies, and on various governing councils of academic entities, universities and medical research facilities, including the All-India Council of Technical Education, the Export Promotion Council of India. These roles include being president of the Indian Penicillin Manufacturers Association and a member of the executive committees of Organization of Pharmaceutical Producers of India and Indian Drug Manufacturers Association.

Currently, Nair is a member of the central council of VHS Hospital in Chennai. He is also the chairman of the Bahuleyan Charitable Foundation, running their super specialty neurosurgical hospitals in Kerala. At the same time, he serves as an advisor to the Apollo Hospitals Educational & Research Foundation.

He has also received awards for his contribution to the Indian pharmaceutical industry.

== Works ==
Nair is the author of Indian Pharmaceutical Market Guide 1998 published by PJB Publications, London, and was a contributor to the textbook International Business Law published by ITP Washington. He has written over 80 publications in various national and international journals and has co-authored three books published by Academic Press, John Wiley & Sons, and Birkhauser respectively. He also holds several patents on new therapeutic agents. He has written five books, among them: "Fifty Years in the Indian Pharmaceutical Industry" (2019), and "Thank You God for a Life to Remember" (2024), a memoir detailing Nair's 95-year life and career.

== Personal life ==
Dr. Nair was born in 1929 in Kerala, India. He has two children with his wife Vijaya Nair, Sheila and Vinod, and six grandchildren.
