= Ministry of Ayush =

Indian government ministry for alternative medicine systems

- Branch of Government of India

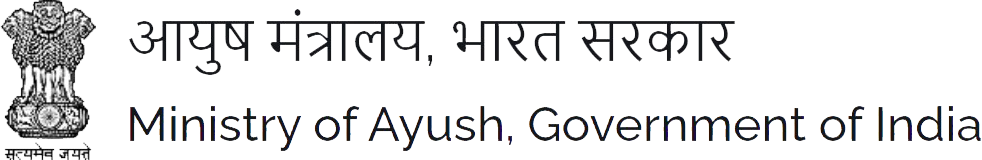
- Ministry of Ayush

Ministry overview
- Formed: 9 November 2014 (12 years ago)
- Preceding agencies: Department of Indian System of Medicine and Homoeopathy (March 1995); Department of AYUSH (2003)
- Jurisdiction: Government of India
- Annual budget: ₹4,408.93 crore (US$470 million) (FY2026–27)
- Minister responsible: Prataprao Ganpatrao Jadhav, Minister of State (Independent Charge)
- Ministry executive: Rajesh Kotecha, Secretary
- Website: ayush.gov.in

The Ministry of Ayush is a ministry of the Government of India, responsible for education, research, and propagation of traditional and alternative medicine systems in India. Ayush is an acronym devised from the names of the alternative healthcare systems covered by the ministry: ayurveda, yoga and naturopathy, Unani, Siddha, and homeopathy.

The Department of Indian Systems of Medicine and Homeopathy (ISM&H) was first established in 1995 under the Ministry of Health and Family Welfare by the then Narasimha Rao government. ISM&H was renamed as the Department of AYUSH in 2003. The department was made into an official ministry in 2014.

The ministry has been accused of promoting pseudoscience as most of the practices regulated are pseudoscientific. It has faced significant criticism for funding systems that lack biological plausibility and are either untested or conclusively proven as ineffective. Quality of research has been poor, and drugs have been launched without rigorous pharmacological studies and meaningful clinical trials on ayurveda or other alternative healthcare systems.

== History ==
=== Emphasis on indigenous healthcare models ===
Successive Five-Year Plans of India (produced by the Planning Commission of India) allotted considerable focus to alternative, especially indigenous, forms of medicine within the healthcare sector. The Government of India set up a number of committees for healthcare sector development, including Bhore (1946), Mudaliar (1961), and Srivastava (1975), that emphasized the need for improvement of traditional systems of Indian medicine. The National Health Policy (1983), National Education Policy in Health Sciences (1989), and National Health Policy (2002) further elaborated on the role of the Indian System of Medicine (ISM) and Homeopathy (H) as a means to facilitate healthcare access in rural areas where many Indians lack adequate health services.

=== Educational courses and ISM&H ===
A diploma course in ayurveda was launched in the third (1961–1966) five-year plan. The Central Council of Indian Medicine was established in 1971. followed by Central Council of Homeopathy in 1973. The sixth (1980–1985) and seventh (1985–1990) five-year plans aimed at developing novel ISM&H drugs. The eighth (1992–1997) five-year plan lent considerable emphasis on the mainstreaming of Ayush. The Department of Indian System of Medicine and Homeopathy was launched in March 1995, under the Ministry of Health and Family Welfare.

The ninth five-year plan (1998–2002) ensured for its integration with western medicine. It was the first to tackle different aspects of the Ayush system in a standalone manner which focused on overall development including investment in human resource development, preservation and cultivation of medicinal plants, establish a more complete pharmacopoeia, and outline good manufacturing processes. The acronym AYUSH was devised in 2003. The department of Indian System of Medicine and Homeopathy was renamed the department of AYUSH in November 2003.

The National Rural Health Mission was launched in 2005 with the stated aim of integrating Ayush practitioners into national health programs, including in primary health care (Ayush medical officers at community health centers, para-professionals et al.) and to provide support for research in the field. The National Rural Health Mission listed the mainstreaming of Ayush as one of its priorities.

=== After 2014 ===
Observers noted an increased focus on Ayush healthcare after the 2014 Indian general elections, which brought the Bharatiya Janata Party (BJP) to power. On 9 November 2014 the previous government department for traditional Indian medicine was elevated by the administration of Narendra Modi into a standing ministry that includes the promotion of yoga practice and the use of Ayurvedic products. The allotted budget for Ayush had more than doubled since 2013–14, and stood at ₹ 1428.7 crore for 2017–18.

== Activities ==
=== Healthcare ===
The ministry runs multiple healthcare programs; primarily aimed at the rural population.

Ayush is supposed to form an integral backbone of the Ayushman Bharat Yojana and the ministry had long worked for integrating the different systems of Ayush with modern medicine, in what has been described as 'a type of "cross-pathy"'. More than 50,000 children have been enrolled in 'Homeopathy for Healthy Child'. It observes different days to raise general awareness about Ayush and promote each of the systems.

The ministry had collaborated with the Council for Scientific and Industrial Research (CSIR) to set up the Traditional Knowledge Digital Library (TKDL) in 2001, on codified traditional knowledge on Indian systems of medicines such as ayurveda, Unani, Siddha and yoga as a means of preventing grant of "bed" patents on traditional knowledge and thus counter biopiracy.

=== Institutions ===
The ministry is also at the aegis of several professional research institutes and academic faculties devoted to various forms of alternative medicine:

- Institute of Teaching and Research in Ayurveda, Jamnagar - Established on 2020 in Jamnagar as an Institute of National Importance poised to take Ayurveda education to new vistas, it added.
- National Institute of Homeopathy - Established on 10 December 1975 in Kolkata as an autonomous organization under the Ministry of Health and Family Welfare. Conducts degree course in Homeopathy (UG since 1987 and PG since 1998); affiliated to the West Bengal University of Health Sciences.
- National Institute of Siddha - Was established at Chennai for an estimated cost of ₹ 470 million; inaugurated in November 2005. A joint venture between Government of India and Government of Tamil Nadu, the proposal was approved, in principle, during the ninth five-year plan period. Affiliated to the government-owned Tamil Nadu Dr. M.G.R. Medical University and also the national headquarters of the Central Council of Research in Siddha (CCRS). Has an attached hospital—Ayothidoss Pandithar Hospital; on an average, 2,174 patients were reported per day (2017–18) whilst there's an in-patient (IP) department with a capacity of 120 beds. Further expansions are in progress.
- National Institute of Unani Medicine - Established in 1984 at Bangalore, as a joint venture between Government of India and Government of Karnataka. Initially offered research facilities but academic courses were set up from 2004. Currently offers post graduate courses (MD in Unani) in eight different specialties; affiliated to Rajiv Gandhi University of Health Sciences.
- National Research Institute for Panchakarma - Set up in 1971 at Cheruthuruthy. Undertakes research activities as well as provides professional and academic training. The institute comes under the Central Council for Research in Ayurveda and Siddha (CCRAS) of the Ayush.
- National Institute of Ayurveda - Deemed university Set up in 1976 at Jaipur, by the Ministry of Health & Family Welfare; a refurbished extension of the Government Ayurvedic College, Jaipur which was established by the Government of Rajasthan in 1946. Offers research as well academic facilities; affiliated with Dr. Sarvepalli Radhakrishnan Rajasthan Ayurved University.
- All India Institute of Ayurveda - Established in 2009 at Delhi; offers research as well academic facilities. Brainchild of Atal Bihari Vajpayee. Runs a secondary institute Rashtriya Ayurved Vidyapeeth.
- National Institute of Naturopathy -
- National Institute For Sowa Rigpa -
- Morarji Desai National Institute of Yoga - The institute promotes yoga philosophy and facilitates training and advanced research. It was established in 1970 as a hospital by the now-defunct Central Council for Research in Indian Systems of Medicine and Homeopathy, under the Vishwayatan Yogashram. The hospital was later transformed into an institute named the Central Research Institute for Yoga (CRIY) in 1976, with the aim of providing free training to individuals and organising research on yoga. In 1988, the institute was renamed to its current title.
- North Eastern Institute of Ayurveda and Homeopathy - Established in 2016 at Mawdiangdiang, Shillong. Offers a four-and-a-half-year degree course in Bachelor of Ayurvedic Medicine and Surgery and Bachelor of Homeopathic Medicine and Surgery.
- North Eastern Institute of Folk Medicine - The NEIFM, Pasighat is an autonomous Institute under the Ministry of Ayush, Government of India. It is located at Pasighat, Arunachal Pradesh.
- Central Council for Research in Homeopathy
- Central Council for Research in Yoga and Naturopathy

The ministry also monitors two semi-autonomous regulatory bodies:-

- Central Council of Indian Medicine (CCIM) - One of the professional councils under the University Grants Commission (UGC) to regulate higher education in Ayurveda, Siddha, Unani and Sowa-Rigpa. It suggests the professional benchmarks and practices for medical professionals in these systems, as well. The Central Council of Indian Medicine (CCIM) Act 1970 (48 of 1970) has been repealed and all the provisions of the National Commission for Indian System of Medicine (NCISM) has been come into force with effect from the 11th day of June 2021.
- National Commission for Homoeopathy - One of the professional councils under the UGC to regulate higher education in Homeopathy. Maintains central registers of homeopaths.

== Economics ==
As of March 2015, there were nearly 800,000 Ayush practitioners, over 90 per cent of whom practiced homeopathy or ayurveda. A 2018 study by the Confederation of Indian Industry (CII) estimated the market share of Ayush medicines at around US$3 billion and that India exported Ayush products of a net worth US$401.68 million in the fiscal year 2016–17.

The Department of Pharmaceuticals had allocated a budget of ₹1.44 billion to the ministry for 2018-2020 for manufacture of alternative medicines. The average expenditure for drugs on Ayush and scientifically based medicine has been found to not vary widely.

== Cabinet Ministers ==
| Portrait | Minister (Birth-Death) Constituency | Term of office | | | Political party | Ministry | Prime Minister |
| Portrait | Minister (Birth-Death) Constituency | From | To | Period | Political party | Ministry | Prime Minister |
|---|---|---|---|---|---|---|---|
| | Shripad Naik (born 1952); MP for North Goa (Minister of State, I/C) | 9 November 2014 | 30 May 2019 | 6 years, 71 days | Bharatiya Janata Party | Modi I | Narendra Modi |
| | Shripad Naik (born 1952); MP for North Goa (Minister of State, I/C) | 31 May 2019 | 7 July 2021 | 6 years, 71 days | Bharatiya Janata Party | Modi II | Narendra Modi |
| | Sarbananda Sonowal (born 1962); Rajya Sabha MP for Assam | 7 July 2021 | 10 June 2024 | 2 years, 339 days | Bharatiya Janata Party | Modi II | Narendra Modi |
| | Prataprao Ganpatrao Jadhav (born 1960); MP for Buldhana (Minister of State, I/C) | 10 June 2024 | Incumbent | 2 years, 163 days | Shiv Sena | Modi III | Narendra Modi |

== Ministers of State ==
| Portrait | Minister (Birth-Death) Constituency | Term of office | | | Political party | Ministry | Prime Minister |
| Portrait | Minister (Birth-Death) Constituency | From | To | Period | Political party | Ministry | Prime Minister |
|---|---|---|---|---|---|---|---|
| | Mahendra Munjapara (born 1968); MP for Surendranagar | 7 July 2021 | 9 June 2024 | 2 years, 338 days | Bharatiya Janata Party | Modi II | Narendra Modi |

== Criticism ==
=== Pseudoscience ===
A strong consensus prevails among the scientific community that homeopathy is a pseudo-scientific, unethical and implausible line of treatment. Ayurveda is deemed to be pseudoscientific but is occasionally considered a protoscience, or trans-science system instead. Naturopathy is considered to be a form of pseudoscientific quackery, ineffective and possibly harmful, with numerous ethical concerns about the practice. Much of the research on postural yoga has taken the form of preliminary studies or clinical trials of low methodological quality; there is no conclusive therapeutic effect except in back pain. Unani lacks biological plausibility and is considered to be pseudoscientific quackery, as well.

There is no credible efficacy or scientific basis for any of these forms of treatment.

==== Research ====
Two systematic reviews, one by The Lancet in 2005 and the other by the Australian government's National Health and Medical Research Council (NHMRC) in 2015, found no evidence that homeopathy was more effective than a placebo. In a comprehensive review of alternative medicine (including ayurveda and homeopathy) conducted in 2000, the UK House of Lords Committee on Science and Technology was unable to find evidence to support the value of these treatments. Randomized control trials or RCTs for ayurveda and homeopathy have been extremely limited as of 2017. Multiple systemic reviews have highlighted several methodological problems with the studies and trials conducted by Ayush and its associates in relation to developing an ayurvedic drug for diabetes. A tendency to publish in dubious predatory journals and non-reproducibility by independent studies has also been noted. The Hindu reported in 2015 that India had yet to conduct a systematic review of any of the systems of medicine under the purview of Ayush.

==== Drugs ====
The ministry (in conjunction with other national laboratories) has been subject to heavy criticism for developing, advocating and commercializing multiple sham-drugs (BGR-34, IME9, Dalzbone, Ayush-64 et al.) and treatment-regimes for a variety of diseases including dengue, chikungunya, swine flu, asthma, autism, diabetes, malaria, AIDS, cancer, COVID-19 and others despite an absence of rigorous pharmacological studies and meaningful clinical trials.

A 2018 systematic review of traditional and AYUSH medicine noted the existing regulations to be inadequate for ensuring the safety, quality, efficacy and standardized rational use of these forms of treatment. Researchers also noted a lack of monitoring for adverse effects from the usage of these drugs and of contraindication trials.

The ministry recommended the herb giloy as an "immune booster against" COVID-19 and issued multiple press releases during the COVID-19 pandemic claiming the herb was safe. Later, multiple cases of liver damage were found in those with a history of giloy consumption. The ministry backed its statement by pointing out that neither the content of the herb usage nor the authenticity of the plant, which could be identified with similar-looking plants, was analyzed.

==== Miscellaneous ====
The Washington Post noted the efforts behind the revival of Ayurveda as a part of the ruling party's rhetoric of restoring India's past glory. It also noted that the Ayurveda industry was largely non-standardized and that its critics associated the aggressive integration of Ayurveda into healthcare services with the Hindu nationalist ideology of the ruling party. There have been allegations coming out of right-to-information requests that it is the Ayush ministries official policy to not hire Muslims as trainers.

Some researchers have argued that the provision of Ayush services is an example of "forced pluralism" which often leads to disbursal of incompetent healthcare services by unqualified practitioners. Ayushman Bharat has been noted to increase privatization of state healthcare facilities and compel rural populace into preferentially choosing alternative medicine, raising concerns about ethics. The proposal of integrating Ayush with western medicine has been criticized. The Indian Medical Association (IMA) has expressed strong opposition to integrated medicine, often by using the term "mixopathy". In 2020 and 2021, the IMA held nationwide protests to demonstrate against federal changes issued by the Ministry of Ayush that permit ayurvedic practitioners to perform minor surgical procedures.

The ministry had attracted widespread criticism after publishing a pamphlet titled Mother and Child Care through Yoga and Naturopathy which asked pregnant women to abstain from eating meat and eggs, shun desire and lust, hang beautiful photos in the bedroom and to nurture spiritual and 'pure' thoughts among other advice. In the aftermath of the COVID-19 pandemic, the ministry recommended Arsenicum album 30 as a preventive drug; the claim was without any scientific basis or evidence, and was widely criticized.

=== Response ===
The ministry rejected the NHMRC's 2016 study on homeopathy which was regarded as the most rigorous and reliable investigation into homeopathy to date. In 2017, the ministry set up a committee at the Central Council for Research in Homeopathy (CCRH) to counter claimed western propaganda against homeopathy; the committee was ill-received.

== Reception ==
An NSSO survey in 2014 found that only 6.9% of the population favored Ayush (3.5% ISM and 3.0% homeopathy) over conventional mainstream medicine and that the urban population was slightly more conducive to seeking Ayush forms of treatment than their rural counterparts; another survey in 2016 reiterated the same findings, approximately. A 2014 study did not report any significant difference between the usage of Ayush services by rural and urban populace, after adjusting for socioeconomic and demographic variables. Low-income households exhibited the highest tendency for Ayush followed by high-income households and on an overall, Ayush lines of treatment were majorly used to treat chronic diseases. The treatments were more used among females in rural India but no gender-differential was observed in the urban populations. Chhattisgarh (15.4%), Kerala (13.7%), and West Bengal (11.6%) displayed the highest Ayush utilization levels.

A 2018 review article noted that the states exhibited differential preference for particular Ayush systems. Ayurveda and Siddha respectively show greater popularities in Kerala and Tamil Nadu. Unani was well received in Hyderabad region and among Muslims whilst homeopathy was highly popular in Bengal and Odisha. It further noted that the preference among the general population for usage of Ayush revolved around a perceived "distrust or frustration with modern medicine, cost effectiveness, accessibility, non-availability of other options and less side effects of Ayush medicines".

== See also ==
- Department of Ayush (Kerala)
