= Journal of Ayurveda and Integrative Medicine =

- Discipline: Alternative medicine
- Language: English
- Edited by: Bhushan Patwardhan

Publication details
- History: 2010–present
- Publisher: Medknow Publications

Standard abbreviations
- ISO 4: J. Ayurveda Integr. Med.

Indexing
- ISSN: 0975-9476 (print); 0976-2809 (web)
- OCLC no.: 668054801

Links
- Journal homepage

The Journal of Ayurveda and Integrative Medicine is a peer-reviewed open-access medical journal on ayurvedic medicine. It was established in 2010. The editor-in-chief is Bhushan Patwardhan. The theory and practice of Ayurveda is pseudoscientific.

== Abstracting and indexing ==
The journal is abstracted and indexed in EBSCO databases and Scopus.
