= Tipu Sultan Unani Medical College =

Coordinates: 17.35858°N 76.85467°E

Tipu Sultan Unani Medical College is a Unani Medical College located in the city of Gulbarga, in the northern part of Karnataka state of India. It is the brainchild of three individuals, who established this institute of Unani medicine. It gives a bachelor level education in the field of Unani medicine. The leaders of this institution are Muhammad Azeemuddin Advocate as its president, Syed Nasrullah Hussaini as its secretary, and Abdul Ghani as its director.

== History ==
It began as a humble structure on land earmarked for it on the Ring Road of Gulbarga city. The first group of students started in these temporary buildings raised for that purpose. Now the new building is an imposing structure with classrooms, a well equipped library, and an herbal garden.

== Recent developments ==
Recently, a modern operation theater with all the facilities of treatment for various specialities like general surgery, orthopaedics, gynaecology and general medicine have been added. It has now become a "Jewel in the Crown" of the institution. Many major surgeries are being conducted in this facility.
