= Institute of Teaching and Research in Ayurveda, Jamnagar =

Educational institution in Gujarat, India

Institute of Teaching and Research in Ayurveda
- Motto: सर्वमूह्यमगाधार्थम् / Sarvamūhyamagādhārtham
- Motto in English: "Profound and limitless knowledge, symbolizing the pursuit of deep wisdom and the exploration of profound truths."
- Type: Public
- Established: 1967; 59 years ago (as University); 2020; 6 years ago (as ITRA)
- Director: Dr. Tanuja Manoj Nesari
- Location: Jamnagar, Gujarat, India
- Campus: Urban
- Mascots: Guru, Knowledge, Nature
- Website: itra.ac.in

Institute of Teaching and Research in Ayurveda (ITRA) Jamnagar, Gujarat, India which was founded in 1967. It has a joint campus with, an Institute of National Importance, established in 2020.

== History ==
In 1940, the erstwhile royal family of Nawanagar State established the Shri Gulabkunverba Ayurveda Society in Nawanagar (now Jamnagar). The Society had translated Charaka Samhita into English, Hindi and Gujarati languages. The society built the Dhanwantari Mandir, a large palatial building, in 1944. The society founded Shri Gulabkunverba Ayurveda Mahavidyalaya, the first Ayurveda college of India, in 1946. Following the independence of India in 1947, the Government of India focused on revival and reorganisation of Ayurveda. On recommendation of the committees established by the government, the Central Institute for Research in Indigenous System of Medicine (CIRISM), the first Ayurveda research institute of India, was founded at Dhanwantari Mandir in 1952. The Centre for PG Studies and Research in Ayurveda (CPGS&RA), the first post-graduate Ayurveda college of India, was established in July 1956. In 1963, Shree Gulabkunverba Ayurveda Mahavidyalaya, CIRISM and CPGS&RA were integrated to create the Institute for Ayurvedic Studies and Research (IASR).

The Gujarat Ayurved University was established in 1967 by an act. The university superseded the IASR and the CPGS&RA was renamed as Institute of Post Graduate Teaching and Research in Ayurveda (IPGT&RA). In 1999, the Indian Institute of Ayurvedic Pharmaceutical Sciences (IIAPS) were established which offers a Diploma in Ayurved Pharmacy. The Maharshi Patanjali Institute for Yoga Naturopathy Education and Research was founded in 2000. The other constituent institutes include the International Center for Ayurvedic Studies and the University School of Continuing Education in Ayurved.

In 2020, Institute of Teaching and Research in Ayurveda (ITRA), an autonomous institute, was established in the university campus which took over all the existing colleges on the campus. It was declared as an institute of national importance dedicated to Ayurvedic studies and research. The ITRA has 12 departments, three clinical laboratories and three research laboratories. About 50 acres were allocated for the college campuses while another 50 acres were allocated for a botanical garden.

In 2021, the act governing the university was repealed and reenacted the Gujarat Ayurved University Act with changes by the Government of Gujarat following establishment of the ITRA. The university continues to govern the affiliated Ayurveda colleges in Gujarat.

== Institutes under ITRA ==
- Shree Gulabkunverba Ayurveda Mahavidyalaya
- Institute of Post Graduate Teaching and Research in Ayurveda
- Indian Institute of Ayurvedic Pharmaceutical Sciences
- Maharshi Patanjali Institute For Yoga Naturopathy Education and Research (now the Department of Swasthavritta)
- International Center for Ayurvedic Studies
- University School of Continuing Education in Ayurved

== Publications ==
Ayu is a quarterly journal published by the ITRA focusing on research, education and propagation of Ayurveda. It was started in 1964.

== Notable alumni ==
- Vd. Rajesh Kotecha – Secretary of Ministry of Ayush
- Vd. Dr. Tanuja Nesari - Director of ITRA Jamnagar
- Prof. Gurdip Singh: Acted as the dean of the Institute for Post Graduate Teaching and Research in Ayurveda (IPGT&RA) at the university and was awarded India's fourth-highest civilian honor in 2020.
- Vd. Pashmina Joshi - Renowned surgeon in ayurveda
- Dr. Vaibhav Dadu – Renowned faculty of Department of basic principles. Published many books includeling Padarth Vijnana, Ayurveda Itihas etc.
- Vd. D.B. Vaghela
- Vd. Rajshree Unadkat
- Vd. Achyuta Girdharbhai Atara - Renowned name in Shalakya Tantra
- Vd. Bhupesh Baghel
