= Bachelor of Ayurveda, Medicine and Surgery =

Ayurvedic medicine degree

Bachelor of Ayurvedic Medicine and Surgery (B.A.M.S.) is a professional degree focused on Ayurveda offered in India, Nepal, Bangladesh, and Sri Lanka.

Ayurveda is a type of alternative medicine, whose theory and practice are pseudoscientific.

== About ==
A 2001 report from the World Health Organization noted that Ayurveda was widely practiced in India, Nepal, Bangladesh, and Sri Lanka, the four corresponding nations that offer the BAMS degree. Ayurveda was generally not integrated with the national health system of nations outside of the Indian subcontinent.

=== India ===
In India, the curriculum includes the study of Ayurveda and corresponding Ayurvedic subjects such as Rachana Sharira, Kriya Sharira, Dravyuaguna, Svasthavritta and Yoga, Roga Nidana and Vikriti Vijnana, Kāyachikitsā, Kaumara Bhritya, Prasuti Tantra, Shalya Tantra, Shalakya Tantra etc. along with human anatomy, physiology, pathology & diagnostic procedures, principles of medicine, pharmacology, toxicology, forensic medicine, E.N.T, gynecology & obstetrics, ophthalmology and principles of surgery from modern medicine. The syllabus also includes ancient and medieval classics, sometimes in the Sanskrit language. Institutions in India that offer the degree include the National Institute of Ayurveda and All India Institute of Ayurveda, Delhi.

In India, a student can go on to earn a master's degree in the form of MD (Ayurveda) and MS (Ayurveda), a PhD, and clinical doctorate degrees in traditional and complementary medicine at the university level. There are also opportunities to perform research, work in hospital and healthcare administration, and in health supervision.

In a report from 2020, the World Health Organization stated there was "a history of combining allopathic and traditional medicine systems in India, including through medical education." The WHO described AYUSH and conventional medical systems as "separate and parallel at the levels of governance, organisation, education and service delivery." A nation-wide survey conducted by the researchers of the Banaras Hindu University in 2009, which included a total of 1022 students and teachers of Ayurveda, revealed that the graduates possessing a BAMS degree generally lack required exposure to essential clinical skills. In another paper derived from the same study, the authors have identified multiple global challenges being faced by the Ayurveda education sector.

== Permission to practice medicine ==
The legal framework governing medical practice in India requires practitioners to practice only in the system of medicine in which they are formally qualified and registered. The Supreme Court of India, in Dr. Mukhtiar Chand & Others v. State of Punjab & Others (1998), held that AYUSH practitioners cant prescribe allopathic medicines. However the ruling so stated that AYUSH doctors can prescribe allopathic medicine if the state government have issued notifications permitting it limited prescription of specified allopathic medicines.

There are more than 13 states where BAMS doctors can prescribe allopathic medicine including Assam, Tamilnadu, Maharastra, Himachal Pradesh and Andra Pradesh. BAMS doctors are permitted to prescribe allopathic medicine and perform minor surgeries. in the state of Maharashtra following protest by BAMS doctors In the state of Karnataka, BAMS doctors appointed in primary health centres in rural areas can practice modern-medicine in case of "emergencies".

The State of Kerala has generally maintained a restrictive regulatory approach toward BAMS doctors prescribing allopathic medicine. During the COVID-19 pandemic, the state government issued directions instructing AYUSH practitioners not to prescribe modern medicines for treatment of COVID-19 unless specifically authorised, and limited their role primarily to preventive and immunity-related interventions The Kerala High Court also addressed issues relating to AYUSH practitioners prescribing or advertising medicines for COVID-19 treatment, emphasising restrictions under applicable regulatory frameworks. The court also ruled that they can prescribe allopathic medicine in emergencies as life-saving treatment.
