= Doctor of Medicine in Ayurveda =

Degree in Indian alternative medicine

The Doctor of Medicine in Ayurveda (MD Ayurveda) or Ayurveda Vachaspati is a three-year masters-level course in the alternative medical system of Ayurveda. It is offered in some medical colleges in India and Sri Lanka. Selection to the course is generally done by a competitive national-level written entrance examination known as the All India AYUSH Post Graduate Entrance Test (AIAPGET), which is open to candidates with a Bachelor of Ayurveda, Medicine, and Surgery.

Courses within the program include Ayurvedic medical jurisprudence, toxicology, pediatrics, internal medicine, pathology, anatomy, physiology, gynaecology, obstetrics, surgery, otorhinolaryngology, and ophthalmology.
