= Brihans Natural Products =

Indian consumer goods company

Brihans Natural Products Ltd.
- Type: Company limited by shares
- ISIN: INE04ZC01014
- Industry: Ayurvedic skin care, hair care, and health care products
- Founded: 20 April 2000; 26 years ago
- Founder: Mandar Agashe
- Headquarters: Shaniwar Peth, Pune, Maharashtra, India
- Area served: India; United Arab Emirates; Singapore; Nepal; Malaysia
- Key people: Sheetal Agashe (managing director)
- Products: Gels, moisturizers, shampoos, lotions, ointments, juices, tablets, and herbal medication
- Revenue: IN₹109,558,698 (2022)
- Net income: IN₹12,116,321 (2019)
- Total equity: IN₹250,000,000 Authorised capital; IN₹215,000,000 Share capital; (2017)
- Number of employees: 65 (2023)
- Parent: Brihan Maharashtra Sugar Syndicate Ltd.
- Website: brihansnatural.com

Brihans Natural Products Limited is an Indian consumer goods company headquartered in Pune, Maharashtra. Incorporated on 20 April 2000, it is best known for manufacturing and marketing Ayurvedic skin care, hair care, and health care product ranges, which have received several corporate awards, most notably from The Economic Times, Femina, and Outlook Business.

Best known for using natural product-derived active ingredients, its various products have been widely used in scientific research in the fields of pharmacology, phytochemistry, pharmacognosy, botany, chemistry, food technology, and food science, but have also received notable criticism from the media and academia for their advertising and labeling practices.

== History ==
=== 1998–2010 ===
In 1998, the Brihan Maharashtra Sugar Syndicate established a pharmaceuticals division in Mumbai to research and develop herbal medication using allopathic delivery systems and Ayurvedic formulae. In August 1999, the company conducted market analysis in Andhra Pradesh for skin care and hair care products with Ayurvedic formulae to address the side effects caused by cosmetic products, and then repeated the analysis on a national scale by February 2000. Brihans Natural Products was formally incorporated by Mandar Agashe on 20 April 2000 as a private limited company, and as a subsidiary of the syndicate.

By September 2001, the company was operating through a distribution network across India, exporting its products to the United Arab Emirates, Oman, Malaysia, and the Maldives. The company's initial products were a dandruff and hair loss prevention lotion and a chewable tablet for mouth ulcers. That same year, the company was awarded an Udyog Ratna Excellence Award from the Institute of Economic Studies, in New Delhi.

In December 2002, the company launched a shampoo and a skin gel, and further established a division to distribute to beauty parlours. In January 2003, the company announced plans to export to the United States and Europe, announcing a partnership with TSI Consumer Goods, to export Aloe vera juices and powders to be manufactured into personal care products for distribution within Europe from Germany. The company also exported to Sri Lanka, Mauritius, Thailand, and South Korea at that time. The company was reportedly the first Indian exporter of organic Aloe vera juice to Europe at the time.

By January 2004, the company was manufacturing several Aloe vera-based products and cucumber based products, and had introduced a hibiscus based hair gel. The company has also been a member as pharmaceutical formulations and herbal or neutraceutical products manufacturer of the Pharmaceuticals Export Promotion Council under the Ministry of Commerce and Industry of India since May 2004. By November of that same year, the company began exporting to Australia and South East Asia. By March 2006, the company had launched health juices, and further launched a turmeric based face wash in June that same year. As of 2007, the company was headquartered in Shaniwar Peth, Pune.

=== 2010–2020 ===
In January 2013, Sheetal Agashe was appointed the managing director of the company, having previously served as its chief executive officer since 2005. By May 2014, the company was exporting to Réunion and Singapore and manufactured most of its range with Aloe vera as the primary ingredient, having secured a trademark for its trade name in October 2013. In October 2016, the company's flagship brand was shortlisted as one of India's most trusted brands by the business analysis firm IBC InfoMedia.

In July 2017, the company sponsored Vikram Phadnis's directorial debut, Hrudayantar (2017), starring Mukta Barve and Subodh Bhave, with its products being placed in scenes throughout the film. In August of that year, the company's reported competitors were Patanjali Ayurved, Dabur, the Baidyanath Group, and the Himalaya Wellness Company. In September 2017, the company was also part of a shopper marketing trade show in Navi Mumbai hosted by the Maharashtra Industrial Development Corporation. In March 2018, the company was a brand sponsor for the Marathi edition of the Mirchi Music Awards. In September of that year, the company further sponsored Femina magazine's Mrs. Stylista beauty pageant. In December of that same year, the company was awarded an India's Most Admired Brand Award by the market research firm White Page India.

By April 2019, the company was sourcing locally produced raw material from drought-prone Solapur in Maharashtra, and its marketing strategy relied on celebrity endorsements, film and television product placements, and award show sponsorships. In May of that year, the company's reported market share of Aloe vera on the Indian subcontinent was significant. In May and June of that same year, Malaika Arora endorsed the company's products in sponsored columns in Times Life, followed by posts over social media that July. In August of that year, the company's flagship brand was once again shortlisted as one of that year's most trusted brands in India from IBC InfoMedia, and in December 2019, received a Promising Brand Award from The Economic Times, with the company further sponsoring the 6th Filmfare Glamour and Style Awards that same month.

=== 2020–present ===
In a July 2020 report prepared by the National Institute of Agricultural Marketing, the company's operations in the Indian Aloe vera market were cited as significant. In December 2020, amidst the COVID-19 pandemic, the company launched a 60% w/w alcohol based hand sanitizer and a liquid hand soap. By July 2021, the company was exporting its products across India, the United Arab Emirates, Singapore, Nepal, and Malaysia. In December of that year, the company was part of a shopper marketing trade show organised by the Rotary Club of Madgaon.

In January 2022, the company's flagship brand was the recipient of a Femina magazine's Power Brands Award, and was awarded a Movers and Shakers Award from Outlook in May 2022. The company itself was awarded a Best of Bharat Award from the Exchange4Media Group that same month. In August that same year, the company was a brand sponsor for the 67th Filmfare Awards. In 2023, the company further sponsored the Sakal Premier Awards in April, the Grazia Millennial Awards in June, the Bhojpuri Icon Awards by Filmfare and Femina in July, and the 2023 Filmfare OTT Awards in November. In March 2024, the company sponsored the inaugural Women Achievers Awards hosted by the police commissioner of the Pune Police.

In April 2025, the company celebrated its silver jubilee. In June that same year, the company was a sponsor for the Empower Her event held by Grihshobha magazine in Noida. In July, the company sponsored the 9th Filmfare Awards Marathi, and further sponsored the Filmfare OTT Awards 2025 in December. In August 2026, the company sponsored the 10th Filmfare Awards Marathi.

== Product history ==
The company has manufactured gels, moisturizers, shampoos, and ointments under its flagship brand Greenleaf since December 2002, and has been cited for using the balanced scorecard strategy in its business performance management. The products are typically manufactured with natural products such as Aloe vera, Curcuma longa, Melaleuca alternifolia, Cucumis sativus, Hibiscus rosa-sinensis, Prunus amygdalus, and Garcinia indica as active ingredients in their formulations. The products have generally been marketed for the summer season.

In January 2006, The Economic Times reported that the company manufactured standardized batches of Aloe barbadensis to prevent contamination in its products. The company has manufactured sugar free health juices containing Aloe vera and Phyllanthus emblica since March 2006. The juices are typically fibrous in consistency, and are marketed as nutritional supplements and immunity builders. Since 2016, Greenleaf (Note: The brand name was initially stylized as "Green Leaf", but has been stylized as "Greenleaf" as of 2022. Its 2019 trademark registration was for both stylizations. This article uses the latest style for consistency.) has also served as the umbrella brand for the company.

The company has manufactured a dandruff and hair loss prevention lotion since April 2000, before introducing a shampoo in December 2002, and then a hair serum containing Aloe vera, Hibiscus rosa-sinensis, Lawsonia inermis, Phyllanthus emblica, and Eclipta prostrata in November 2023. The company also manufactures a chewable tablet with Glycyrrhiza glabra and Acacia catechu for mouth ulcers, usually marketed as an over-the-counter herbal medicine.

== Use in research ==
The company's various products have also been used in scientific research, particularly in the fields of pharmacology, phytochemistry, pharmacognosy, botany, chemistry, food technology, and food science.

The company's Greenleaf Aloe Vera Gel was used as the research material in a July 2008 study published in the journal Phytotherapy Research conducted by Rishi et al, studying the anti-inflammatory property of Aloe vera on the inflammation caused by the Salmonella enterica subsp. enterica subspecies of the genus Salmonella OmpR when applied topically or administered by intraperitoneal injection, concluding that the superoxide dismutase present in Aloe vera mediated the inflammation by increasing macrophage levels.

The company's initial organic Aloe vera juice exports to Europe were cited in a December 2009 study published by the journal Beverage & Food World conducted by Singh et al from the food technology departments of the Allahabad Agricultural Institute and the National Productivity Council, researching the use of hurdle technology in determining the effects of pasteurisation or the use of preservatives as efficient preservation methods on the pH and total suspended solids in Aloe vera juice.

In a study published in Pharmacognosy Research in January 2010, Bhatia et al compared the company's Aloe vera gel against the UV-protective compounds found in Porphyra vietnamensis. Using erythemogenic effect values, they tested the absorbance values of the methanolic aliquots of the Aloe vera gel to calculate its sun protection factor against that of Porphyra. They concluded that the Aloe vera gel had lower absorption power over a broad UV wavelength as compared to the isolated compound of the Porphyra.

In a 2015 animal study conducted at the Dr. D. Y. Patil Medical College, Hospital & Research Centre, the company's commercial 90% w/w Aloe vera gel was evaluated alongside fresh plant alternatives to assess healing efficiency on partial-thickness burn wounds using Sprague-Dawley rats. The study concluded that while processed commercial formulations effectively supported tissue repair, fresh raw aloe pulp directly harvested from the plant leaf outperformed them, exhibiting the highest rate of wound contracture and a shorter re-epithelialisation timeline.

In a September 2023 study published by the Journal of Photochemistry and Photobiology in January 2024, Sahoo et al sought to study if N-acetylcysteine would photo-stabilize avobenzone under natural sunlight by integrating avobenzone, N-acetylcysteine (as a wound healing agent), and glutathione as a skin whitener into the company's Greenleaf Aloe Cucumber Gel using Ellman's reagent. Their findings concluded that their integrated formulation with the Greenleaf Aloe Cucumber Gel protected the skin against UVA radiation because the N-acetylcysteine deactivated the keto-avobenzone, and promoted keto-enol tautomerization.

== Controversies and criticism ==
In April 2014, the company's advertisement for its hair loss lotion brand CleanComb was complained against to the Consumer Complaints Council of the Advertising Standard Council of India. The complaints alleged that the advertisement misled customers in violation of the Drugs and Magic Remedies (Objectionable Advertisements) Act, 1954. The company's brand was one of several consumer brands from the health care and personal care products industries to be complained against.

In October 2017, the Consumer Complaints Council of the Advertising Standard Council of India further upheld consumer complaints suo moto against the company's advertisement of their flagship Greenleaf Pure Aloe Vera Skin Gel product in the personal care products category. The complaints alleged that the company's use of the "India's Most Trusted Brand Award 2016" from IBC InfoMedia was unreferenced within the advertisement, further alleging that the survey methodology, survey data, evaluation criteria, and competitor analysis for the award were missing from the advertisement.

The complaints further alleged that the product's claimed effects against acne, sunburn, rashes, skin allergies, cuts, and wounds were inadequately substantiated with comparative research for product efficacy, and thus misleading as per the Drugs and Magic Remedies Act, 1954, and the Drugs and Cosmetics Rules, 1945. As a result, the company conducted clinical trials in April 2018 for the product which allegedly proved that it reduced inflammation and improved healing of the skin.

The company's 2017 advertising flaws were cited in a February 2020 analysis published in the Asian Journal of Multidimensional Research by C. L. Avadhani at Annamalai University, studying the advertising laws and regulations of India that applied to the healthcare industry.

== See also ==
- Alternative medicine
- Ayurveda
- Cosmetics
- FMCG in India

== Bibliography ==
- Babu, M. Kishore; Prasad, G.; Sreenivas, T.; Sirisha, B. (2017). Globalisation of Indian Healthcare Services. Lucknow: Vandana Publications. ISBN 978-81-934822-8-5 – via Google Books.
- Company News and Notes. Vol. 37. Ministry of Commerce & Industry. July 2000. ISSN 0010-4027. LCCN sa64002695. OCLC 1564543 – via University of California, Berkeley.
- Jasti, Venkat, ed. (2008). Pharmexcil: Pharmaceuticals Export Promotion Council Members Directory (PDF). Hyderabad: Ministry of Commerce and Industry – via Google Scholar.
- Mody, Dinesh B., ed. (2005). Pharmexcil: Pharmaceuticals Export Promotion Council Members Directory. Hyderabad: Ministry of Commerce and Industry. Archived from the original on 31 March 2025 – via Scribd.
- Nair, Siddharth; K., Samir; Pahari, Aishi (2018). "Brihans Natural Products". In Sen, Anusua; Baweja, Garima; Zafar, S. (eds.). India's Most Admired Brands 2018-19 : Research by White Page (Coffee table book). Vol. VII. Research directed by Makky, M. Y. New Delhi: Pegasus Events & IQ Design Studio.
- Pullaiah, T. (2002). Medicinal Plants in India. Vol. 2. New Delhi: Regency Publications. ISBN 978-81-87498-51-3. OCLC 52472047 – via University of Chicago.
- Sathe-Patwardhan, Radhika (2019). "The Boss Lady: Sheetal Agashe, MD, Brihans Natural Products". In Chaitanya, Tanya (ed.). Femina presents Pune's Most Powerful 2018-19 (Coffee table book). Mumbai: Worldwide Media. RNI 6253/59.
- The Indian Newspaper Society Press Handbook. New Delhi: S. Bhushan Jain. 2007. OCLC 20611811 – via Google Books.

=== Academic articles ===
- Avadhani, C. L. (February 2020). Jain, Esha (ed.). "Healthcare advertisement (promotion) – ethical and legal issues - Applicability of Indian laws - An analysis" (PDF). Asian Journal of Multidimensional Research. 9 (2): 30–55. doi:10.5958/2278-4853.2020.00015.4. ISSN 2278-4853. S2CID 216334039 – via Google Scholar.
- Bhatia, Saurabh; Sharma, K.; Namdeo, Ajay G.; Chaugule, B. B.; Kavale, M.; Nanda, S. (January 2010). "Broad-spectrum sun-protective action of Porphyra-334 derived from Porphyra vietnamensis" (PDF). Pharmacognosy Research. 2 (1). Pune; Rohtak: Bharati Vidyapeeth; Pune University; Maharishi Dayanand University: 45–49. doi:10.4103/0974-8490.60578. ISSN 0976-4836. OCLC 820689945. PMC 3140129. PMID 21808539. S2CID 5433247. Archived from the original (PDF) on 7 July 2026 – via Semantic Scholar.
- Chauhan, Om Prakash; Raju, P. S.; Khanum, Farhat; Bawa, Amarinder Singh (2007). "Aloe vera : Therapeutic and food applications". Indian Food Industry. 26 (3). Mumbai: Association of Food Scientists and Technologists India: 43–51. ISSN 0972-2610. Archived from the original on 11 July 2026 – via Google Scholar.
- Gohel, Harshakumari J. (2007). Relevance of Balanced Scorecard for Performance Evaluation of Selected Indian Corporate Units (PDF) (Doctor of Philosophy thesis). Rajkot, Gujarat: Saurashtra University. Archived from the original (PDF) on 12 April 2019 – via CORE.
- Kaur, Gurdev (2025). "Misleading advertisement and consumer protection in India in comparison with USA and UK" (PDF). Indian Journal of Legal Review. 5 (8). Dehradun: Uttaranchal University; Institute of Legal Education: 677–685. ISSN 2583-2344. Archived from the original (PDF) on 7 July 2026 – via Google Scholar.
- Lakhanpal, Garima; Bhalerao, Seema; Sharma, Sagar; Patil, Harshal (2015). "To Study the Efficacy of Different Formulations of Aloe Vera (Spp. Aloe barbadensis) On Wound Healing in Rats" (PDF). Research Journal of Pharmaceutical, Biological and Chemical Sciences. 6 (4). Pune: Dr. D. Y. Patil Medical College, Hospital & Research Centre. ISSN 0975-8585. Archived from the original (PDF) on 28 July 2018 – via Google Scholar.
- Rishi, Praveen; Rampuria, Anjali; Tewari, Rupinder; Koul, Ashwani (29 July 2008). "Phytomodulatory potentials of Aloe vera against Salmonella OmpR-mediated inflammation". Phytotherapy Research. 22 (8). doi:10.1002/ptr.2458. ISSN 1099-1573. OCLC 264675210. PMID 18570273. S2CID 33776875. Archived from the original on 7 March 2025 – via John Wiley & Sons, Inc.
- Sahoo, Deepak Kumar; Jena, Subhrakant; Mohanty, Pranay; Biswal, Himansu S.; Gowd, Konkallu Hanumae (15 January 2024). "Probing the photostability of avobenzone with N-acetylcysteine using UV spectroscopy, computational studies and integration into aloe vera gel". Journal of Photochemistry and Photobiology. 447 (A: Chemistry) 115196. Bibcode:2024JPPA..44715196S. doi:10.1016/j.jphotochem.2023.115196. ISSN 1010-6030. OCLC 10062577715. S2CID 262988495. Archived from the original on 18 February 2024 – via Elsevier.
- Singh, Sattram; De, Dyuti (July 2020). To Study the Cultivation / Collection Practices and Market Analysis of Ashwagandha, Aloe-vera and Aonla in the State of Telangana (PDF) (Report). Jaipur: National Institute of Agricultural Marketing. Archived from the original (PDF) on 31 March 2025 – via Google Scholar.
- Singh, Shiv; Kumar, Anil; Shalini, Rachana (December 2009). "Effect of Preservation Techniques and Storage Conditions on TSS and pH of Flavoured Aloe Vera juice". Beverage & Food World. Bombay: Amalgamated Press. ISSN 0970-6194. OCLC 39134968. Archived from the original on 30 January 2025 – via ResearchGate.
- Yadav, Vibhu (2014). Technology development for the manufacture of Aloe vera supplemented probiotic ice cream (Doctor of Philosophy thesis). Karnal: National Dairy Research Institute. Archived from the original on 12 July 2026 – via Google Scholar.

=== Business reports ===
- Global (United States, China, Japan, Europe, MEA, LATAM, RoW) Aloe Vera Products Market Size, Growth Drivers and Trend to 2028 (Report). Edison, New Jersey: HTF Marketing Intelligence Consulting. May 2019. 1297914. Archived from the original on 22 August 2020.
- India Aloe Vera Products Market By End Use Application, By Form, By Distribution Channel, Competition Forecast & Opportunities, 2012 – 2022 (Report). TechSci Research. 17 August 2017. 5065468 – via ReportLinker.
- Suo Moto action against 148 advertisements: Healthcare: 82, Education: 75, Personal Care: 11, F&B: 8, Others: 24 (PDF) (Report). Mumbai: Advertising Standard Council of India. 28 December 2017. Archived from the original (PDF) on 22 September 2023.
