= Clinical trials in India =

Clinical trials in India refers to clinical research in India in which researchers test drugs and other treatments on research participants. NDCTR 2019 and section 3.7.1 to 3.7.3 of ICMR guidelines requires that all researchers conducting a clinical trial must publicly document it in the Clinical Trials Registry - India.

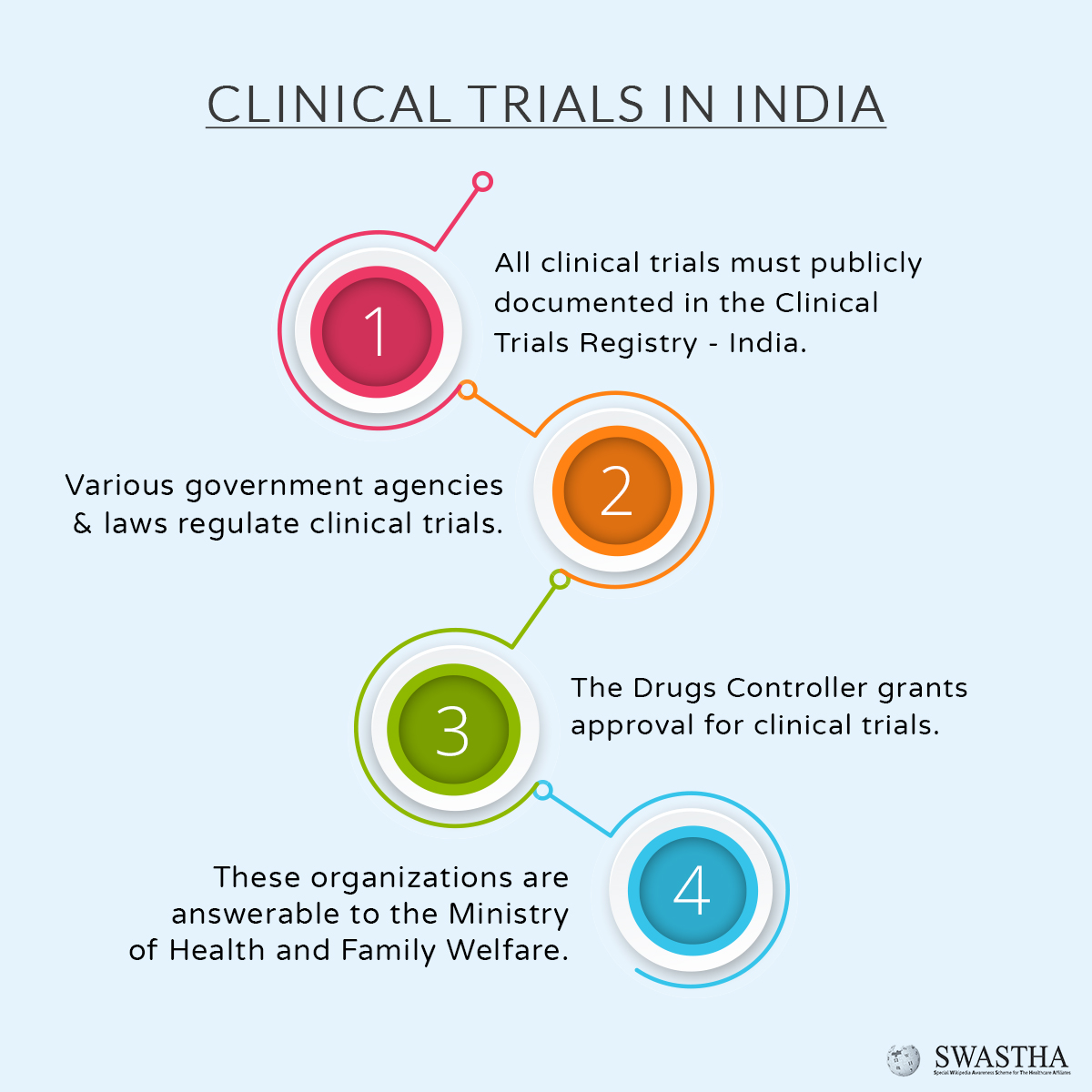
Flowchart of Clinical Trials in India

Various government agencies and laws regulate clinical trials. The Drugs Controller General of India grants approval for clinical trials and is the top level authority which specifically oversees clinical trials. The Drugs Controller is a part of the Central Drugs Standard Control Organisation and answers to that organization. Both of those organizations answer the Ministry of Health and Family Welfare as the highest level government agency overseeing everything related to medicine and health. The Indian Council of Medical Research governs the professional and ethical behavior of the doctors and scientists. The Pharmacovigilance Program of India tracks reports of harm from the use of drugs. Outside of the central government, each state has its own regional regulatory agencies with some input into governing trials.

Since the early 2000s there have been international discussions from science, medicine, and business sectors which observed that India is both an attractive and challenging place to conduct medical research. Favorable characteristics of India included that there are many trained workers including health professionals, there is a large and diverse population, and that the cost of research is relatively low in India in comparison to other countries capable of doing research. Challenging characteristics include lack of research capacity, evolving and uncertain government regulatory infrastructure, diversity of languages, and the need for a culture of research participant confidentiality.

In the years around 2010 there were various scandals in media and popular discussion in which companies conducted clinical trials in unethical ways. There were many discussions raising many complaints, including that researchers were not getting informed consent from research participants, and that the medical research was dismissing high rates of injury and death among research participants. Following the 2013 case Swasthya Adhikar Manch v. Union of India in the Supreme Court of India, various government agencies reformed their regulations to make clinical trials more ethical. There have been many changes with various responses. Among the responses, some say that the clinical trials are safer for participants, and others say that the new rules favor large domestic and international companies over other stakeholders.

== Government regulation ==
Since 2009 the Central Drugs Standard Control Organization has mandated that anyone conducting clinical research in India must preregister in the Clinical Trials Registry – India before enrolling any research participants.

Various government agencies and laws regulate clinical trials. The Drugs Controller General of India grants approval for clinical trials and is the top level authority which specifically oversees clinical trials. The Drugs Controller is a part of the Central Drugs Standard Control Organisation and answers to that organization. Both of those organizations answer the Ministry of Health and Family Welfare as the highest level government agency overseeing everything related to medicine and health. The Indian Council of Medical Research governs the professional and ethical behavior of the doctors and scientists. The Pharmacovigilance Program of India tracks reports of harm from the use of drugs.

Before 2005 India had a "phase lag" policy for clinical trials from foreign countries. In this policy, all clinical research in India had to begin at phase one. A 2005 change to liberalize the policy begin allowing companies to skip earlier phase trials to start with more risky trials in India, if there was prior research doing those earlier trials in another country.

Clinical trials have to be monitored by an ethics committee which registers with the government. A study examining all registered ethics committees in 2017 reported that few of them were in academic medical institutions, which is the global norm and desirable for such organizations.

Some legal commentators describe how the Constitution of India provides fundamental rights in India which apply to participants in clinical trials.

== Overview of trials ==
Various reports have discussed the number of clinical trials which the Indian government has approved per year. A theme of these reports is that the number of trials generally increases, and that changes in the rates of the number of trials approved corresponds with regulatory changes.

Count of clinical trial approvals
Year	Trials
2008	65
2009	391
2010	500
2011	262

The government approval process for clinical trials is sporadic. A 2013 report commented that in one day, the Indian government approved 50 trials after not having approved any in the past six months. The same report noted that the rate of government approval changes by year.

A single study examining a sample of academic papers which reported the results of dentistry-related clinical trials in 2011-12 found that the reporting was poor.

== Ethics ==
Various commentators have noted that there is a conflict between the opportunity for business investors to conduct research in India and the rights and safety of the volunteer research participants who participate in these clinical trials. Discussions of this issue often propose some kind of balance where researchers do trials, but not too many or too quickly, and that the trials collectively support ethical and safety practices which community stakeholders, academic researchers, doctors, and the government all create together.

Wealthy companies in countries with strong economies routinely seek to purchase clinical trial research in India as they seek comparable results at lower cost. As the wealthy country has the power of its money, and as typical participants in clinical trials are volunteers with no understanding of the money involved or power dynamics, many ethical issues arise.

A 2018 study on informed consent found that in a set of cancer-related trials, nearly all research participants had serious misconceptions about their research participation. A common misconception was an expectation of improved health care. The study recommended improved research participant education as a way to make the management of trials more ethical.

Government talks of permitting human challenge studies in India began in 2017. The Translational Health Science and Technology Institute expressed support for allowing these trials at that time.

One 2015 audit of 5 years of trials at a single site found that the expected percentage of people invited to participate declined to do so. That study said that this rate of refusal was an indication of an appropriate level of persuasiveness in study participant recruitment.

An evaluation of about 50 clinical trials in 2007-08 found that the reported results had higher than expected rates of false positive errors due to the statistical methods the researchers used.

== Comparison to other countries ==
India's clinical research is a subject of comparison with that of China, countries in Africa, and countries with similarly sized economies. India is both an attractive and challenging place for both Indian and foreign clinical research for various reasons.

A common motivation for foreign companies doing research in India is relatively lower cost in as compared to comparable research elsewhere. India was a single nation with a large, diverse population. Many potential research participants in India had not previously had medical treatment, and clinical trials get better data from such people. India also has a well trained workforce and many research sites which met international good clinical practice standards. India's national health system provides a lot of care in large urban hospitals. This centralization is also favorable to conducting research.

One challenge to doing research is a shortage of research sites which could conduct research and expand the sector. This shortage has various causes, including lack of educational programmes leading health professionals into research as a career track, the lack of experienced administrators who could expand study capacity, and a national research environment with either insufficient quality control processes.

When researchers conduct trials in multiple countries collecting patient-reported outcomes is useful. However, to make sense of any such reports from India, then researchers have to adapt the instructions for local Indian culture.

A 2011 evaluation found that a sample of clinical trials in India complied with the Consolidated Standards of Reporting Trials.

To make India more compliant with international standards the government amended the Drugs and Cosmetics Rules, 1945 in 2005 and 2008.

At the end of 2010 India was conducting 7% of phase III and 3% of phase II trials globally. In 2019 India was hosting about 1% of the world's clinical trials.

=== Social awareness ===
There was perception in the research community that the media had usefully brought public scrutiny of the ethics and conduct of clinical trials. While researchers and investors wanted trials, they also wanted a reliable research environment which the public and media could trust. Various changes in government regulation sought to make trials safer for research participants and investment in trials. The response to having changes in general was positive, although there was intense debate from stakeholders on the individual changes. The criticism tended to argue that the changes were too strict.

There was criticism that medical journals in India were publishing the results of trials without requiring that the articles describe compliance with regulatory standards including Consolidated Standards of Reporting Trials.

=== Injury ===
In 2013 the Supreme Court of India ordered the Ministry of Health and Family Welfare to police and prevent multinational companies from conducting illegal clinical trials in India.

There is public information reporting how many people die during clinical trials. It is also known that when people die during trials in India, the trial organization rarely pays compensation to the family of the deceased.

The research industry has formulas for calculating how much money to pay when someone dies in a clinical trial.

=== Foreign influence ===
A 2011 paper noted that low operational costs, improved government regulation, and existing business infrastructure have made India increasingly attractive as a place for foreign companies to conduct clinical trials.

Some clinical trials based in the United States also do research in India. A 2019 examination of 10 years of United States children's health research found that of about 9000 trials registered about 120 of them also included clinical trials in India. This study found that these trials were for health issues which actually affect children in India, and that consequently, the research was appropriate for India.

Some researchers study global practices for managing clinical trials and apply lessons learned to multiple countries at once, with India being among them.

When foreign companies conduct only phase III trials in India, the researchers conducting those trials tend to not publish as many scientific insights as researchers typically do in other circumstances. There is a foreign expectation that perhaps because India has relatively less regulation than foreign countries which export clinical research, then perhaps the researchers in India would have more insights. The reasons for this are not clear, but one reason may be that researchers who oversee the trial for longer periods and not just the last phase tend to care more about publishing research results.

When financial investment is the priority then foreign sponsored research tends to focus on the health concerns of the host country rather than the health needs of India. A characteristic of a healthy clinical trials sector in a country is prioritizing the most urgent health concerns of the population. Some researchers advocate for reflection on India's research priorities.

A review of clinical trials from 2006 to 2013 foundation that when India hosted clinical research for either the United States or European Union, and when research in India led to the availability of a new drug in those places, then in 40% of cases India did not also get domestic approval to use that drug. This low rate of domestic drug approval demonstrates that the research is not actually a medical benefit to the local population in India. More frequent drug approvals for drugs tested in India and approved elsewhere would be a public benefit.

=== Business ===
Various reports describe the global industry of outsourcing clinical research from one country to another, and present India as one of the lower cost countries for conducting trials.

A 2007 paper reported that in the past few years the annual revenue of the clinical trials industry had grown 25% annually.

Companies conducting clinical trials in India often do so through a contract research organization. Since the 2000s there has been recognition that India is an attractive place to grow an industry of drug research.

A 2008 report described the entry of multinational companies into India for clinical trials research as a frenzy. At the time there was a perception that the industry was going to grow fast for the foreseeable future in a way that favored the research investor. Most investors wished into enter India through contract research organizations.

Foreign investment in India has resulted in a concentration of international research centers in India. Larger research companies are growing faster than small ones, and larger ones are capturing the influence to propose government regulations more quickly than other stakeholder groups. The investment from foreign companies has resulted in more education, professional training, and jobs in the clinical research sector. However, there has been an obvious sudden increase of influence by both foreign and domestic large companies as this research field has developed.

The establishment of the Pharmacovigilance Program made India a more attractive international destination for foreign companies to bring clinical trials research.

== History ==
Until 1995 the United States, Europe, and Japan conducted most clinical trials. The first evaluation of good clinical practices for research in India was done in 1995. A 2004 paper advised that India lacked the research environment which most clinical researchers require. Because of the risks, that paper advised that foreign countries would not gain benefit from outsourcing clinical trials to India.

=== 2005 to 2013 ===
India agreed to comply with the TRIPS Agreement in 2005. The agreement changed the way India recognizes intellectual property and changed the research environment in way that enabled foreign companies to conduct clinical trials in India. Foreign contract research organizations were able to conduct clinical trials in India from this point.

An estimate in 2007 predicted that India would be conducting about 20% of the world's clinical trials by 2010. Further speculation of the time was that India would be the preferred global destination for many sorts of clinical trials. Among all that growth, a major concern was establishing regulation to improve the ethics and integrity of clinical research in India. The Indian Council of Medical Research established the Clinical Trials Registry - India in July 2007 with the intent to improve India's clinical trials research environment.

In 2008 a representative for the Indian Council of Medical Research remarked that increased government regulation would be necessary to ensure research integrity and public safety in clinical trials. In 2008 a group of Indian medical journals made a pledge that from 2010 onward, they would only publish research on clinical trials if that trial was appropriately registered. Prior to this, there were essays considering whether the time was right to do this.

In 2009 there was a significant expansion in clinical trials done in India. Beginning in 2013 there were many regulatory changes which had the effect of reducing the number of clinical trials while also drawing attention to ethical challenges of clinical research in India.

In May 2012 the 59th report of the Indian Parliamentary Standing Committee on Health and Family Welfare issued a report criticized the Central Drugs Standard Control Organization. The report complained that the organization was underfunded and understaffed. Because of lack of staff, the organization would never be able to perform its duties. The staff who were there were working under a misguided mandate to "meet the aspirations … demands and requirements of the pharmaceutical industry", which was an error and a conflict of interest against protecting the health of the public. Another problem that the report identified was that although India requires drug companies to conduct at least phase III trials in India if other countries have already approved the drug, for some undocumented reason, the Drugs Controller was granting approvals without this research. Also, in 3 cases, drugs which neither had approval in other countries nor trials in India got approval for undocumented reasons.

=== 2013 to 2019 ===
By 2013 the problems with clinical trials had become troublesome to the point of media and public attention. When the media criticized trials, those reports tended to say that the researchers were exploiting the research participants by treating them as experimental guinea pigs. The media attention and public discussion resulted in researchers conducting fewer trails. The number of trials went from 529 in 2010, to about 250 in 2012, to about 100 in 2013.

The response to this was that various government agencies organized regulatory changes to resolve many problems at once. Researchers reflected on the causes of the problems, and the necessary changes to prevent future problems, and the regulatory reform which would support the changes in science and industry.

One change was that the government named a list of responsibilities and divided among the ethics committee, the investigator, and the sponsor. This way, each of those agents in a clinical trial take responsibility for their parts. From this point the researchers must register all clinical trials into the Clinical Trials Registry - India. Another change was that ethics committees associated with clinical trials had to themselves register with the Drugs Controller General of India. The informed consent process had to include all information both in the text document and a verbal description. No principal investigator can oversee more than three trials at once. Anyone funding a principal investigator has to disclose to the government how much they are paying. The government regulator set up audit process for ethics committees. The researchers must report serious adverse events quickly to the study sponsor, the ethics committee, and the government regulator. All trials will comply with publicly available payment formulas for calculating how much money to give in case of someone dying or experiencing any other serious adverse effect.

In the informed consent process there was consensus for addressing some communication issues. One was explaining that the control group in a placebo-controlled study will get no treatment. Another was explaining that the drug candidate is experimental, and not necessarily an effective therapy. There was also recognition that many administrative, procedural, and reporting functions needed national standardization.

In 2018 the government established a process for approving drugs in India, without clinical trials, in exceptional circumstances such as an epidemic.

=== 2019—present ===
In 2019 the government enacted the New drugs and clinical trials rules 2019. These rules provided more guidance for how the ethics committee of a clinical trial should oversee it. Critics of the rules said that the government compromised public safety in favor of industry and financial interests.

== Special populations ==
When Indian people consider volunteering for clinical trials they frequently have the same reasons for either joining or declining. Motivations for joining include intent to gain health benefit, altruism, in respect of the request of their physician, to get money for participating, and to get an opportunity to learn more about health and research. Reasons for not wanting to participate in a trial include mistrust of the organizations managing the research, fear of trial risks, stress, the obligation of participating, fear that the trial will not respect their personal information, creating a burden on their friends and families to support them in the trial, and the lack of available information about the research in their own local language.

People with schizophrenia require specific cultural support to participate in clinical trials.

A 2009 report described how innovation in phase 1 cancer research trials could have a big impact on Indian health.

Various studies in the United Kingdom have described how British researchers can make trial participation easier for South Asian people living in the UK.

A 2011 report encouraged teaching clinical research in the curriculum of medical students to prepare them to conduct trials.

A 2019 survey found that respondents in India were cautious in saying that they would approve of clinical trials related to the sexual health of adolescent girls.

== See also ==
- Clinical trials on Ayurveda
- Healthcare in India
- Health in India

== Further consideration ==
- Indian Council of Medical Research (2017). "National Ethical Guidelines for Biomedical and Health Research involving Human Participants" (PDF). Indian Council of Medical Research.
- "Extraordinary" (PDF), The Gazette of India (in Hindi and English), New Delhi: Ministry of Housing and Urban Affairs, 19 March 2019
