= Schedule H =

Class of prescription drugs in India

Schedule H is a class of prescription drugs in India appearing as an appendix to the Drugs and Cosmetics Rules, 1945 introduced in 1945. These are drugs which cannot be purchased over the counter without the prescription of a qualified doctor. The manufacture and sales of all drugs are covered under the Drugs and Cosmetics Act and Rules. It is revised at times based on the advice of the Drugs Technical Advisory Board, part of the Central Drugs Standard Control Organization in the Ministry of Health and Family Welfare. The most recent schedule H (2006) lists 536 drugs from abacavir to zuclopenthixol.

However, enforcement of Schedule H laws in India is lax, compared to the more restrictive Schedule X, for which a mandatory documentation trail must be maintained.

== List ==
List of Schedule H drugs in India according to Drug and Cosmetics Act ( Amendment) Rules. Published on 2020.

1. ABACAVIR
2. ABCIXIMAB
3. ACAMPROSATE CALCIUM
4. ACEBUTOL HYDROCHLORIDE
5. ACLARUBICIN
6. ALBENDAZOLE
7. ALCLOMETASONE DIPROPIONATE
8. ACTILYSE
9. ACYCLOVIR
10. ADENOSINE
11. ADRENOCORTICOTROPHIC HORMONE (ACTH)
12. ALENDRONATE SODIUM
13. ALLOPURINOL
14. ALPHACHYMOTRYPSIN
16. ALPROSTADIL
17. AMANTADINE HYDROCHLORIDE
18. AMIFOSTINE
19. AMIKACIN SULPHATE
20. AMILORIDE HYDROCHLORIDE
21. AMINEPTINE
22. AMINOGLUTETHIMIDE
23. AMINOSALICYLIC ACID
24. AMIODARONE HYDROCHLORIDE
25. AMITRIPTYLINE
26. AMLODIPINE BESYLATE
27. AMOSCANATE
28. AMOXOPINE
29. AMRINONE LACTATE
30. ANALGIN
31. ANDROGENIC ANABOLIC, OESTROGENIC & PROGESTATIONAL SUBSTANCES
32. ANTIBIOTICS
33. APRACLONIDINE
34. APROTININ
35. ORGANIC COMPOUND OF ARSENIC
36. ARTEETHER
37. ARTEMETHER
38. ARTESUNATE
39. ARTICAINE HYDROCHLORIDE
40. ATENOLOL
41. ATRACURIUM BESYLATE INJECTION
42. ATORVASTATIN CALCIUM
43. AURANOFIN
44. AZATHIOPRINE
45. AZTREONAM
46. BACAMPICILLIN
47. BACLOFEN
48. BALSALAZIDE
49. BAMBUTEROL
50. BARBITURIC ACID
51. BASILIXIMAB
52. BENAZEPRIL HYDROCHLORIDE
53. BENIDIPINE HYDROCHLORIDE
54. BENSERAZIDE HYDROCHLORIDE
55. BETAHISTINE DIHYDROCHLORIDE
56. BETHANIDINE SULPHATE
57. BEZAFIBRATE
58. BICALUTAMIDE
59. BICLOTYMOL
60. BIFONAZOLE
61. BIMATOPROST
62. BIPERIDEN HYDROCHLORIDE
63. BIPHENYL ACETIC ACID
64. BITOSCANATE
65. BLEOMYCIN
66. PRIMONIDINE TARTRATE
67. BROMHEXINE HYDROCLORIDE
68. BROMOCRIPTINE MESYLATE
69. BUDESONIDE
70. BULAQUINE
71. BUPIVA CAINE HYDROCHLORIDE
72. BUPROPION
73. BUSPIRONE
74. BUTENAFINE HYDROCHLORIDE
75. BUTORPHANOL TARTRATE
76. CABERGOLINE
77. CALCIUM DOBESILATE
78. CANDESARTAN
79. CAPECITABINE
80. CAPTOPRIL
81. CARBIDOPA
82. CARBOCISTEINE
83. CARBOPLATIN
84. CARBOQUONE
85. CARISOPRODOL
86. L-CARNITINE
87. CARTEOLOL HYDROCHLORIDE
88. CARVEDILOL
89. CEFADROXYL
90. CEFATOXIME SODIUM
91. CEFAZOLIN SODIUM
92. CEFDINIR
93. CEFEPIME HYDROCHLORIDE
94. CEFETAMET PIVOXIL
95. CEFPIROME
96. CEFPODOXIME POXETIL
97. CEFTAZIDIME PENTAHYDRATE
98. CEFTIZOXIME SODIUM
99. CEFUROXIME
100. CELECOXIB
101. CENTCHROMAN
102. CENTBUTINDOLE
103. CENTPROPAZINE
104. CETIRIZINE HYDROCHLORIDE
105. CHLORDIAZEPOXIDE
106. CHLORMEZANONE
107. Omitted vide GSR 790 (E) dated
29.10.2009
108. CHLORPROMAZINE
109. CHLORZOXAZONE
110. CICLOPIROX OLAMINE
111. CIMETIDINE
112. CINNARIZINE
113. CIPROFLOXACIN
HYDROCHLORIDE MONOHYDRATE / LACTATE
114. CISPLATIN
115. CITALOPRAM HYDROBROMIDE
116. CLARITHROMYCIN
117. CLAVULANIC ACID
118. CLIDINIUM BROMIDE
119. CLINDAMYCIN
120. CLOBAZAM
121. CLOBETASOL PROPENATE
122. CLOBETASONE 17-BUTYRATE
123. CLOFAZIMINE
124. CLOFIBRATE
125. CLONAZEPAM
126. CLONIDINE HYDROCHLORIDE
127. CLOPAMIDE
128. CLOPIDOGREL BISULPHATE
129. CLOSTEBOL ACETATE
130. CLOTRIMAZOLE
131. CLOZAPINE
132. CODEINE
133. COLCHICINE
134. CORTICOSTEROIDS
135. COTRIMOXAZOLE
136. CYCLANDELATE
137. CYCLOSPORINS
138. DACLIZUMAB
139. DANAZOLE
140. DAPSONE
141. DESLORATADINE
142. DESMOPRESSIN
142. DESOGESTROL
143. DEXRAZOXANE
144. DEXTRANOMER
145. Omitted vide GSR 790 (E) dated
29.10.2009
146. DEXTROPROPOXYPHENE
147. DIAZAPAM
148. DIAZOXIDE
149. DICLOFENAC SODIUM/POTASSIUM/ACID
150. DICYCLOMIN HYDROCHLORIDE
151. DIDANOSINE
152. DIGOXINE
153. DILAZEP HYDROCHLORIDE
154. DILTIAZEM
155. DINOPROSTONE
156. DIPHENOXYLATE, ITS SALTS
157. DIPIVEFRIN HYDROCHLORIDE
158. DI-SODIUM PAMIDRONATE
159. DISOPYRAMIDE
160. DOCETAXEL
161. DOMPERIDONE
162. DONEPEZIL HYDROCHLORIDE
163. DOPAMINE HYDROCHLORIDE
164. DOTHIEPIN HYDROCHLORIDE
165. DOXAPRAM HYDROCHLORIDE
166. DOXAZOSIN MESYLATE
167. DOXEPIN HYDROCHLORIDE
168. DOXORUBICIN HYDROCHLORIDE
169. DROTRECOGIN-ALPHA
170. EBASTINE
171. ECONOZOLE
172. EFAVIRENZ
173. ENALAPRIL MELEATE
174. ENFENAMIC ACID
175. EPINEPHRINE
176. EPIRUBICINE
177. EPTIFIBATIDE
178. ERGOT, ALKALOIDS OF WHETHER HYDROGENATED OR NOT, THEIR HOMOLOGOUES, SALTS
179. ESOMEPRAZOLE
180. ESTRADIOL SUCCINATE
181. ESTRAMUSTINE PHOSPHATE
182. ETANERCEPT
183. ETHACRIDINE LACTATE
184. ETHAMBUTOL HYDROCHLORIDE
185. ETHAMSYLATE
186. ETHINYLOESTRADIOL
187. ETHIONAMIDE
188. ETIDRONATE DISODIUM
189. ETODOLAC
190. ETOMIDATE
191. ETOPOSIDE
192. EXEMESTANE
193. FAMCICLOVIR
194. FAMOTIDINE
195. FENBENDAZOLE
196. FENOFIBRATE
197. FEXOFENADINE
198. FINASTERIDE
199. FLAVOXATE HYDROCHLORIDE
200. 5-FLUOROURACIL
201. FLUDARABINE
202. FLUFENAMIC ACIDS
203. FLUNARIZINE HDROCHLORIDE
204. FLUOXETINE HYDROCHLORIDE
205. FLUPENTHIXOL
206. FLUPHENAZINE ENANTHATE
AND DECANOATE
207. FLURAZEPAM
208. FLURBIPROFEN
209. FLUTAMIDE
210. FLUTICASONE PROPIONATE
211. FLUVOXAMINE MALEATE
212. FORMESTANE
213. FOSFESTRIL SODIUM
214. FOSINOPRIL SODIUM
215. FOSSPHENYTOIN SODIUM
216. FOTEMUSTINE
217. GABAPENTIN
218. GALANTHAMINE HYDROBROMIDE
219. GALLAMINE, ITS SALTS, ITS QUATERNARY COMPOUND
220. GANCYCLOVIR
221. GANIRELIX
222. GATIFLOXACIN
223. GEMCITABINE
224. GEMFIBROZIL
225. GEMTUZUMAB
226. GENODEOXYCHOLIC ACID
227. GLICLAZIDE
228. GLIMEPIRIDE
229. GLUCAGON
230. GLYCOPYRROLATE
231. GLYDIAZINAMIDE
232. GOSERELIN ACETATE
233. GRANISETRON
234. GUANETHIDINE
235. GUGULIPID
236. HALOGENATED HYDROXYQUINOLINES
237. HALOPERIDOL
238. HEPARIN
239. HEPATITIS B. VACCINE
240. HYALURONIDASE
241. HYDROCORISONE 17-BUTYRATE
242. HYDROTALCITE
243. HYDROXIZINE
244. IBUPROFEN
245. IDEBENONE
246. IINDAPAMIDE
247. IMIPRAMINE
248. INDINAVIR SULPHATE
249. INDOMETHACIN
250. INSULIN HUMAN
251. INTERFERON
252. INTRAVENOUS FAT EMULSION
253. IOBITRIDOL
254. IOHEXOL
255. IOPAMIDOL
256. IOMEPROL
257. IOPROMIDE
258. IRBESARTAN
259. IRINOTECAN HYDROCHLORIDE
260. IRON PREPARATION FOR PARENTERAL USE
261. ISEPAMICINE
262. ISOCARBOXSIDE
263. ISOFLURANE
264. ISONICOTNIC ACID HYDRAZINE AND OTHER-HYDRAGINE DERIVATIVES OF ISONICOTINIC ACID
265. ISOSORBIDE DINITRATE/MONONITRATE
266. ISOTRETINOIN
267. ISOXSUPRINE
268. ITOPRIDE
269. KETAMINE HYDROCHLORIDE
270. KETOCONAZOLE
271. KETOPROFEN
272. KETOROLAC TROMETHAMINE
273. LABETALOL HYDROCHLORIDE
274. LACIDIPINE
275. LAMIVUDINE
276. LAMOTRIGINE
277. LATANOPROST
278. LEFUNOMIDE
279. LERCANIDIPINE HYDROCHLORIDE
280. LETROZOLE
281. LEUPROLIDE ACETATE
282. LEVAMESOLE
283. LEVARTERENOL
284. LEVOBUNOLOL
285. LEVOCETIRIZINE
286. LEVODOPA
287. LEVOFLOXACIN
288. LEVOVIST
289. LIDOFLAZINE
290. LINEZOLID
291. LITHIUM CARBONATE
292. LOFEPRAMINE DECANOATE
293. LOPERAMIDE
294. LORAZEPAM
295. LOSARTAN POTASSIUM
296. LOTEPREDNOL
297. LOVASTATIN
298. LOXAPINE
299. MEBENDAZOLE
300. MEBEVERINE HYDROCHLORIDE
301. MEDROXY PROGESTERONE ACETATE
302. MEFENAMIC ACID
303. MEFLOQUINE HYDROCHLORIDE
304. MEGESTROL ACETATE
305. MEGLUMINE IOCARMATE
306. MELAGENINA
307. MELITRACEN HYDROCHLORIDE
308. MELOXICAM
309. MEPHENESIN, ITS ESTERS
310. MEPHENTERMINE
311. MEROPENAM
312. MESTEROLONE
313. METAXALONE
314. METHICILLIN SODIUM
315. METHOCARBAMOL
316. METHOTRAXATE
317. METOCLOPRAMIDE
318. METOPROLOL TARTRATE
319. METRIZAMIDE
320. METRONIDAZOLE
321. MEXILETINE HYDROCHLORIDE
322. MIANSERIN HYDROCHLORIDE
323. MICONAZOLE
324. MIDAZOLAM
325. MIFEPRISTONE
326. MILRINONE LACTATE
327. MILTEFOSINE
328. MINOCYCLINE
329. MINOXIDIL
330. MIRTAZAPINE
331. MISOPROSTOL
332. MITOXANTRONE HYDROCHLORIDE
333. MIZOLASTINE
334. MOCLOBEMIDE
335. MOMETASONE FUROATE
336. MONTELUKAST SODIUM
337. MORPHAZINAMIDE HYDROCHLORIDE
338. MOSAPRIDE
339. MOXIFLOXACIN
340. MYCOPHENOLATE MOFETIL
341. NADIFLOXACIN
342. NADOLOL
343. NAFARELIN ACETATE
344. NALIDIXIC ACID
345. NAPROXEN
346. Narcotic Drugs and Psychotropic Substances Act, 1985
347. NATAMYCIN
348. NATEGLINIDE
349. N-BUTYL-2-CYANOACRYLATE
350. NEBIVOLOL
351. NEBUMETONE
352. NELFINAVIR MESILATE
353. NETILMICIN SULPHATE
354. NEVIRAPINE
355. NICERGOLINE
356. NICORANDIL
357. NIFEDIPINE
358. NIMESULIDE
359. NIMUSTINE HYDROCHLORIDE
360. NITRAZEPAM
361. NITROGLYCERIN
362. NORETH ISTERONE ENANTHATE
363. NORFLOXACIN
364. OCTYLONIUM BROMIDE
365. OFLOXACIN
366. OLANZAPINE
367. OMEPRAZOLE
368. ORNIDAZOLE
369. ORPHENADRINE
370. ORTHOCLONE STERILE
371. OXAZEPAM
372. OXAZOLIDINE
373. OXCARBAZEPINE
374. OXETHAZAINE HYDROCHLORIDE
375. OXICONAZOLE
376. OXOLINIC ACID
377. OXPRENOLOL HYDROCHLORIDE
378. OXYBUTYNIN CHLORIDE
379. OXYFEDRINE
380. OXYMETAZOLINE
381. OXYPHENBUTAZONE
382. OXYTOCIN
383. OZOTHINE
384. PACLITAXEL
385. PANCURONIUM BROMIDE
386. PANTOPRAZOLE
387. PARA-AMINO BENZENE SULPHONAMIDE, ITS SALTS & DERIVATIVES
388. PARP-AMINO SALICYLIC ACID, ITS SALTS, ITS DERIVATIVES
389. PARECOXIB
390. PAROXETINE HYDROCHLORIDE
391. D-PENICILLAMINE
392. PENTAZOCINE
393. PENTOXIFYLLINE
394. PEPLEOMYCIN
395. PHENELZINEH SULPHATE
396. PHENOBARBITAL
397. PHENOTHIAZINE, DERIVATIVES OF AND SALTS OF ITS DERIVATIVES
398. PHENYLBUTAZINE
399. PIMOZIDE
400. PINDOLOL
401. PIOGLITAZONE HYDROCHLORIDE
402. PIRACETAM
403. PIROXICAM
404. PITUITORY GLAND, ACTIVE PRINCIPLES OF, NOT OTHERWISE SPECIFIED IN THIS SCHEDULE AND THEIR SALTS
405. POLIDOCANOL
406. POLYESTRADIOL PHOSPHATE
407. PORACTANT ALFA
408. PRAZIQUANTEL
409. PREDNIMUSTINE
410. PREDNISOLONE STEAROYLGLYCOLATE
411. PRENOXDIAZIN HYDROCHLORIDE
412. PROMAZINE HYDROCHLORIDE
413. PROMEGESTONE
414. PROPAFENON HYDROCHLORIDE
415. PROPANOLOL HYDROCHLORIDE
416. PROPOFOL
417. PROTRISTYLINE HYDROCHLORIDE
418. PYRAZINAMIDE
419. PYRVINIUM
420. QUETIAPINE FUMERATE
421. QUINAPRIL
422. QUINIDINE SULPHATE
423. RABEPRAZOLE
424. RACECADOTRIL
425. RALOXIFENE HYDROCHLORIDE
426. RAMIPRIL HYDROCHLORIDE
427. RANITIDINE
428. RAUWOLFIA, ALKALOIDS OF, THEIR SALTS, DERIVATIVES OF THE ALKALOIDS OR RAUWOLFIA
429. REBOXETINE
430. REPAGLINIDE
431. REPROTEROL HYDROCHLORIDE
432. RILMENIDINE
433. RILUZONE
434. RISPERIDONE
435. RITONAVIR
436. RITODRINE HYDROCHLORIDE
437. RITUXIMAB
438. RIVASTIGMINE
439. ROCURONIUM BROMIDE
440. ROPINIROLE
441. ROSOXACIN
442. ROSIGLITAZONE MELEATE
443. SALBUTAMOL SULPHATE
444. SALICYL-AZO-SULPHAPYRIDINE
445. SALMON CALCITONIN
446. SAQUINAVIR
447. SATRANIDAZOLE
448. SECNIDAZOLE
449. SEPTOPAL BEADS & CHAINS
450. SERRATIOPEPTIDASE
451. SERTRALINE HYDROCHLORIDE
452. SIBUTRAMINE HYDROCHLORIDE
453. SILDENAFIL CITRATE
454. SIMVASTATIN
455. SIROLIMUS
456. SISOMICIN SULPHATE
457. S-NEOMINOPHAGEN
458. SODIUM PICOSULPHATE
459. SODIUM CROMOGLYCATE
460. SODIUM HYALURONATE
461. SODIUM VALPROATE
462. SODIUM AND MAGLUMINE IOTHALAMATES
463. SOMATOSTATIN
464. SOMATOTROPIN
465. SOTALOL
466. SPARFLOXACIN
467. SPECTINOMYCIN HYDROCHLORIDE
468. SPIRONOLACTONE
469. STAVUDINE
470. SUCRALFATE
471. SULPHADOXINE
472. SULPHAMETHOXINE
473. SULPHAMETHOXYPYRIDAZINE
474. SULPHAPHENAZOLE
475. SULPIRIDE
476. SULPROSTONE HYDROCHLORIDE
477. SUMATRIPTAN
478. TACRINE HYDROCHLORIDE
479. TAMSULOSIN HYDROCHLORIDE
480. TRAPIDIL
481. TEGASEROD MALEATE
482. TEICOPLANIN
483. TELMISARTAN
484. TEMOZOLAMIDE
485. TERAZOSIN
486. TERBUTALINE SULPHATE
487. TERFENADINE
488. TERIZIDONE
489. TERLIPRESSIN
490. TESTOSTERONE UNDECOANOATE
491. TERATOLOL HYDROCHLORIDE
492. THALIDOMIDE
493. THIACETAZONE
494. THIOCOLCHICOSIDE
495. THIOPROPAZATE, ITS SALTS
496. THYMOGENE
497. THYMOSIN-ALPHA 1
498. TIAPROFENIC ACID
499. TIBOLONE
500. TIMOLOL MALEATE
501. TINIDAZOLE
502. TIZANIDINE
503. TABRAMYCIN
504. TOLFENAMIC ACID
505. TOPIRAMATE
506. TOPOTECAN HYDROCHLORIDE
507. TRAMADOL HYDROCHLORIDE
508. TRANEXAMIC ACID
509. TRANYLCYPROMINE, ITS SALTS
510. TRAZODONE
511. TRETINOIN
512. TRIFLUPERAZINE
513. TRIFLUPERIDOL HYDROCHLORIDE
514. TRIFLUSAL
515. TRIMETAZIDINE DIHYDROCHLORIDE
516. TRIMIPRAMINE
517. TRIPOTASSIUM DICITRATE BISMUTHATE
518. TROMANTADINE HYDROCHLORIDE
519. UROKINASE
520. VALSARTAN
521. VASOPRESSIN
522. VECURONIUM BROMIDE
523. VENLAFAXINE HYDROCHLORIDE
524. VERAPAMIL HYDROCHLORIDE
525. VERTEPORFIN
526. VINCRISTINE SULPHATE
527. VINBLASTINE SULPHATE
528. VINDESINE SULPHATE
529. VINORELBINE TATRATE
530. XIPAMIDE
531. ZIDOVUDINE HYDROCHLORIDE
532. ZIPRASIDONE HYDROCHLORIDE
533. ZOLEDRONIC ACID
534. ZOLPIDEM
535. ZOPICLONE
536. ZUCLOPENTHIXOL
537. Etizolam
538. Alclometasone
539. Beclomethasone
540. Betamethasone
541. Desonide
542. Desoximetasone
543. Dexamethasone
544. Diflorasone diacetate
545. Fluocinonide
546. Fluocinolone acetonide
547. Halobetasol propionate
548. Halometasone
549. Methyl prednisone
550. Prednicarbate
551. Triamcinolone acetonide
552. Stanozolol.
