= Sheetal Agashe =

Indian businesswoman and actress (born 1977)

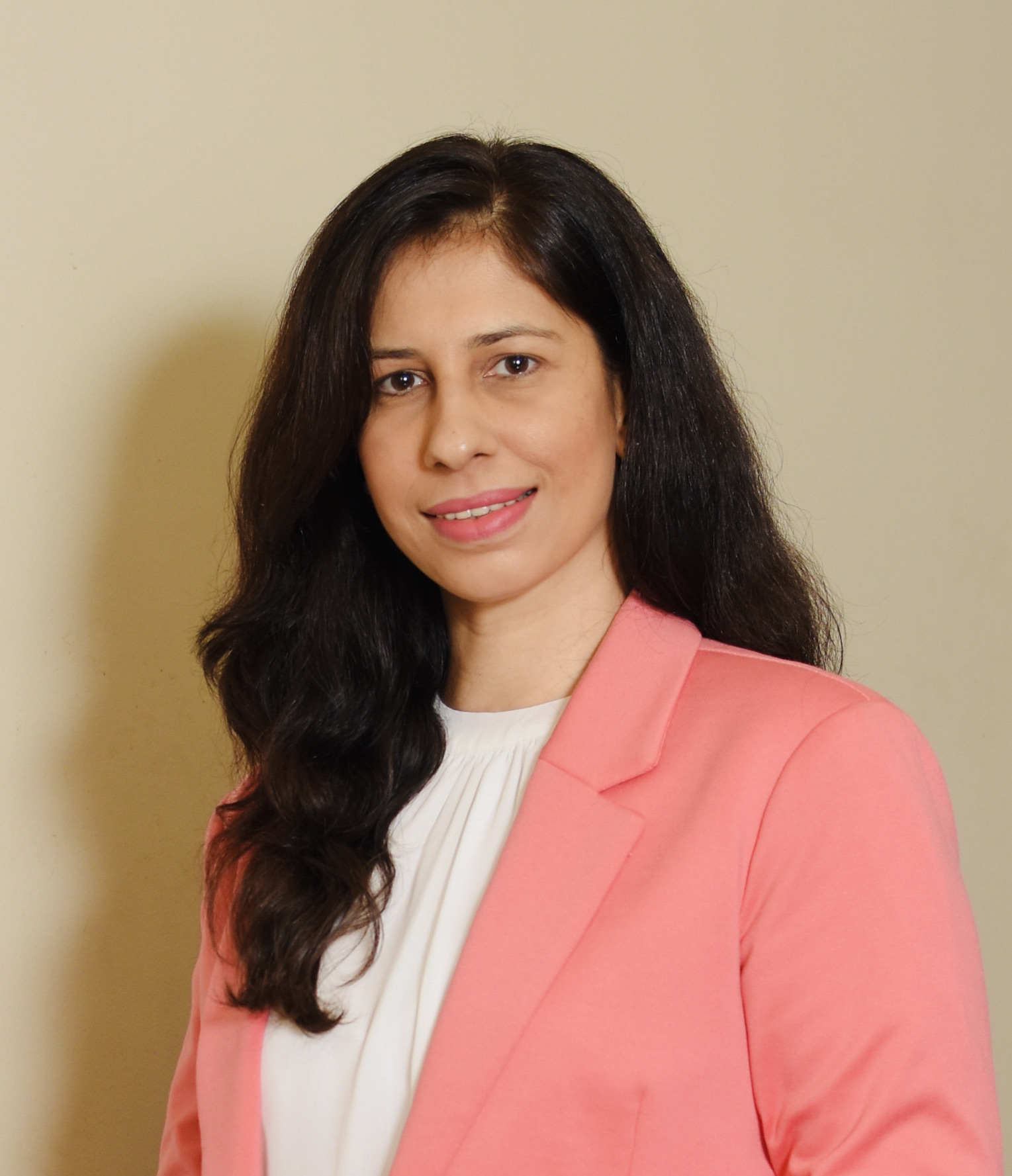
- Official portrait, 2021

Managing director of Brihans Natural Products
- In office 11 January 2013 – Incumbent

Personal details
- Born: 17 May 1977 (age 49) Pune, Maharashtra, India
- Parents: Dnyaneshwar Agashe (father); Rekha Gogte (mother)
- Education: Brihan Maharashtra College of Commerce (B.Com); University of Pune (MBA)
- Occupation: Businesswoman; film and television actress
- Known for: Yes Boss (1999–2003); Minus One (2005)

Sheetal Dnyaneshwar Agashe (Note: IAST: Śītala Jñāneśvara Āgāśe. Agashe bears her father's name (Dnyaneshwar) as a middle name as per the patronymic Marathi naming conventions, but she is widely known without her patronymic.) (born 17 May 1977) is an Indian businesswoman and former actress, who has been serving as the managing director of Brihans Natural Products since 2013.

A former actress, she had a recurring role from 1999 to 2003 on the sitcom Yes Boss (1999–2009), and a leading role in the independent film Minus One (2005). A self-published Hindi poet, she has also represented the interests of Indian women in business and in the healthcare industry with her appearances on the cover of the Pune edition of Femina in August 2021 and May 2022.

== Biography ==
=== Early life and education: 1977–2005 ===
Agashe was born on 17 May 1977 in Pune, Maharashtra, into an aristocratic and entrepreneurial Chitpavan brahmin family of industrialist Dnyaneshwar Agashe of the Agashe gharana of Mangdari, and wife Rekha Gogte, of the Gogte gharana of Belgaum.

Through her father, Agashe is a granddaughter of Chandrashekhar Agashe, a niece of Panditrao Agashe and Shakuntala Karandikar, a younger sister of Mandar and Ashutosh Agashe, of distant relation to Third Anglo-Maratha War general Bapu Gokhale, musician Ashutosh Phatak, historian Dinkar G. Kelkar, and scientist P. K. Kelkar.

Through her mother, Agashe is a great-niece of B. M. Gogte, a first cousin to poet Rashmi Parekh, a descendant of the aristocratic Latey (Bhagwat) family, and of relation to Kokuyo Camlin head Dilip Dandekar, and academic Jyoti Gogte.

Agashe grew up in Pune, where she attended Vidya Bhavan school. She then attended the Brihan Maharashtra College of Commerce where she acquired a B.Com degree, and was educated further at the University of Pune where she acquired an MBA in marketing and advertising.

=== Career in entertainment: 1999–2005 ===
Agashe initially began her career as a television and film actress in Bollywood. Between 1999 and 2003, she had a recurring role on the SAB TV sitcom Yes Boss, alongside Aasif Sheikh, Rakesh Bedi, Kavita Kapoor, and Delnaaz Irani. Her eponymous character was the personal assistant to Sheikh's character. In January 2000, her mother served as the official publisher of her collection of Hindi poetry titled तुम्हारे लिये (lit. 'For You'), which Agashe self-published under the mononym Sheital. (Note: Sheital being an alternate transliteration of her name in Marathi (शीतल); her name has been generally and widely transliterated into the Latin script as Sheetal.) In April 2002, she contributed an essay titled Father's Daughter to her father's festschrift.

In April 2005, she starred in a leading role alongside Archana Puran Singh and Seema Biswas in the English language independent film Minus One (2005), directed by Renny Mascarenhas. She subsequently left acting, stating that it was her father who encouraged her to transition from acting into business. She then began aiding her father and brothers in the family group of companies.

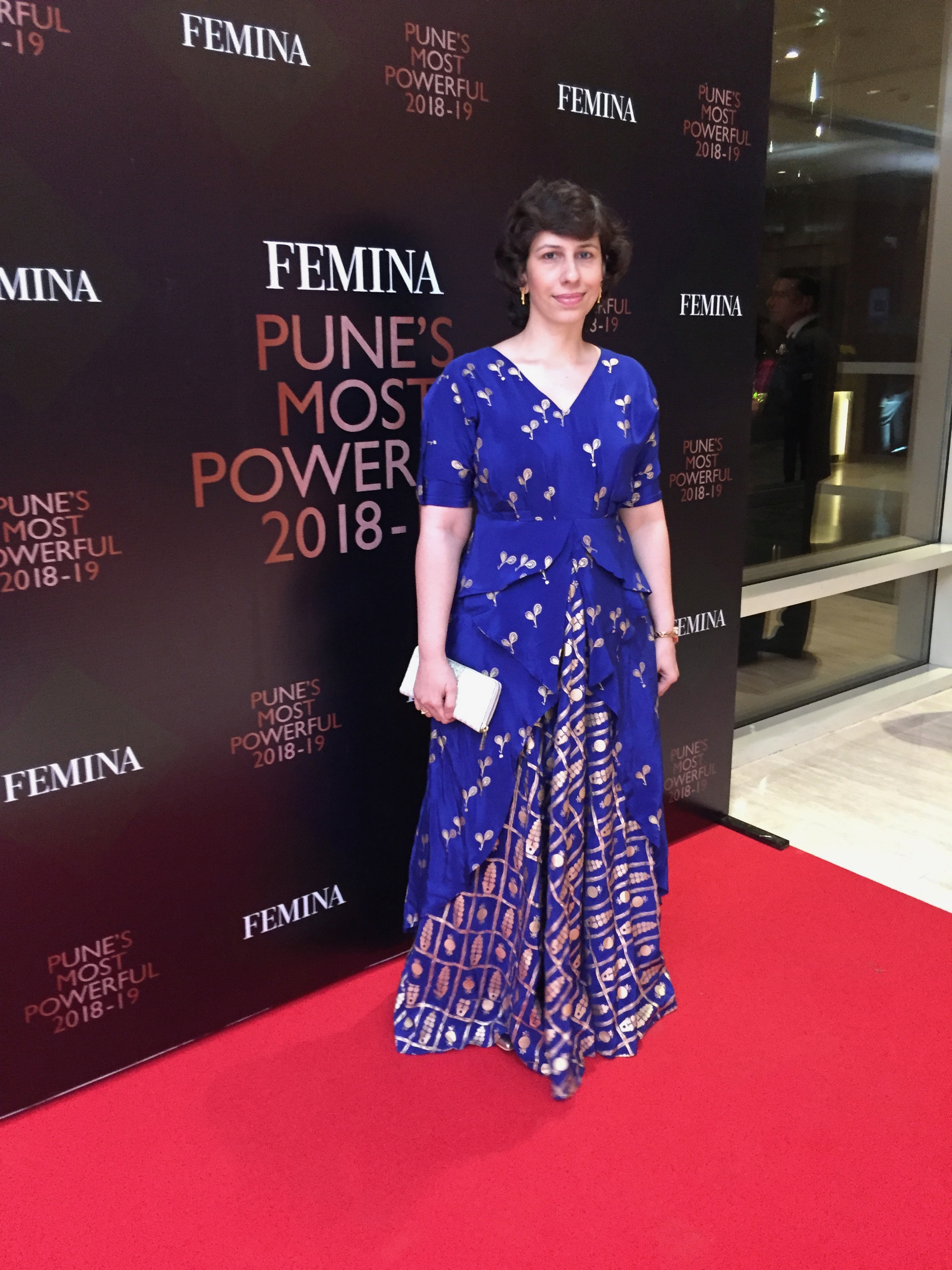
Agashe on the Femina Pune's Most Powerful Awards red carpet in July 2018

=== Career in business: 2005–present ===
In 2005, Agashe joined Brihans Natural Products Limited, an Ayurvedic skincare products manufacturing company founded by her brother Mandar Agashe in 2000, as their chief executive officer. She had previously been appointed director at her father's investment firm in 1999. In January 2013, she was appointed as the managing director for Brihans Natural Products, becoming the first woman in her family to head a business under their group of companies.

By May 2014, Agashe had limited the range of products being manufactured by the company, choosing to focus on Aloe vera as the prime ingredient in its products. In September 2015, she was an award presenter at the Shraavan Queen beauty pageant held in Mumbai and hosted by the Maharashtra Times. By 2016, she began restructuring the company's range under a single umbrella brand.

In April 2018, The Times of India awarded Agashe with a Times Visionary Award from their Pune chapter. The award was presented to her by Abhay Deol. In June 2018, she was the recipient of a Pune's Most Powerful Award from Femina, being presented the award by Huma Qureshi. In October 2018, she was an award presenter alongside Amyra Dastur for the Mrs. Stylista beauty pageant hosted by the magazine. In December 2018, she was the recipient of a business leadership award by the business research firm White Page India.

By 2019, Agashe had shifted Brihans Natural Products's production to locally sourcing the Aloe vera, Indian gooseberry, and hibiscus used in their products from Indian farmers in drought-prone districts such as Solapur in Maharashtra. She has also leveraged her Bollywood background to secure celebrity endorsements and film sponsorships for the company's brands. In April of that same year, she was the subject of an episode on Marathi businesswomen for Sakal Money. Later that same month, she was the recipient of a Times Women of the Year Award from The Times of India, being presented the award by Kiara Advani. In December that same year, she and Diana Penty presented the Filmfare Award for Woman of Style & Substance to Dia Mirza at the 6th Filmfare Glamour and Style Awards.

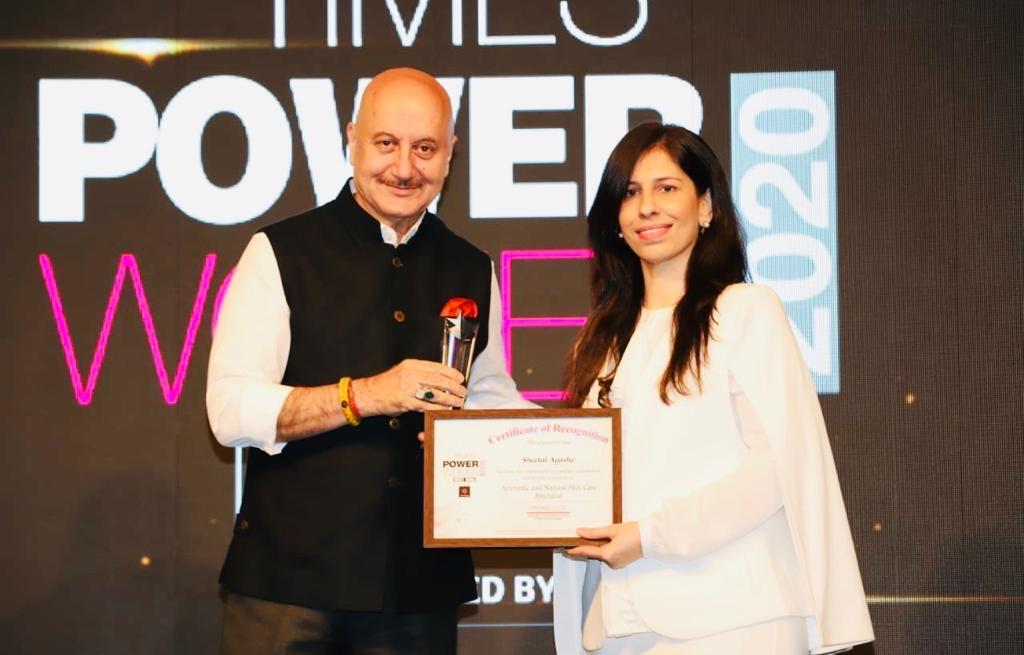
Agashe accepting her Times Power Women Award from Anupam Kher in January 2021

In January 2021, The Times of India praised Agashe, after her company launched Ayurvedic hand sanitisers and soaps in response to the COVID-19 pandemic in India in 2020, awarding her with a second Times Women of the Year Award that same month. The award was presented to her by Anupam Kher. In August 2021, she was one of the women in business featured on the cover of Femina's Independence Day issue of their Pune edition.

In May 2022, Agashe featured on the cover of Femina's Pune issue for their cover story on women in the healthcare industry. In August 2022, at the 67th Filmfare Awards, she and Dia Mirza presented the Filmfare Award for Best Story to Abhishek Kapoor, Supratik Sen and Tushar Paranjape, the writers of Chandigarh Kare Aashiqui (2021).

In June 2023, Agashe alongside Jonita Gandhi and Shilpa Rao presented the Grazia Millennial Award for Breakthrough Performer of the Year to Sanya Malhotra. In April 2024, alongside Hemant Dhome, she presented the Filmfare Award for Best Supporting Actor to tied winners Jitendra Joshi and Vithal Kale at the 8th Filmfare Awards Marathi. In October 2024, Agashe was one of the women entrepreneurs invited alongside Pankaja Munde to the lamp lighting ceremony at the inauguration of the Dhaga exhibition organised by Medha Vishram Kulkarni and the Ramabai Ambedkar Mahila Sabalikaran Kendra.

== Published works ==
=== Poetry collections ===
- Sheital (2000). तुम्हारे लिये [For You] (in Hindi). Illustrated by Sagade, Abhijeet. Shaniwar Peth, Pune: R. D. Agashe. ISBN 9798987233498 – via Google Books.

=== Essays ===
- Agashe, Sheetal (17 April 2002). "Father's Daughter". In Barve, Ramesh; Vartak, Taraprakash; Belvalkar, Sharchandra (eds.). पुत्र विश्वस्ताचा : गौरव ग्रंथ : ज्ञानेश्वर आगाशे षष्ट्यब्दीपूर्ती निमित्त [Putra Viśvastācā : A Festschrift : In honour of Dnyaneshwar Agashe's 60th Birth Anniversary] (Festschrift) (in Marathi) (1st ed.). Pune: Jñāneśvara Āgāśe Gaurava Samitī. pp. 4–5. ISBN 978-1-5323-4594-4. LCCN 2017322864. OCLC 992168227 – via University of Oxford.
  - Agashe, Sheetal (17 April 2022). "Father's Daughter". In Belvalkar, Sharatchandra; Vartak, Taraprakash; Barve, Ramesh (eds.). Putra Vishwastacha: A Festschrift to Dnyaneshwar Agashe. Translated by Phadnis, Nandan. Compiled by Agashe, Aditya (2nd ed.). Pune, Maharashtra: The Brihan Maharashtra Sugar Syndicate Ltd. p. 5–6. ISBN 9780578292250. LCCN 2021276707. OCLC 1325123469 – via Google Books.

=== Commercial literature ===
- Agashe, Sheetal, ed. (20 April 2022). Brihans Natural Products Brochure (Brochure). Illustrated by Biradar, Leena. Pune: Brihans Group. OCLC 1397301619 – via Google Books.

== Filmography ==
=== Film ===
Year	Title	Role	Notes
2005	Minus One	Dilshat	Independent film

=== Television ===
Year	Title	Role	Channel	Notes
1999–2003	Yes Boss	Sheetal	SAB TV	Recurring role
2018	Femina Pune's Most Powerful 2018–19	Herself	Zoom	TV special
2018	Femina Mrs. Stylista West 2018	Herself (presenter)	Zoom	TV special
2019	बिझनेसवूमन: शीतल आगाशे (lit. 'Businesswoman: Sheetal Agashe')	Herself (subject)	Sakal Money	TV special
2019	6th Filmfare Glamour and Style Awards	Herself (presenter)	ET Now	TV special
2022	67th Filmfare Awards	Herself (presenter)	Colors TV	TV special
2023	Grazia Millennial Awards 2023	Herself (presenter)	Times Now	TV special
2024	8th Filmfare Awards Marathi	Herself (presenter)	Colors Marathi	TV special

== Bibliography ==
- Agashe, Trupti; Agashe, Gopal. (2006). "मांगदरी घराणा" [The House of Mangdari]. In Wad, Mugdha (ed.). आगाशे कुलवृत्तांत [Genealogy of the Agashe Family] (Kulavruttanta) (in Marathi) (2nd ed.). Hyderabad: Surbhi Graphics. ISBN 978-1-5323-4500-5 – via Google Books.
- Barve, D. K. (1982). सागरमेघ: बा. म. ऊर्फ रावसाहेब गोगटे यांचा भैतिक व आत्मिक आविष्कार [Sagarmegh: The Physical and Spiritual Invention of B. M. "Raosaheb" Gogte] (in Marathi). Mumbai: Bombay Book Ḍepot. LCCN 82905037. OCLC 12024875 – via University of Michigan.
- Barve, Ramesh; Vartak, Taraprakash; Belvalkar, Sharchandra, eds. (17 April 2002). पुत्र विश्वस्ताचा : गौरव ग्रंथ : ज्ञानेश्वर आगाशे षष्ट्यब्दीपूर्ती निमित्त [Putra Viśvastācā : A Festschrift : In honour of Dnyaneshwar Agashe's 60th Birth Anniversary] (Festschrift) (in Marathi) (1st ed.). Pune: Jñāneśvara Āgāśe Gaurava Samitī. ISBN 978-1-5323-4594-4. LCCN 2017322864. OCLC 992168227 – via University of Oxford.
- Belvalkar, Sharatchandra; Vartak, Taraprakash; Barve, Ramesh, eds. (17 April 2022). Putra Vishwastacha: A Festschrift to Dnyaneshwar Agashe. Translated by Phadnis, Nandan. Compiled by Agashe, Aditya (2nd ed.). Pune, Maharashtra: The Brihan Maharashtra Sugar Syndicate Ltd. ISBN 9780578292250. LCCN 2021276707. OCLC 1325123469 – via Google Books.
- Hindi Cinema Year Book. Vol. 5. Mumbai: Screen World Publication. 2005. LCCN 2003306165. OCLC 53359577 – via University of Michigan.
- Kamath, M. V. (1 January 1991). The Makings of a Millionaire: A Tribute to a Living Legend, Raosaheb B.M. Gogte, Industrialist, Philanthropist & Educationist. Mumbai: Jaico Publishing House. LCCN 91906125. OCLC 25633742 – via University of California.
- Karandikar, Shakuntala (10 July 1992). विश्वस्त [Viśvasta] (in Marathi) (1st ed.). Pune: Śrī Prakāśana. ISBN 9781532345012. LCCN 2017322865. OCLC 992168228 – via University of Oxford.
- Karandikar, Shakuntala (14 February 2022). Agashe, Aditya (ed.). Vishwasta – The Trustee: The Life of Industrialist Chandrashekhar Agashe. Translated by Phadnis, Nandan (2nd ed.). Pune: The Brihan Maharashtra Sugar Syndicate Ltd. ISBN 9780578355863. LCCN 2021276641. OCLC 1310118266 – via Google Books.
- Kelkar, Bhaskar; Kelkar, Govind; Kelkar, Yashwant (1993). "कासारवेल – पुणे – धुळे घराणा" [The House of Kasarvel – Pune – Dhule]. केळकर कुलवृत्तांत [Genealogy of the Kelkar Family] (Kulavruttanta) (in Marathi) (2nd ed.). Pune: Yashoda Typesetting. Archived from the original on 26 August 2022 – via Google Books.
- Nair, Siddharth; K., Samir; Pahari, Aishi (2018). "Sheetal Agashe, MD, Brihans Natural Products Ltd.". In Sen, Anusua; Baweja, Garima; Zafar, S.; et al. (eds.). India's Most Admired Brands 2018–19 : Research by White Page (Coffee table book). Vol. VII. Research directed by Makky, M. Y. New Delhi: Pegasus Events & IQ Design Studio.
- Pathak, Gangadhar (1978). "पिरंदावण वाडी – तळेखाजण घराणा" [The House of Pirandavan Wadi – Talekhajan]. गोखले कुलवृत्तांत [Genealogy of the Gokhale Family] (Kulavruttanta) (in Marathi) (2nd ed.). Pune: Gokhale Kulavr̥ttānta Kāryakārī Maṇdaḷa. LCCN 81902590. OCLC 8113665 – via WorldCat.
- Ranade, Sadashiv (1974). "मांगदरी घराणा" [The House of Mangdari]. चितपावन कौशिक गोत्री आगाशे कुलवृत्तांत [Genealogy of the Chitpavan Agashe Family belonging to the Kaushik Gotra] (Kulavruttanta) (in Marathi). LCCN 74903020. OCLC 20388396 – via University of Michigan.
- Ranade, Sadashiv (1982). "जांभळी घराणा (पहिला)" [The First House of Jambli]. फाटक कुलवृत्तांत [Genealogy of the Phatak Family] (Kulavruttanta) (in Marathi) (2nd ed.). Pune: Phāṭaka Kula Samitī. LCCN 84900881. OCLC 20671450 – via Google Books.
- Rubeena Film Directory. Mumbai: Rubeena Collection. 2004. LCCN 2002248600. OCLC 50727183 – via University of Michigan.
- Sathe-Patwardhan, Radhika (2019). "The Boss Lady: Sheetal Agashe, MD, Brihans Natural Products". In Chaitanya, Tanya (ed.). Femina presents Pune's Most Powerful 2018–19 (Coffee table book). Mumbai: Worldwide Media. RNI 6253/59.
- "बेळगाव घराणा (दुसरे)" [The Second House of Belgaum]. गोगटे कुलवृत्तांत [Genealogy of the Gogte Family] (Kulavruttanta) (in Marathi) (2nd ed.). Mumbai: Gogaṭe Kulamaṇḍala. 2006. LCCN 2012338796. OCLC 781940117 – via Google Books.
