= CTRI =

CTRI may refer to:

- Central Tobacco Research Institute, an Indian tobacco research institute
- Clinical Trials Registry – India, the Indian government's clinical trials registry
- Committee for the Transition and Restoration of Institutions, the former ruling military junta of Gabon
