= Izzo (surname) =

- Pronunciation: Italian: [ˈittso]
- Language: Italian

Izzo is an Italian surname. Notable people with the surname include:

- Angelo Izzo, Italian pharmacologist
- Armando Izzo (born 1992), Italian footballer
- Jean-Claude Izzo (1945–2000), French poet, playwright, screenwriter, and novelist
- John Izzo, American and Canadian businessman, corporate advisor, speaker, bestselling author and an advocate for sustainable living
- Larry Izzo (born 1974), American football player
- Lorenza Izzo (born 1989), Chilean film actress and model
- Paul Izzo (born 1995), Australian professional football player
- Renato Izzo (1929-2009), Italian actor, voice actor and screenwriter
- Ryan Izzo (born 1995), American football player
- Simona Izzo (born 1953), Italian actress, voice actress, director and screenwriter
- Tom Izzo (born 1955), American college basketball coach
