= Izzo =

Izzo may refer to:

- Izzo (surname), including a list of people with the name
- "Izzo (H.O.V.A.)", or "H to the Izzo", a 2001 single by Jay-Z
- -izzle and -izzo, a slang suffix to form hip-hop-sounding words
