= Schedule J =

Lists diseases that drugs cannot claim to treat in India

The Schedule J of the Drugs and Cosmetics Rules, 1945 of India contains "a list of diseases and ailments which a drug may not claim to prevent or cure". Under Rule 106 of the Drugs and Cosmetics Act, 1940, a drug cannot make claims to treat or prevent any of the diseases or reform the conditions listed.

== List ==
According to the last changes introduced in 1996 by the Government of India by the Notification No. G.S.R. 21(E), the list as follows:

1. AIDS
2. Angina Pectoris
3. Appendicitis
4. Arteriosclerosis
5. Blindness
6. Blood poisoning
7. Bronchial asthma
8. Cancer and benign tumour
9. Cataract
10. Change in colour of hair and growth of new hair
11. Change of foetal sex by using drugs
12. Congenital malformations
13. Deafness
14. Diabetes
15. Diseases and Disorders of the uterus
16. Epileptic fits and psychiatric disorders
17. Encephalitis
18. Fairness of the skin
19. Form and structure of the breast
20. Gangrene
21. Genetic disorders
22. Glaucoma
23. Goitre
24. Hernia
25. High/low blood pressure
26. Hydrocele
27. Insanity
28. Increase in brain capacity and improvement of memory
29. Improvement in height of children/adults
30. Improvement in size and shape of the sexual organ and in duration of sexual performance
31. Improvement in the strength of the natural teeth
32. Improvement in vision
33. Jaundice/Hepatitis/Liver disorders
34. Leukaemia
35. Leucoderma
36. Maintenance or improvement of the capacity of the human being for sexual pleasure
37. Mental retardation, subnormalities and growth
38. Myocardial infarction
39. Obesity
40. Paralysis
41. Parkinsonism
42. Piles and Fistulae
43. Power to rejuvenate
44. Premature ageing
45. Premature greying of hair
46. Rheumatic heart diseases
47. Sexual impotence, premature ejaculation and spermatorrhoea
48. Spondylitis
49. Stammering
50. Stones in gall-bladder, kidney, bladder
51. Vericose vein

== Notable verdicts ==
The Kerala High Court in December 2001 responding to a Public Interest Litigation restrained one T. A. Majeed, proprietor of the Kochi-based Fair Pharma, from manufacturing and marketing a drug called Immuno-QR, which he claimed to cure HIV/AIDS, or any drug under Schedule J. The manufacturer held a patent for a drug for treating general weakness and fatigue, but not AIDS. The petitioners, People's Union for Civil Liberties, had asked the court the manufacturers should be allowed to sell the Ayurvedic drug only after it has undergone clinical trials, under the supervision of National Institute for Communicable Diseases and the Centre for Advanced Research in Virology.

== See also ==
- Drugs and Magic Remedies (Objectionable Advertisements) Act, 1954
- Drug policy of India
