= Clinical trials on Ayurveda =

Subclass of clinical trials

Clinical trials on Ayurveda refers to any clinical trials done on Ayurvedic treatment. Ayurveda is a traditional medicine system in India and like other cultural medical practices includes both conventional medicine and also complementary and alternative medicine. When there are clinical trials in Ayurveda, the focus tends to be on practices in alternative medicine.

A 2017 essay described that in India, Ayurveda is inadequately equipped to manage many modern diseases, owing to insufficient research and development. The essay argued that clinical trials in ayurveda should focus on areas outside the scope of modern medicine.

Also, while there is a short history of clinical research on Ayurvedic treatments, there is no existing systematic review available which identifies all the studies and interprets them as a whole.

Educational organizations which teach Ayurveda require training if they are to design clinical trials on Ayurvedic treatments.

As of 2016 the Clinical Trials Registry – India contained approximately 200 records of clinical trials on Ayurvedic treatments.

== List of clinical trials ==
Of all the recorded clinical trials, the following treatments are those for which there are meta-analyses of multiple trials:

- Bacopa monnieri for cognitive skill
- Withania somnifera for anxiety
- treatment for osteoarthritis
- Yoga as treatment
