= Pharmacovigilance Programme of India =

Government regulatory agency

Organisation overview
- Formed: 2010
- Type: Regulatory body
- Parent department: Indian Pharmacopoeia Commission
- Website: cdsco.gov.in/opencms/opencms/en/PvPI/

The Pharmacovigilance Programme of India (PvPI) is an Indian government organization which identifies and responds to drug safety problems. Its activities include receiving reports of adverse drug events and taking necessary action to remedy problems. The Central Drugs Standard Control Organisation established the program in July 2010 with All India Institute of Medical Sciences, New Delhi as the National Coordination Centre, which later shifted to Indian Pharmacopoeia Commission in Ghaziabad on 15 April 2011.

== History ==
Many developed countries set up their pharmacovigilance programs following the Thalidomide scandal in the 1960s. India set up its program in the 1980s. This general concept of drug safety monitoring went through different forms, but the Central Drugs Standard Control Organisation established the present Pharmacovigilance Program of India in 2010. Now the program is well integrated with government legislation, a regulator as leader, and a research center as part of the Indian Pharmacopoeia Commission.

== Activities ==
As of 2018 there were 250 centers around India capable of responding to reports of serious adverse reactions. One of the challenges of the organization is training doctors and hospitals to report adverse drug reactions when patients have them. The Pharmacovigilance Program makes these reports itself, but ideally, such reports could originate from any clinic. The Pharmacovigilance Programme seeks to encourage a culture and social expectation of reporting drug problems.

One of the successes of the program was detecting adverse effects of people in India using carbamazepine. While this drug is safer among people native to the Europe, people of South Asia have different genetics and are more likely to experience problems when using it. Other countries could not have been able to detect this problem, and the Pharmacovigilance Programme's detection of it was a success story.

== Collaboration ==
The establishment of the Pharmacovigilance Program made India a more attractive international destination for foreign companies to bring clinical trials research. Understanding the quality of India's pharmacovigilance programme is key to international researchers conducting trials in India.

The program collaborates both in India and internationally with the World Health Organization on projects for safe medication. As a collaborating center, the Pharmacovigilance Programme assists the WHO in developing international policy for other countries to manage their own drug safety programs.

While the United States and Europe have pharmacovigilance systems which are developed well in some ways, the Indian programme has more and specialized expertise to apply for the unique circumstances of India. The Pharmaceutical industry in India produces more drugs than any other national industry. Because of the large amount of drugs and the many countries which import them, the Indian program monitors in some ways more than anywhere else.
