= Swasthya Adhikar Manch =

Swasthya Adhikar Manch is a nonprofit organization in India which advocates for safety in clinical trials.

A women's branch advocated for health safety.

Amulya Nidhi has said that pharma companies wish to avoid all regulation of their research, and because of this, people have to advocate for themselves.

The organization filed a public interest litigation in 2012 asking for government intervention. That petition became Swasthya Adhikar Manch v. Union of India, a court case. The Supreme Court of India sided with the organization in 2013 on a case about clinical trial safety. In response, the government halted approval of new clinical trials until regulation was in place.

The organization has made some progress in improving safety of clinical trials.

In 2020 the organization commented that despite advances, transparency of health research information for the research participant is still not a common practice.
