= John Izzo =

John Izzo is a businessman and author. He was formerly an adjunct professor at the University of British Columbia. Izzo is the author of nine books, and is a Distinguished Fellow at the Stimson Center and a former Fellow at the East West Institute. He is co-host of the podcast The Way Forward.

== Early life and education ==
Izzo graduated from Hofstra University with a B.A. in Sociology and Journalism in 1979. He earned a M.Div. from McCormick Theological Seminary, Chicago, Illinois, in 1981. He graduated with a Ph.D. in Communication Studies from Kent State University in 1992.

== Career ==
Izzo began his career as Presbyterian minister, serving in three churches in Ohio and California from 1981 to 1987. He then worked for five years as an organization-development consultant and manager for the City of San Diego and Kaiser Permanente, San Diego. He then was Vice-President of Einstein Consulting Group in Philadelphia.

Izzo opened a business-consulting practice in Vancouver, BC, and became an instructor in communication at San Diego State University and Kent State University. He acted as a consultant to private companies, government agencies and NGOs, including Northrop Grumman, TELUS, BAE Systems, Lockheed Martin, Tim Horton's, McDonald's, RBC, Georgia Power, Best Buy, Qantas Airlines, IBM, Verizon, the Mayo Clinic, and Fairmont Hotels. His work has been featured by Newsweek, Fast Company, the Wall Street Journal, CNN, The New York Times, Maclean's and ABC World News. He has spoken or been interviewed on about 100 radio stations and television networks in the U.S. and Canada.

His first book, Awakening Corporate Soul, was published in 1994, and concerned employee engagement.

In 1998, Izzo joined the board of the Canadian Parks and Wilderness Society in Vancouver, BC, and served as its chair from 2000 to 2004. He was also the Conservation Chair of the Sierra Club, California from 1990 to 1994, and Chair of the North American NGO Environmental Caucus, UN Conference on Population and Development in Cairo, Egypt in 1994.

Izzo published his second book, Values Shift-Engaging, Retaining & Motivating the Multigenerational Workforce, in 2007. The book pointed out shifts in the new generation of employees and profiled companies which had made corresponding workplace changes. Later that year he published The Five Secrets You must Discover before You Die, which was named the best self-help book of 2008 by the Independent Book Publishers Association. His 2012 book, Stepping Up, is about personal responsibility in life, work and society.

Izzo has given many talks on green business and sustainability at conferences around the world. He has spoken at schools across Canada and the United States and consulted with large educational associations. In 2013, he gave a TedX talk in Vancouver entitled "The Defining Moment for a Generation-In-Waiting". He was host and producer of the five-hour Biography and PBS TV series, The Five Secrets You Must Discover before You Die, based on his 2008 book.

In 2014 Izzo worked on a project in East Africa to educate women to become successful entrepreneurs. He currently serves on the Advisory Board of Sustainable Brands. He also serves on the Board of the Elders Action Network.

Izzo is the author of about 60 articles in peer-reviewed and trade publications. He is a blog columnist for CSRwire and the Huffington Post, and has been a business columnist for The Globe and Mail newspaper in Toronto.

He is a citizen of both the United States of America and Canada. He lives in Victoria, British Columbia and Rancho Mirage, California.

== Published works ==
- Stepping Up: How Taking Responsibility Changes Everything, Second Edition(2020) Berrett-Koehler Publishers; ISBN 9781523091454.
- The Purpose Revolution: How Leaders Create Engagement and Competitive Advantage in an Age of Social Good (with Jeff Vanderwielen, 2018), Berrett-Koehler Publishers; ISBN 9781626569669.
- The Five Thieves of Happiness (2017), Berrett-Koehler Publishers; ISBN 9781626569324.
- Stepping Up: How Taking Responsibility Changes Everything (2012), Berrett-Koehler Publishers; ISBN 9781609940577
- Awakening Corporate Soul: Four Paths to Unleash the Power of People at Work. 1994 with Eric Klein.
- The Five Secrets You Must Discover Before You Die (2008), Berrett-Koehler Publishers; ISBN 9781576754757
- Values Shift: Recruiting, Retaining and Engaging the Multigenerational Workforce. 2007, with Pam Withers.
- Second Innocence: Rediscovering Joy and Wonder (2004), Berrett-Koehler Publishers; ISBN 9781576752630
