= Schedule X =

Class of prescription drugs in India

Schedule X is a class of prescription drugs in India appearing as an appendix to the Drugs and Cosmetics Rules introduced in 1945. These are drugs which cannot be purchased over the counter without a valid prescription of a Registered Medical Practitioner (RMP). Also, the retailer has to preserve the prescription for a period of two years.

== Included drugs ==
The following are the Schedule X drugs mentioned in the Drugs and Cosmetics Rules 1945:

The list of Schedule X drugs:

- Amobarbital
- Amphetamine
- Barbital
- Cyclobarbital
- Dexamphetamine
- Ethchlorvynol
- Glutethimide
- Ketamine
- Meprobamate
- Methamphetamine
- Methylphenidate
- Methylphenobarbital
- Pentobarbital
- Phencyclidine
- Phenmetrazine
- Secobarbital

Preparations containing the above substances are also covered by this Schedule. Any stereoisometric form of the substance specified in this Schedule, any salt of the substance and preparation containing such substances are also covered by this Schedule.
