= National Institute of Agricultural Marketing =

Research and higher education institute in Rajasthan, India

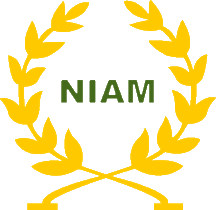
- Motto: Mavens of Agribusiness
- Type: Autonomous
- Established: August 1988
- Director general: Shri Faiz Ahmed Kidwai, IAS
- Location: Jaipur, Rajasthan, India; 26.7966°N 75.8040°E
- Campus: Urban
- Website: www.ccsniam.gov.in

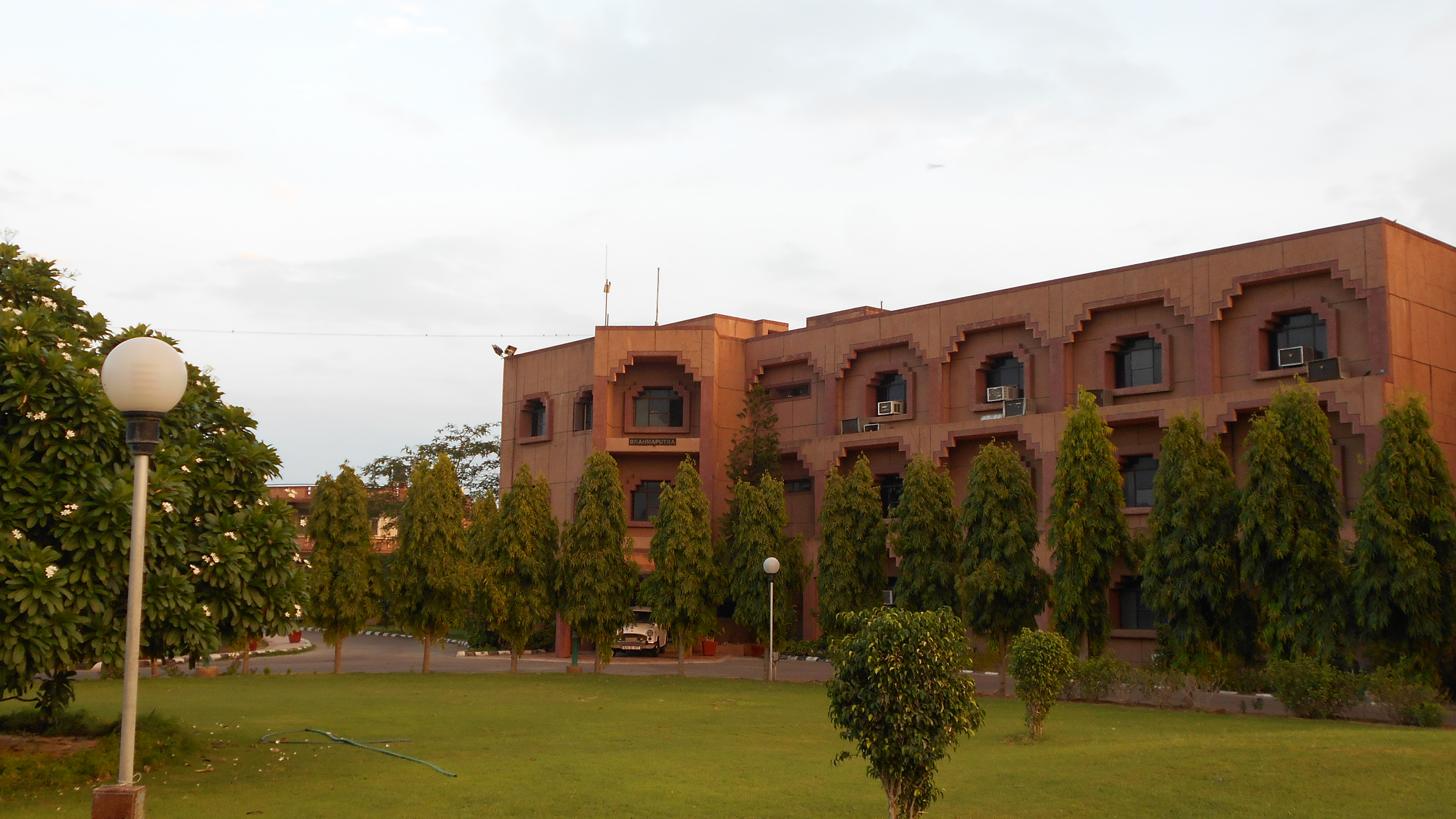
Administrative Building of the National Institute of Agricultural Marketing

The National Institute of Agricultural Marketing (NIAM), or in its full name Chaudhary Charan Singh National Institute of Agricultural Marketing (CCS NIAM), is a research and higher-education institute operating under the Ministry of Agriculture and Farmers' Welfare of India and focusing on agricultural marketing. Established in 1988, it is located in Jaipur, Rajasthan, India.
