= Drugs and Cosmetics Act, 1940 =

Act of the Parliament of India

Imperial Legislative Council
- Long title: An Act to regulate the import, manufacture, distribution and sale of drugs and cosmetics.
- Citation: Act No. 23 of 1940
- Territorial extent: India
- Passed by: Imperial Legislative Council
- Passed: 10 April 1940

Amended by
- See Amendments
- Status: In force

The Drugs and Cosmetics Act, 1940 is an act of the Imperial Legislative Council which regulates the import, manufacture and distribution of drugs in India. The primary objective of the act is to ensure that the drugs and cosmetics sold in India are safe, effective and conform to state quality standards. The related Drugs and Cosmetics Rules, 1945 contain provisions for classification of drugs under given schedules and provide guidelines for the storage, sale, display and prescription of each schedule.

== Summary ==
This act was originally known as the Drug Act and was passed in 1940. The original act was prepared in accordance to the recommendations of the Chopra Committee formed in 1930. The related Drugs Rules was passed in 1945. Since 1940, the act has undergone several amendments and is now known as the Drugs and Cosmetics Act, 1940.

The term "drug" as defined in the act, includes various substances, diagnostic, and medical devices. The act defines "cosmetic" as any product that is meant to be applied to the human body for the purpose of beautifying or cleansing. The definition however excludes soaps. In 1964, the act was amended to include Ayurveda and Unani drugs.

The Section 16 of the act defines the standards of quality for drugs. The Section 17 defines "misbranding". A drug is considered misbranded if it claims to be of more therapeutic value than it actually is. The manufacturer of such a drug may be asked to suspend the manufacture of the drug under Section 18. Section 27 deals with fake and adulterated drugs. The act requires more of that ingredients of the drugs should be printed on the label.

The Section 22 defines the powers of the drug inspectors and Section 23 defines the strict procedure which should be followed by the inspectors during any raids.

== Controversy ==
The act lacks specific penalties for violating provisions relating to clinical trials. As a result, no penalties could be imposed on the Bill and Melinda Gates Foundation-funded Programme for Appropriate Technology in Health (PATH) for violating norms in conducting the HPV vaccination trials on tribal girls in Andhra Pradesh and Gujarat. On 17 April 2015, the government told the Supreme Court of India that due to lack of specific penalties, the government could only halt the trials and issued warnings. The trial had been found to be unethical by a Parliamentary committee in 2013.

== Amendments ==
The act has been amended several times. The following are a list of amending acts:

1. The Drugs (Amendment) Act, 1960 (35 of 1960)
2. The Drugs (Amendment) Act, 1962 (21 of 1962)
3. The Drugs and Cosmetics (Amendment) Act, 1964 (13 of 1964)
4. The Drugs and Cosmetics (Amendment) Act, 1972 (19 of 1972)
5. The Drugs and Cosmetics (Amendment) Act, 1982 (68 of 1982)
6. The Drugs and Cosmetics (Amendment) Act, 1986 (71 of 1986)
7. The Drugs and Cosmetics (Amendment) Act, 1995 (71 of 1995)
8. The Drugs and Cosmetics (Amendment) Act, 2008 (26 of 2008)

== See also ==
- Drug policy of India
- Drugs and Magic Remedies (Objectionable Advertisements) Act, 1954

== Bibliography ==
- Malik, Vijay (2014). Law Relating to Drugs and Cosmetics (24th ed.). Lucknow: Eastern Book Company. ISBN 978-93-5145-313-0.
- Malik, Surendra (2016). Supreme Court on Narcotics and Drugs (2nd ed.). Lucknow: Eastern Book Company. ISBN 978-93-5145-318-5.
- Malik, Surendra (2014). Supreme Court on Drugs, Medical Laws and Medical Negligence (1st ed.). Lucknow: Eastern Book Company. ISBN 978-93-5028-850-4.
