= Dr. D. Y. Patil Medical College, Hospital & Research Centre =

Hospital in Pune, Maharashtra, India

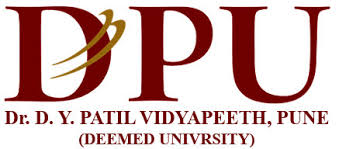
- Established: 1996; 30 years ago
- Affiliations: Dr. D. Y. Patil Vidyapeeth, Pune
- Dean: Dr. J. S. Bhawalkar
- Undergraduates: 250
- Location: Pimpri, Pune, Maharashtra, India
- Website: medical.dpu.edu.in

Dr. D. Y. Patil Medical College, Hospital & Research Centre is a medical college facility located in Pune, Maharashtra, India. It has 250 undergraduate seats for MBBS course.

== History ==
Dr. D. Y. Patil Medical College, Hospital, and Research Centre were founded in 1996 as Dr. D.Y. Patil Medical College for Women. It was formerly affiliated with the University of Pune and was later affiliated with Maharashtra University of Health Sciences . Presently it is a part of Dr. D. Y. Patil Vidyapeeth, Pune, which is recognized as a Deemed University. The Vidyapeeth holds accreditations from National Assessment and Accreditation Council (NAAC) with an 'A++' grade and is ISO 9001:2015 certified. Dr. P. D Patil acts as the Chancellor, and Dr. Bhagyashree Patil as the Pro-chancellor of the University. At Dr. D Y Patil Hospital, Dr. Yashraj Patil serves as a Trustee and Treasurer, and Dr. Manisha Karmarkar holds the role of Chief Executive Officer.

University and college rankings

Medical – India
- NIRF (2024): 11

Dental – India
- NIRF (2024): 5

== Academics ==
In January 2024, a study was carried out in partnership with Dr. D Y Patil Medical College Hospital and Research Centre in Pune, India, and Harvard Medical School in the USA. This study, which was recently published in PLOS One, offers practical recommendations to enhance tuberculosis care (TB) and multidrug-resistant tuberculosis (MDR-TB).

=== Courses ===
A Bachelor of Medicine and Bachelor of Surgery (M.B.B.S) is the initial undergraduate medical degree granted by the institution. After completing three years of residential training, doctors can pursue further specialization through a Postgraduate Doctor of Medicine (M.D.) or Master of Surgery (M.S.) degree. The Ph.D. program typically lasts a minimum of 3 years, involving coursework, and can extend up to a maximum of 6 years. M.Sc. degrees are obtained after three years of advanced training as a senior resident. Super Specialty qualifications are attained after an additional three years of specialized training.

Degree	Specialties
MBBS (Undergraduate degree)	Microbiology, Psychology, Biology, Biochemistry, Public health, Exercise Science, Nursing, Biomedical Engineering, Nuclear medicine, Clinical physiology, Health Administration, Optometry
Doctor of Medicine (MD)	Anatomy, Anesthesiology, Biochemistry, Dermatology, Emergency Medicine, Forensic Medicine, General Medicine, Hospital Administration, Immunohematology, Microbiology, Pathology, Palliative Care, Pediatrics, Pharmacology, Physiology, Respiratory Medicine, Radiodiagnosis and Radiotherapy
Master of Surgery	Orthopaedics, Urology, Otorhinolaryngology, Ophthalmology, Obstetrics & Gynaecology, General Surgery
Super Speciality	Cardio Vascular and Thoracic, Cardiology, Nephrology, Neurology Neurosurgery, Plastic Surgery, Urology
M.Sc.	Pharmacology, Anatomy, Physiology, Biochemistry, Microbiology

=== Rankings ===
In 2020, the Institute ranked 24th in the medical category according to the National Institutional Ranking Framework (NIRF).

Additionally, in the "Health Times All India Multispeciality Hospital Ranking Survey 2021," the institution was ranked 8th in the Western Region and 3rd in the Pune Region.

Furthermore, according to a survey conducted by India Today, the institution was ranked 2nd among private universities in India.

In 2022, the National Institutional Ranking Framework (NIRF) ranked Dr. D. Y. Patil Medical College, Hospital and Research Centre, Pune, at the 17th position across India and the 1st position among medical colleges in Maharashtra, as recognized by the Ministry of Human Resource Development (MHRD).

In 2023, the Institute was ranked 3rd in the Dental category according to the National Institutional Ranking Framework (NIRF).

In 2024, the Institute was ranked 11th in the medical category and 5th in Dental by the National Institutional Ranking Framework (NIRF).

=== Admission ===
The institute admits 250 students for the undergraduate MBBS course. Admission is solely based on the 'All India Rank' achieved in the NEET (UG) conducted by NTA. Similarly, for postgraduate and super specialty courses, admissions are determined by the rankings obtained in NEET (PG) and NEET (SS) respectively.

== DPU Super Specialty Hospital ==
DPU Super Specialty Hospital, Pimpri is an Indian multispeciality hospital located in Pimpri, Pune, Maharashtra. Established in 1996, the hospital operates under Dr. D. Y. Patil Vidyapeeth.

DPU Super Specialty Hospital started operations in Pune in 1996. Dr. P. D. Patil serves as its chancellor. It is a 2,011-bed hospital in Pune with 30 operation theatres and 200 staff members. Its cancer department is headed by Dr. Sameer Gupta, and the CEO of the hospital is Dr. Manisha Karmarkar. In November 2023, the hospital launched the breast cancer awareness initiative Walk for Pink to promote early detection. In April 2024, the hospital collaborated with Pinkholic India to organize an all-women car rally in Pimpri, India, to raise awareness about organ donation in the city.

== Organ transplants ==
In November 2023, the college with the support of the Rashtriya Bal Swasthya Karyakram (RBSK) scheme, initiated a cochlear implant program for deaf-mute children.

== Awards and recognition ==
In 2018, Dr. D. Y. Patil Medical College, Hospital, and Research Centre in Pune secured a position in the Guinness Book of World Records. This recognition comes from their feat of screening the highest number of individuals for hypertension within a single hour, an event held on the eve of World Heart Day.

In February 2020, the medical college was honored with a National Award in the Green Hospital Category by the Association of HealthCare Providers, located in New Delhi.

Additionally, the institution was honored with the 'Golden Aim Award' in 2022.

Dr. Amitav Banerjee, who is a Professor of Community Medicine and also the Chief Editor of the Medical Journal, along with Dr. Sarika Chaturvedi, a Senior Scientist, and Dr. Sachin Atre, a Research Consultant and Adjunct Faculty at the Department of Community Medicine, all from Dr DY Patil Medical College, Hospital & Research Centre, have been acknowledged as part of the 'Top 2% Scientists around the World in the Stanford University Rankings 2023'.
