= Pharmacognosy Research =

Open-access medical journal

- Discipline: Pharmacognosy
- Language: English

Publication details
- History: 2009-present
- Publisher: Medknow Publications
- Frequency: Quarterly

Standard abbreviations
- ISO 4: Pharmacogn. Res.

Indexing
- ISSN: 0976-4836 (print); 0974-8490 (web)

Links
- Journal homepage

Pharmacognosy Research is a peer-reviewed open-access medical journal published on behalf of the Pharmacognosy Network Worldwide. The journal publishes articles on the subject of pharmacognosy, natural products, and phytochemistry and is indexed with CASPUR, EBSCO, ProQuest, and Scopus.
