= Baidyanath Group =

Indian pharmaceutical Company

- Type: Private
- Industry: Medicines; Healthcare
- Founded: 1917; 109 years ago
- Founder: Ram Dayal Joshi; Ram Narayan Sharma
- Headquarters: Kolkata, India
- Area served: Worldwide
- Products: Ayurvedic Medicines; Herbal Skin care; Health supplements
- Number of employees: 5000 (March 2020)
- Website: Baidyanath

Baidyanath Group is an Ayurvedic pharmaceutical company in India.

== History ==
Shree Baidyanath Ayurved Bhawan (Pvt) Limited was founded in 1917 by two brothers, Vaidya Pandit Ram Narayan Sharma and his brother Pandit Ram Dayal Joshi. Sharma and Pandit started a large-scale production of Ayurvedic formulations from the centers: Kolkata (1921), Patna (1940), Jhansi (1941), Nagpur (1942) and Prayagraj (1958).

During the tenure of Shree Baidyanath Ayurved Bhawan, new work came up at Baddi (Solan), Himachal Pradesh in the year 1995. Now, new plants exist at Barotiwala (Himachal Pradesh), Kashipur (Uttarakhand), and Seoni (Madhya Pradesh).

The current Managing Directors of Baidyanath Group are Ram K Sharma at Kolkata, Suresh Kumar Sharma at Nagpur, Ajay Sharma at Prayagraj and Anurag Sharma at Jhansi.
