= Pharmaceutical Export Promotion Council =

The Pharmaceutical Export Promotion Council of India (Pharmexcil) is the authorized agency of the government of India for promotion of pharmaceutical exports from India. It was set up under the provisions of Foreign Trade Policy by the Ministry of Commerce and Industry in May 2004. Various pharmaceutical products, namely, bulk drugs, formulations, Biotech Products, Indian Systems of medicines, herbal products, diagnostics, clinical research, etc. are covered under its purview. Pharmexcil takes up several external trade promotion activities by organizing trade delegations outside India, arranging buyer-seller meetings, international seminars, etc.

The agency's headquarters is located in Hyderabad. Present Chairman is Dr Dinesh Dua, Nectar Life Sciences Ltd, Late Shri D.B. Mody was the founding chairman.

The Indian pharmaceutical industry has become the third largest producer in the world and is poised to grow into an industry of $20 billion in 2015 from the current turnover of $12 billion.

Its current chairperson is Sahil Munjal. In 2022, the organization is planning to increase India's export of medicine to China.
