= Central Drugs Standard Control Organisation =

Indian Apex Drug Regulatory Body

Coordinates: 28.632309°N 77.235531°E

Organisation overview
- Type: Regulatory body
- Headquarters: New Delhi, India
- Annual budget: ₹3,358 crore (US$350 million) ▼ (2021 - 2022)
- Minister responsible: Jagat Prakash Nadda, Minister of Health and Family Welfare
- Organisation executive: Rajeev Singh Raghuvanshi, Drugs Controller General of India
- Parent department: Directorate General of Health Services, Ministry of Health and Family Welfare
- Website: cdsco.gov.in and www.cdscoonline.gov.in

The Central Drugs Standard Control Organisation (CDSCO) is India's national regulatory body for cosmetics, pharmaceuticals and medical devices. It serves a similar function to the Food and Drug Administration (FDA) of the United States or the European Medicines Agency of the European Union. The Indian government has announced its plan to bring all medical devices, including implants and contraceptives under a review of the Central Drugs and Standard Control Organisation (CDSCO).

Within the CDSCO, the Drug Controller General of India (DCGI) regulates pharmaceutical and medical devices and is positioning within the Ministry of Health and Family Welfare. The DCGI is advised by the Drug Technical Advisory Board (DTAB) and the Drug Consultative Committee (DCC). Divided into zonal offices, each one carries out pre-licensing and post-licensing inspections, post-market surveillance, and drug recalls (where necessary). Manufacturers who deal with the authority required to name an Authorized Indian Representative (AIR) to represent them in all dealings with the CDSCO in India.

== Divisions ==
Central Drugs Standard Control Organization has 8 divisions:

- BA/BE
- New Drugs
- Medical Device & Diagnostics
- DCC-DTAB
- Import & Registration
- Biological
- Cosmetics
- Clinical Trials

== Criticism ==
The CDSCO has been criticized for having far lower standards for drug approval than the United States' Food and Drug Administration and European Union's European Medicines Agency. In a 2015 interview, the current Drugs Controller General, G. N. Singh, admitted that if the CDSCO held Indian pharmaceutical manufacturers to American standards, most would fail.

A March 2025 investigation by Vidya Krishnan and Arshu John in Himal Southasian criticised India's drug-regulatory framework for lax laws, exploitable regulatory loopholes and inadequate enforcement, arguing that these failures were compounded by pharmaceutical-industry lobbying. The investigation highlighted weaknesses in the oversight of spurious and substandard medicines, including a case in which counterfeit anti-cancer drugs bearing the name of a company whose manufacturing licence had been cancelled in 2021 were seized in Telangana in 2023.

== See also ==
- Healthcare in India
- National Health Authority
- Drugs and Cosmetics Act, 1940
- Indian Council of Medical Research
- Hindustan Antibiotics Limited
- Drugs Controller General of India
- National Pharmaceutical Pricing Authority
- Indian Pharmacopoeia Commission
- Pharmaceutical Export Promotion Council
- Food Safety and Standards Authority of India
- Pharmacy Council of India
- Pharmaceutical industry in India
- National Medical Commission
- Ministry of Health and Family Welfare
- National Commission for Indian System of Medicine
- Rajasthan Right to Health Care Act 2022
- Drugs and Magic Remedies (Objectionable Advertisements) Act, 1954
