= Angelo Izzo =

Italian pharmacologist

Angelo A. Izzo is an Italian pharmacologist and professor in the Department of Pharmacy in the School of Medicine and Surgery of the University of Naples Federico II. He serves as editor-in-chief of the peer-reviewed journal Phytotherapy Research. He was named an ISI highly cited researcher in 2014 and was elected a fellow of the British Pharmacological Society in 2016.
