= Swasthya Adhikar Manch v. Union of India =

2013 Supreme Court of India case

- Court: Supreme Court of India
- Full case name: Swasthya Adhikar Manch and Ors. versus Union of India & Ors..
- Decided: 21 October 2013; 11 years ago

Swasthya Adhikar Manch v. Union of India was a 2013 court case in which Swasthya Adhikar Manch requested additional government regulation in the management of clinical trials. The court found in favor of that organization and ordered regulation.

One of the complaints was enrolling research participants without proper informed consent.

Results of the ruling include that contract research organizations must register with the government, trials must define how they will give compensation to research participants in case of injury, researchers must report guidelines for safe use of the study drugs in advance of beginning the trial, and there must be draft rules defining what conditions must be met before a trial begins.

Various regulatory changes followed the ruling.

Any company seeking approval to do clinical trials has to report the risks and benefits to patients for the research.

As a result of the ruling in 2014 India published new requirements for clinical trials.

The Supreme Court reprimanded an organization for not compensating victims who were injured.
