= Clinical Trials Registry – India =

India's clinical trial registry

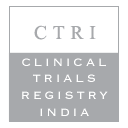

Agency overview
- Parent department: ICMR's National Institute of Medical Statistics
- Website: https://ctri.nic.in/

Clinical Trials Registry – India (CTRI) is the government of India's official clinical trial registry. The National Institute of Medical Statistics of the Indian Council of Medical Research established the CTRI on 20 July 2007. Since 2009 the Central Drugs Standard Control Organisation has mandated that anyone conducting clinical trials in India must preregister before enrolling any research participants.

== History ==
In 2004 the International Committee of Medical Journal Editors published the ICMJE recommendations, which advocated that medical journals only publish clinical research if the researchers have registered it. This statement had global influence and started conversations about clinical trial registration in India.

The Indian Council of Medical Research established the CTRI on 20 July 2007. By the end of 2007 the registry indexed 31 trials. In February 2008 various editors of medical journals in India pledged to avoid publishing articles about any clinical trial in India which was not registered.

The Central Drugs Standard Control Organisation made trial registration mandatory on 15 June 2009. The rule was that researchers must pre-register trials before the enrollment of any research participants. In April 2018 the CTRI reiterated this rule, saying that there had been a practice of starting clinical trials and enrolling patients without registering the trial. There had been past calls for preregistration.

== Data collected ==
The CTRI requests all the information which the World Health Organization recommends for clinical trial registries. Additionally, the CTRI collects information specific to the circumstances of India, including the address of the principal investigator, the name of the ethics committee overseeing the trial and confirmation of their government registration; proof of permission from the Drugs Controller General of India, the expected end date of the trial; all study sites; and the method of randomising participants and the allocation concealment. The World Health Organization Registry for clinical trials helped make the Indian registry more effective.

A review of the registry recommended that researchers who are wondering whether to register their research should resolve their concern by attempting to register in CTRI.

A 2019 evaluation reported that the registry improves the national quality of clinical trials in India but also that the registry itself would benefit from development to ensure more accurate data. One factor which introduced errors into the registry include that users register their own trials, sometimes with misunderstanding or errors in their submissions. Another factor is that the registration form itself lacks the precision which researchers would typically want, and for example, the "type of study" field is recording unclear responses.

== Research ==
A 2018 paper expressed that the CTRI had the benefit of preventing selective reporting of results and duplication of research. It also empowered patients and the public and informed ethics committees to and researchers about current and past trials. A 2022 audit of data fields in clinical registries found CTRI was one of the few clinical trial registries whose data fields pertaining to individual participant data availability was compliant with ICMJE guidelines.
