= Phytotherapy Research =

- Discipline: pharmacology, toxicology, natural products, phytotherapy, biochemistry
- Language: English
- Edited by: Angelo Izzo

Publication details
- History: 1987–present
- Publisher: John Wiley & Sons
- Frequency: Monthly
- Impact factor: 6.338 (2021)

Standard abbreviations
- ISO 4: Phytother. Res.

Indexing
- CODEN: PHYREH
- ISSN: 0951-418X (print); 1099-1573 (web)

Links
- Journal homepage

Phytotherapy Research is a monthly peer-reviewed scientific journal publishing original research papers, short communications, reviews, and letters on medicinal plant research. Key areas of interest are pharmacology, toxicology, and the clinical applications of herbs and natural products in medicine, from case histories to full clinical trials, including studies of herb-drug interactions and other aspects of the safety of herbal medicines. Papers concerned with the effects of common food ingredients and standardised plant extracts, including commercial products, are particularly relevant, as are mechanistic studies on isolated natural products.

The editor-in-chief is Angelo Izzo (University of Naples).

== Impact factor ==
According to the Journal Citation Reports, the journal has a 2020 impact factor of 5.882, ranking it 8th out of 63 journals in the category "Chemistry, medicinal" and 36th out of 276 journals in the category "Pharmacology & Pharmacy".
