= Drugs and Cosmetics Rules, 1945 =

Indian federal government rules

Drugs and Cosmetic Act, 1945
- Territorial extent: India
- Passed: 1940

Amended by
- 1955, 1964, 1972, 1982, 1986, 1995

Summary
- An act to regulate import, manufacture, distribution and sale of Drugs and Cosmetics.
- Status: In force

The Drugs and Cosmetics Rules, 1945 are the rules which the government of India established for the implementation of the Drugs and Cosmetics Act, 1940. These rules classify drugs under given schedules and present guidelines for the storage, sale, display and prescription of each schedule.

== Schedules ==
The Drugs and Cosmetics Rules, 1945 has provisions for classification of drugs under given schedules and there are guidelines for the storage, sale, display and prescription of each schedule. The Rule 67 details the conditions of licenses. The Rule 97 contains the labeling regulations.

The notable Schedules include:

- Schedule G: These drugs include hormonal medications (excluding sex hormone medications), antineoplastic drugs, anticonvulsants (e.g. 2,4-oxazolidinediones, ureides), hypoglycemic drugs (e.g. sulfonylureas, biguanides), antihistamines, etc. The drug label must display the text "Caution: It is dangerous to take this preparation except under medical supervision" prominently. Examples of substances under this schedule: All insulin preparations, testolactone, hydroxyurea, daunorubicin, metformin, diphenhydramine, carbutamide, primidone etc.
- Schedule H: Each drug's label must prominently display the symbol "Rx" and a red-boxed warning "Schedule H drug. Warning : "Not to be sold by Retail without the prescription of a Registered Medical Practitioner". It can only be supplied to licensed parties. It cannot be sold without a prescription and only the amount specified in the prescription should be sold. The time and date of prescription must be noted. Examples: androgenic, anabolic, oestrogenic and progestational substances; Alprazolam (Xanax), Hepatitis B vaccine, Ibuprofen, Vasopressin etc.
  - If a Schedule H drug also comes under the purview of Narcotic Drugs and Psychotropic Substances Act, 1985, the drug's label must prominently display the symbol "NRx" and a red-boxed warning "Schedule H drug. Warning : "Not to be sold by Retail without the prescription of a Registered Medical Practitioner".
- Schedule H1: Notified in 2013, this list includes third and fourth generation antibiotics, some psychotropic drugs and anti-TB drugs. A separate register is to be maintained to track supply of these drugs and labelling requirements are of the symbol "Rx" and the red boxed warning : “Schedule H1 Drug-Warning: It is dangerous to take this preparation except in accordance with the medical advice. -Not to be sold by retail without the prescription of a Registered Medical Practitioner.”
- Schedule J: Contains a list of various diseases and medical conditions that cannot be treated under any drug currently in market. No drug may legally claim to treat these diseases.
- Schedule X: Schedule X lists addictive drugs (e.g. narcotics, psychotropics) having medicinal uses that must be kept under lock and key. All the regulations of Schedule H apply. The retailer must keep a copy of the prescription for two years. Various licenses are required for possession and storage of these drugs, including a special licence from the local drug controller. Examples: morphine, secobarbital, glutethimide etc.

Other Schedules and their summary:

- Schedule A: Contains various forms and formats of letters for applications of licensing etc.
- Schedule B: Contains fees structure for government-run labs.
- Schedule C: Contains various biological products and their regulation. Examples: serums, adrenaline, vitamins etc.
- Schedule D: List of drugs exempted from the provision of import of drugs
- Schedule E: Contains various poisons and their regulation. Examples: Sarpa Visha (Snake venom), Parada (Mercury) etc.
- Schedule F: This contains regulations and standards for running a blood bank.
  - Schedule F-I: This contains regulations and standards for vaccines.
  - Schedule F-II: This contains regulations and standards for surgical dressing.
  - Schedule F-III: This contains regulations and standards for umbilical tapes.
- Schedule F-F: This contains regulations and standards for ophthalmic ointments and solutions.
- Schedule K: Drugs not meant for medicinal use, quinine and other antimalarial drugs, drugs supplied by government hospitals, registered medical practitioners, contraceptive drugs, and their corresponding regulation.
- Schedule M: Contains various regulations for manufacturing, premises, waste disposal and equipment.
- Schedule N: Contains various regulations and requirements for a pharmacy.
- Schedule O: Contains various regulations and requirements for disinfectant fluids.
- Schedule P: Contains regulations regarding life period and storage of various drugs.
  - Schedule P-I: Contains regulations regarding retail package size of various drugs.
- Schedule Q: Contains a list of permitted dyes and pigments in soap and cosmetics.
- Schedule R: Contains various regulations and requirements for condoms and other mechanical contraceptives.
- Schedule S: Lists various cosmetics and toiletries, and directs the manufacturers of cosmetics to conform to the latest Bureau of Indian Standards requirements.
- Schedule T: Contains various regulations and requirements for manufacture of Ayurvedic, Siddha and Unani drugs.
- Schedule U: Contains various regulations and requirements for record keeping.
- Schedule V: Contains standards for drug patents
- Schedule W: Lists generic drugs.
- Schedule Y: Contains requirement and guidelines for clinical trials.
- Schedule Z: Lists approved drugs for veterinary use.

== Proposed amendments ==
In September 2026, the Ministry of Health and Family Welfare issued a draft notification, Gazette Notification G.S.R. 791(E) dated 8 September 2026, proposing to make closed-circuit television (CCTV) surveillance mandatory at retail premises selling Schedule H, H1 and X drugs, with footage to be retained for at least three months. The Health Ministry said the proposal had been considered by the Drugs Consultative Committee and subsequently recommended for approval by the Drugs Technical Advisory Board. As of September 2026 the proposal remained a draft open for public comments and had not been notified into force.

== See also ==
- Drug policy of India
- Drugs and Cosmetics Act, 1940
- Drugs and Magic Remedies (Objectionable Advertisements) Act, 1954
