= Chief research officer =

Corporate title

The chief research officer (CRO), research officer, or research director is a job title commonly given to the most senior executive in an enterprise responsible for the research that supports enterprise goals. Generally, the CRO reports to the chief executive officer. In educational organizations, they report to the chancellor or president.
