= Grazia India =

Indian women's fashion magazine

Grazia

- Deepika Padukone on the April 2016 cover of Grazia
- Editor-in-chief: Priya Tanna
- Former editors: Nandini Bhalla
- Categories: Fashion
- Frequency: Monthly
- Circulation: 65,000
- Publisher: Rabindra Narayan
- First issue: 7 April 2008
- Company: PTC Network via G-Next Media Pvt Ltd
- Country: India
- Language: English
- Website: Grazia.co.in

Grazia India is the Indian edition of the Italian women's fashion and celebrity gossip magazine Grazia. It is the 10th international edition of Grazia. The monthly magazine covers fashion, health, and current events, and is targeted at affluent urban women.

== History and profile ==
The first issue of the Indian edition of Grazia was the April 2008 issue featuring Bipasha Basu on the cover. It was launched on 7 April 2008 by Worldwide Media (WWM). Grazia, owned by Arnoldo Mondadori Editore, is published under license in India by World Wide Media. Started in 2004, WWM was originally a joint venture between The Times Group and BBC Worldwide. It has been a wholly owned subsidiary of The Times Group since October 2011. The company also publishes Femina, Filmfare, Top Gear, GoodHomes Magazine, Lonely Planet magazine and Hello India, among others.

Nandini Bhalla is one of the former editors-in-chief of the magazine.
