= Drugs and Magic Remedies (Objectionable Advertisements) Act, 1954 =

Act of the Parliament of India

Parliament of India
- Long title: An Act to control the advertisement of drugs in certain cases, to prohibit the advertisement for certain purposes of remedies alleged to possess magic qualities and to provide for matters connected therewith.
- Citation: Act No. 21 of 1954
- Territorial extent: whole of India
- Passed by: Rajya Sabha
- Passed: 16 February 1954
- Passed by: Lok Sabha
- Passed: 1954
- Assented to by: President Rajendra Prasad
- Assented to: 30 April 1954
- Commenced: 1 April 1955

Legislative history

First chamber: Rajya Sabha
- Bill title: Drugs and Magic Remedies (Objectionable Advertisements) Bill, 1953
- Bill citation: Bill No. XXVII of 1953
- Introduced by: Rajkumari Amrit Kaur, Minister of Health
- Introduced: 2 December 1953
- Passed: 16 February 1954

Amended by
- Drugs and Magic Remedies (Objectionable Advertisements) Amendment Act, 1963 (42 of 1963)
- Status: In force

The Drugs and Magic Remedies (Objectionable Advertisements) Act, 1954, is an Act of the Parliament of India that controls the advertising of drugs in India. It prohibits advertisements of drugs and remedies that claim to have magical properties and makes doing so a cognizable offence.

== Overview ==
The act defines "magic remedy" as any talisman, mantra, amulet, or other object claimed to have miraculous powers to cure, diagnose, prevent, or mitigate a disease in humans or animals. It also includes such devices claimed to have power to influence structure or function of an organ in humans or animals.

The law prohibits the advertising of drugs and remedies for

- inducing miscarriage or preventing conception in women
- improving or maintaining the capacity for sexual pleasure
- correcting menstrual disorders
- curing, diagnosing, or preventing any disease or condition mentioned in an included schedule

The originally included schedule contained a list of 54 diseases and conditions:

1. Appendicitis
2. Arteriosclerosis
3. Blindness
4. Blood poisoning
5. Bright's disease
6. Cancer
7. Cataract
8. Deafness
9. Diabetes
10. Diseases and Disorders of brain
11. Diseases and Disorders of the optical system
12. Diseases and Disorders of the uterus
13. Disorders of menstrual flow
14. Disorders of the nervous system
15. Disorders of the prostatic gland
16. Dropsy
17. Epilepsy
18. Female diseases (in general)
19. Fevers (in general)
20. Fits
21. Form and structure of the female bust
22. Gall stones, kidney stones and bladder stones
23. Gangrene
24. Glaucoma
25. Goitre
26. Heart diseases
27. High/low blood pressure
28. Hydrocele
29. Hysteria
30. Infantile paralysis
31. Insanity
32. Leprosy
33. Leucoderma
34. Lockjaw
35. Locomotor ataxia
36. Lupus
37. Nervous debility
38. Obesity
39. Paralysis
40. Plague
41. Pleurisy
42. Pneumonia
43. Rheumatism
44. Ruptures
45. Sexual impotence
46. Smallpox
47. Stature of persons
48. Sterility in women
49. Trachoma
50. Tuberculosis
51. Tumours
52. Typhoid fever
53. Ulcers of the gastro-intestinal tract
54. Venereal diseases, including syphilis, gonorrhoea, soft chancre, venereal granuloma and lympho granuloma.

The act stated that the schedule may be changed later to include more diseases for which there are no accepted remedies or for which timely consultation with a registered medical practitioner (as defined under the Indian Medical Degrees Act, 1916 or Indian Medical Councils Act, 1956; includes other state laws too) is required. The act stated that the Central government must make these changes in consultation with the Drugs Technical Advisory Board and Ayurveda and Unani practitioners, if necessary.

The penalty carries a maximum sentence of 6 months imprisonment with or without fine on the first conviction. The term may be up to a year in case of any subsequent conviction. All company members will be deemed guilty if the convicted party is a company.

== Criticism and future amendments ==
The law is rarely enforced, and several such products are freely available to the public. It is considered severely outdated as 14 of the diseases on the list are now curable, and newer diseases like AIDS are not on the list. Some advertisements of these categories also appear on cable television channels with little repercussions. Proposed amendments to this law have also raised questions regarding the status of traditional medicine systems like Yoga and Ayurveda concerning modern medicine.

== See also ==
- Superstition in India
- Drugs and Cosmetics Act, 1940
- Schedule J of the Drugs and Cosmetics Rules, 1945
