= List of University of Illinois Chicago people =

This is a list of people associated with the University of Illinois Chicago in the United States.

Note that for earlier alumni, validating attendance is difficult. Before the creation of the Circle Campus, UIC was a two-year institution at Navy Pier. After two years, students continued at the Urbana-Champaign campus. During this period, the Chicago campus was not seen as distinct; thus, records about the first two years of a student's attendance often said nothing about whether those years were completed at Navy Pier. Consequently, some of the below alumni are credited in official biographies as graduating from the "University of Illinois." The alumni listed below for the Navy Pier period are those confirmed to have attended the Navy Pier campus.

== Notable faculty ==
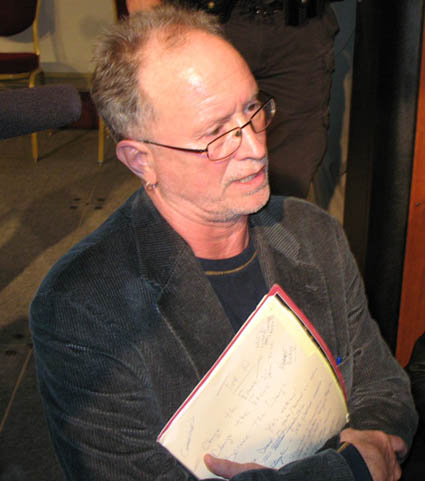
Bill Ayers

- Bill Ayers, retired professor of education; 1960s-era political activist; former member of the domestic terrorism organization Weather Underground; author of a number of books on the teaching profession; active in progressive campaigns for school reform
- Cynthia Barnes-Boyd, director of the Office of Community Engagement and Neighborhood Health Partnerships, executive director of the University of Illinois Mile Square Health Center. Clinical associate professor of community health at the UIC College of Nursing, and clinical associate professor of community health sciences at the UIC School of Public Health.
- Ana Bedran-Russo, associate dean for research, distinguished professor, and head of the department of oral biology; active in field of dental biomaterials.
- Daniel J. Bernstein, professor, department of computer science; author of qmail and djbdns; multiple NSF grant winner and Sloan Foundation fellow; distinguished for his work in the fields of cryptography and computer security
- Alexander Yarin, Soviet-Israeli-American applied physicist and engineer, from 2006 and currently distinguished professor. His main contributions are in the field of hydrodynamics, rheology, polymer science, and nanotechnology.
- Vikas Berry, professor and department head of chemical engineering at UIC; Best known for his research in the area of bionanotechnology, graphene and 2D Materials.
- William T. Bielby, sociologist, professor of sociology at UIC, President of the American Sociological Association from 2002–2003
- Jerry Bona, mathematician, professor at UIC math department
- Robert Bruegmann, professor of art history; specialist on the Chicago school of architecture; best known for his research on the architectural firm of Holabird & Root; commentator on urban sprawl
- Juan Carlos Campuzano, Distinguished Professor of Physics, Argonne Distinguished Fellow
- Ananda Chakrabarty, Distinguished professor of microbiology; created the oil-eating bacterium used during the Gulf War; special adviser to the US government and United Nations
- Marc Culler, mathematician working in geometric group theory and low-dimensional topology; known for work on the cyclic surgery theorem, Culler–Vogtmann Outer space, and the A-polynomial of a knot
- John D'Emilio, professor, department of gender and women's studies, department of history; leading scholar of gay and lesbian history; D'Emilio's work was cited by Supreme Court Justice Anthony Kennedy in his 2003 majority opinion when the court struck down a Texas law that criminalized sodomy
- Luisa DiPietro, PhD and DDS (UIC), Professor of Periodontics at the UIC College of Dentistry, director of the Center for Wound Repair and Tissue Regeneration
- Peter Doran, PhD, Professor of Earth and Environmental Sciences who specializes in polar regions, especially Antarctic climate and ecosystems; lead author of a research paper about Antarctic temperatures published in the journal Nature in January 2002
- Roberta M. Feldman, professor emerita (Architecture)
- Stanley Fish, Dean Emeritus of College of Liberal Arts and Sciences; has published many articles and books; renowned scholar on Milton; a sometimes controversial figure in academia
- Anne George, Brodie Tooth Development Genetics Research Professor, department of Oral Biology; substantial research on DMP1
- Gerald Graff, professor, department of English; respected literary critic, particularly on the subject of pedagogy
- Stedman Graham, specializes in the field of Management; public speaker on leadership and motivation; owner of successful consulting company; significant other of Oprah Winfrey
- Susanna Grannis, founding dean of the UIC Honors College
- Paul J. Griffiths, Arthur J. Schmitt Professor of Catholic Studies and Chair, department of classics and Mediterranean studies; a leading scholar in the fields of religious and Catholic studies, with specialization in Augustine, Buddhist thought, and religious diversity
- Peter Bacon Hales, former chair and professor of art history, photographer, and musician; specializes in the study of American spaces and landscapes, the history of photography, and contemporary art
- Robert L. Hall, late anthropologist
- Robert Hess (1938-1994), President of Brooklyn College
- Hannah Higgins, professor of art history; wrote the definitive history of the Fluxus movement, and author of The Grid Book, an interdisciplinary history of the grid's influence on Western culture
- Doug Ischar, Associate Professor Of Photography known for his fine art addressing stereotypes of masculinity and male behavior
- Louis Kauffman, professor of mathematics; known for the introduction and development of the bracket polynomial and Kauffman polynomial in knot theory; founding editor and a managing editor of the Journal of Knot Theory and its Ramifications, and editor of the World Scientific Book Series On Knots and Everything; writes the "Virtual Logic" column for the journal Cybernetics and Human Knowing; president of the American Society for Cybernetics (2007); 1993 recipient of the Warren McCulloch award of the American Society for Cybernetics
- Jim Knoedel, Head Men's and Women's Cross Country and Track Coach
- Tymoteusz Karpowicz, Polish poet and playwright who served as Professor of Polish Literature at the University of Illinois in Chicago from 1978-1992
- Jimenez Lai, architect, comic book artist
- Deirdre McCloskey, distinguished professor of liberal arts and sciences; known for analysis of economic rhetoric and critique of the role of statistical significance in economics
- Warren Sturgis McCulloch, professor of psychiatry, and contributor to cybernetics movement
- Stephen Melamed, UIC industrial design professor
- Walter Benn Michaels, professor and chair, department of English; respected literary critic, particularly for his work on identity studies and American culture; known for the article "Against Theory", which appeared in Critical Inquiry
- Peter Nelson, professor, director of the Artificial Intelligence laboratory, Dean of the University of Illinois Chicago College of Engineering
- S. Jay Olshansky, professor of epidemiology, UIC School of Public Health; biodemographer known for his research on the upper limits to human aging and longevity and his efforts to inform the public about products that claim to reverse or stop the aging process; lead author of The Quest for Immortality: Science at the Frontiers of Aging; recipient of two Independent Science Awards from the National Institute on Aging; Fulbright Senior Specialist
- Dan Peterman, professor of art and art history, distinguished environmental artist.
- Robert M. Pirsig, author of Zen and the Art of Motorcycle Maintenance.
- Anna C. Roosevelt, professor of anthropology, archaeologist and 1988 MacArthur Foundation Fellow
- Jennifer Reeder, associate professor of moving image
- Sally Sedgwick, distinguished professor of philosophy
- Susan Sensemann, professor emerita, school of art and design, former director of graduate studies, acting director and director of undergraduate studies, distinguished artist
- Bhama Srinivasan, mathematician known for her work in the representation theory of finite groups, professor emerita of the department of math statistics and computer science
- Deborah Stratman, professor of art and art history, experimental film maker
- Richard Thieme, ex-priest, technology commentator
- Michael Trenary, professor of chemistry
- Luís Alberto Urrea, poet, novelist, essayist, professor of English
- Anne Winters, poet, professor of English
- Xiaofeng Zhou, assistant professor, Center for Molecular Biology of Oral Diseases; internationally known oral cancer researcher

== Alumni ==
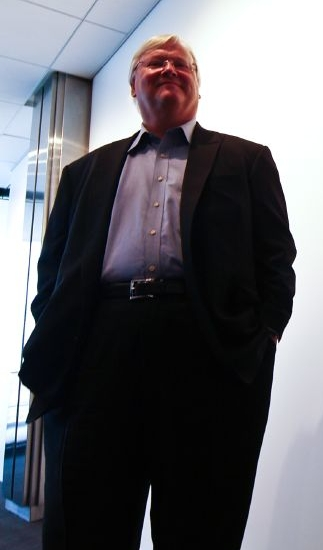
Adrian D. Smith

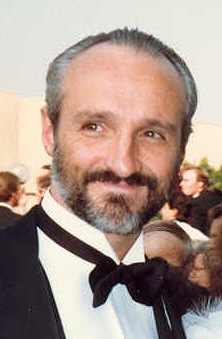
Michael Gross

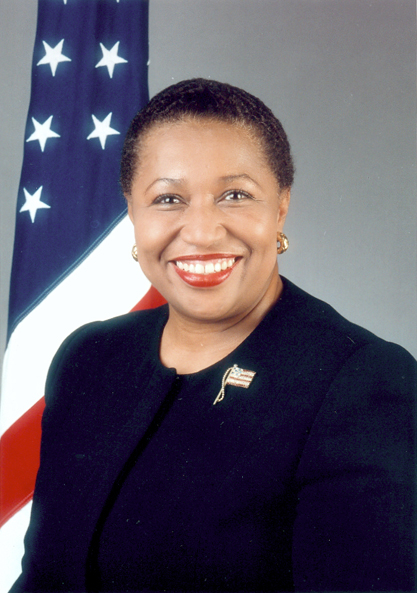
Carol Moseley Braun

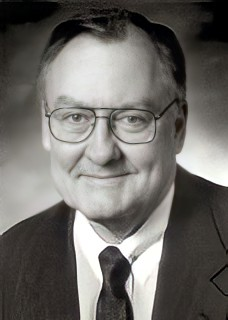
James R. Thompson

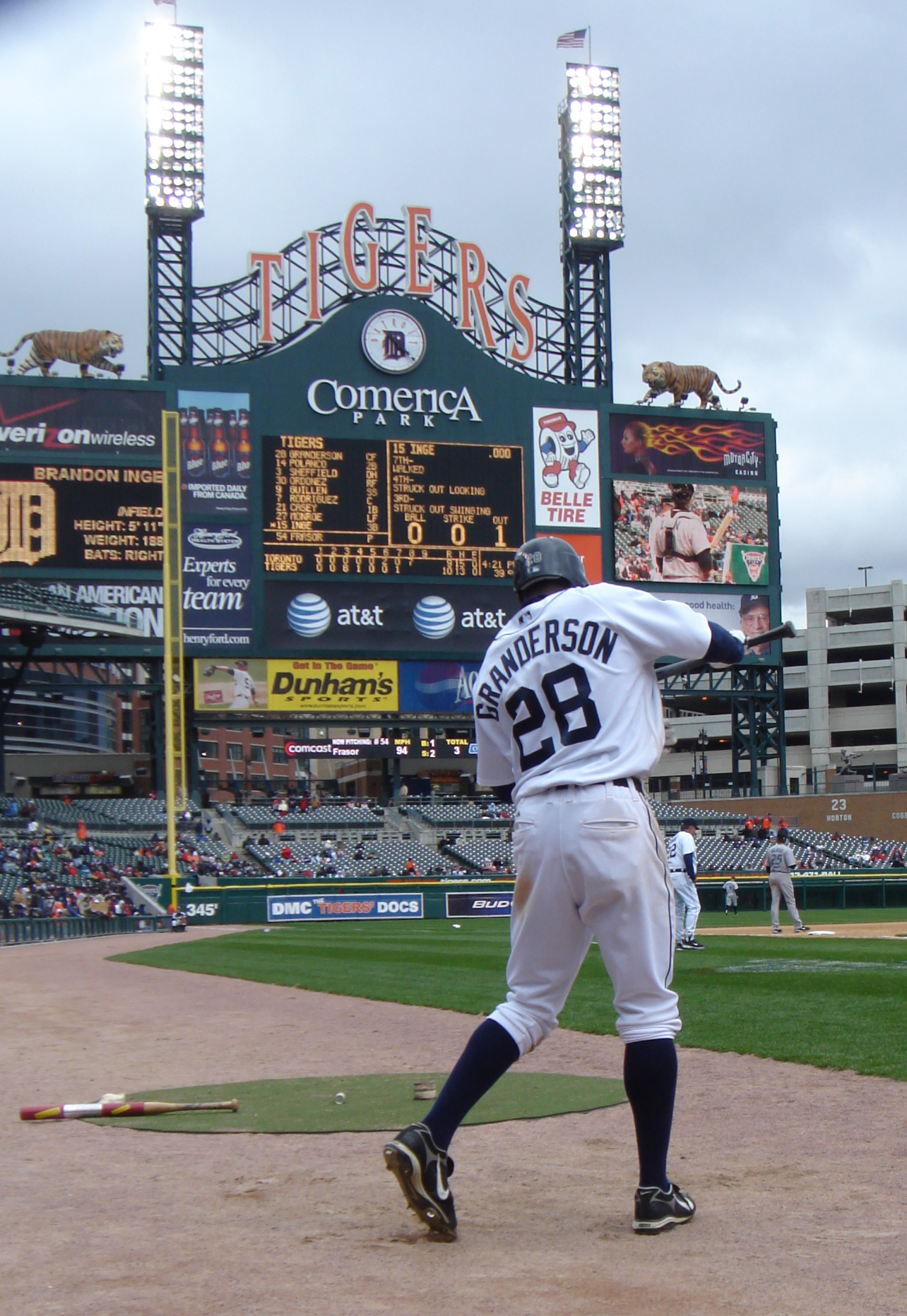
Curtis Granderson

=== Academia ===
- Anne Allison, professor of cultural anthropology at Duke University, specializing in contemporary Japanese society
- Nancy Cartwright, PhD, professor of philosophy at the London School of Economics and the University of California at San Diego, and a recipient of the MacArthur Fellowship
- Michele Dauber, 1993, law professor at the Stanford Law School.
- William A. Dembski, BA 1981, MS 1983, mathematician, philosopher, theologian, author, and professor of philosophy at Southwestern Baptist Theological Seminary in Fort Worth, Texas
- Kevin Desouza, associate dean for research, College of Public Programs, Arizona State University; formerly at University of Washington, London School of Economics, Virginia Tech, and the University of Witwatersrand; author of nine books and over 100 articles on information management, knowledge and innovation management, and security; Fellow, Royal Society of the Arts
- Lindsay Grace, C. Michael Armstrong professor of Fine Arts at Miami University, focusing on game design theory and writing
- Robert L. Hall, late professor of anthropology emeritus at UICC, specialized in the ethnohistory, ethnology, and archaeology of the Great Plains and Midwestern United States, the beliefs, rituals, and symbolisms of North American native Americans
- Richard I. Morimoto, BS, Bill and Gayle Cook Professor of Biology, professor of biochemistry, molecular biology and cell biology, and director of the Rice Institute for Biomedical Research at Northwestern University
- Michael E. Newcomb, BA 2004, clinical psychologist
- Kali Nikitas, BFA, chair of the communication arts department at Otis College of Art and Design
- Richard Schneirov, 1971, professor of history, noted labor historian at Indiana State University, Fulbright Scholar
- Kristin Umland, PhD 1996, mathematician and mathematics educator

=== Architecture and design ===
- George J. Efstathiou, 1974, architect and managing partner of Skidmore, Owings and Merrill, LLP
- Dan Meis, 1985, award-winning architect of ballparks, arenas and stadiums (Miller Park, Paul Brown Stadium, Safeco Field, Saitama Super Arena, Crypto.com Arena, and Sports City Stadium)
- Adrian D. Smith, 1969, former longtime partner at Skidmore, Owings and Merrill LLP, before starting his own firm; designed the Trump International Hotel and Tower (Chicago), Burj Khalifa and Jin Mao Tower
- Michael G. Turnbull, 1973, assistant Architect of the Capitol in Washington, D.C., previously head of the Department of Design and Construction at the Art Institute of Chicago

=== Arts and entertainment ===
- Mark Aguhar, MFA, multidisciplinary fine artist known for work addressing gender and non-conformity
- Kelly Cheung, Miss Chinese International Pageant 2012(also TV hostess and actress later on)
- Santiago Durango, attorney and guitarist remembered for his work with the 1980s punk rock groups, Naked Raygun and Big Black
- Tom Friedman, MFA in sculpture in 1990
- Janina Gavankar, actress and recording artist
- Michael Gross (1970), movie and television actor best known for his role as Steven Keaton on the 1980s NBC sitcom Family Ties
- Angelina Gualdoni, (MFA 2000), painter
- Justin Hartley, actor best known for his roles on the NBC daytime soap opera Passions, and the WB/CW Superman-inspired series, Smallville
- Megan Hauserman (2005) reality TV personality and model
- Patty Hou, Taiwanese news anchor and actress
- Richard Hunt (1965), sculptor known for large public works
- Al Jourgensen, frontman of Ministry; attended the Circle Campus c. 1979
- Mike Nawrocki (BS 1992), co-creator, writer and director of the animated series VeggieTales; voice of Larry the Cucumber
- Lucas Neff (BFA 2008), actor best known for his starring role as James "Jimmy" Chance in Fox's sitcom Raising Hope
- Christopher Sperandio, (MFA 1991), artist known for his collaborative work with British artist Simon Grennan
- Kenny Techstepper (2006), co-host and technical producer for Mancow's Morning Madhouse, a nationally syndicated talk radio show
- Sheryl Underwood, comedian, co-host of CBS show The Talk
- Azhar Usman, comedian, lecturer, community activist and lawyer
- Alexa Viscius (BFA), multi-disciplinary artist and bassist for Bnny
- Mary-Scott Welch, writer and magazine editor

=== Business ===
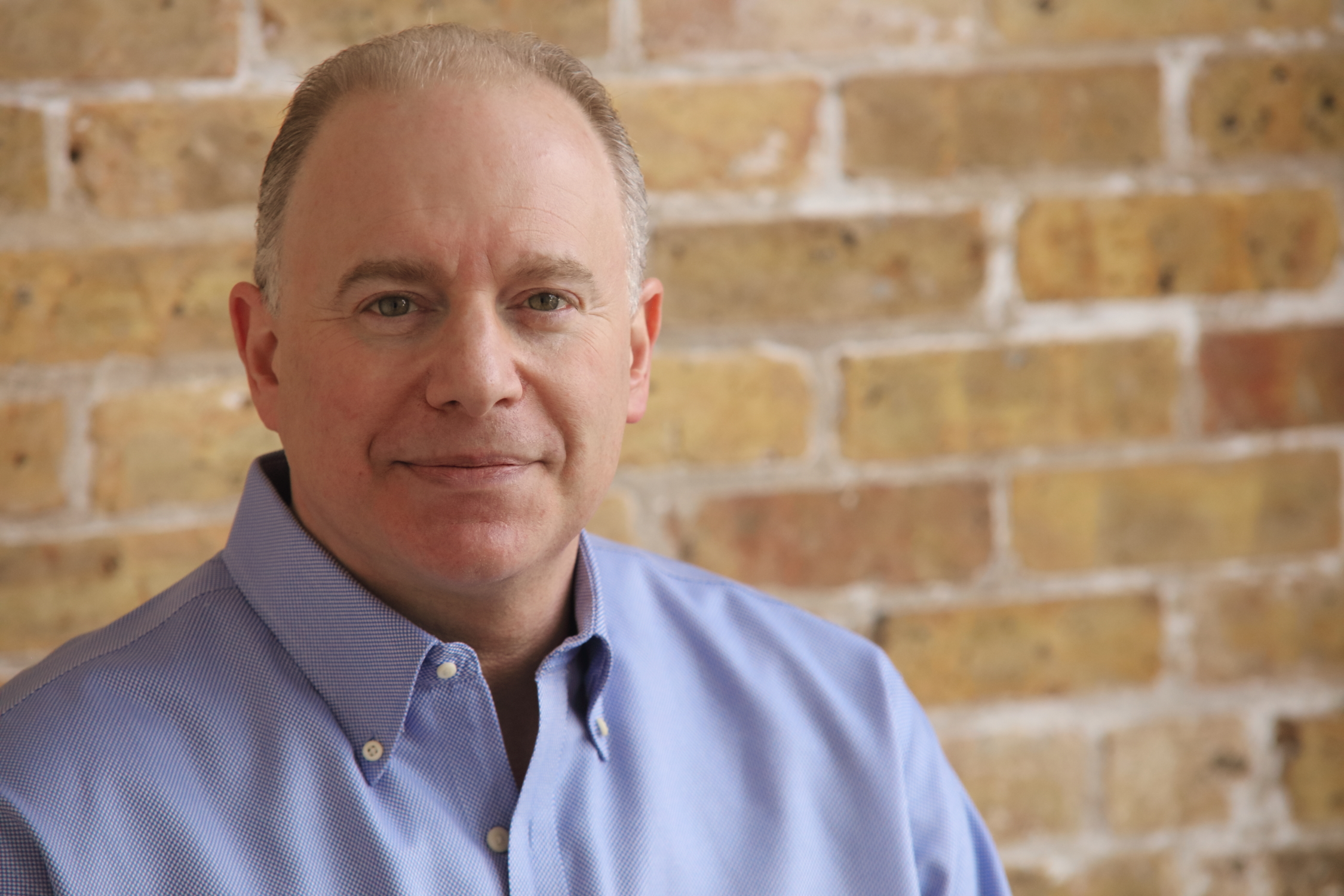
Cary Kochman

- Anuradha Acharya, founder and chief executive officer, Ocimum Bio Solutions
- Linda Bubon, Co-founder of Women & Children First bookstore
- Cary Kochman, Co-Head of Global M & A Group at Citi
- Marc J. Lane, 1967, business and tax attorney, entrepreneur and founder of the Marc J. Lane Wealth Group
- Robert Anthony Mariano, BS 1971, chairman, Chief Executive Officer and President, Roundy's, Inc.
- Leo Melamed, attended in 1940s, former chairman, Chicago Mercantile Exchange (CME); current board member, CME Group; chairman, CME Group Foundation
- Tony Podesta, class of '67, prominent Washington lobbyist, founder of the Podesta Group
- Mary Dillon- current Chief Executive Office, Ulta Beauty and former Chief Executive Office, US Cellular
- Nirmalya Kumar - currently teaching at Singapore Management University and Chief Strategist, Tata Group

=== Government, politics, and service ===
- Carol Moseley Braun, 1969, politician and lawyer and the first African-American woman elected to the US Senate
- John H. Cox, lawyer, accountant, businessman, broadcaster, and aspiring politician
- Sharon Denise Dixon, 1985, former Democratic alderman representing the 24th Ward on the Chicago City Council
- Luz Maria Frias, Deputy Attorney General of Minnesota and president-CEO of YWCA Minnesota
- Radovan Jelasic, former Governor of the National Bank of Serbia
- Darin LaHood, JD, U.S. Congressman from Illinois
- Daniel La Spata, alderperson of the 1st ward of the City of Chicago
- Raymond Lopez, alderperson of the 15th ward of the City of Chicago
- Freddrenna Lyle, former alderman of the 6th ward of the City of Chicago
- Leni Manaa-Hoppenworth, alderperson of the 48th ward of the City of Chicago
- Iris Martinez, Democratic member of the Illinois Senate, representing the 20th district
- Jim McDermott, MD 1963, Democratic US Representative for Washington's 7th congressional district (1989–2017).
- Michael Noland, BA 1991, MBA 2001, Democratic member of the Illinois Senate, representing the 22nd District
- Milton Patterson, MPA, former two-term Democratic member of the Illinois House of Representatives, representing the 32nd District
- Tony Peraica 1980, Cook County Commissioner
- Louanner Peters, MA 1973, former deputy governor of Illinois
- Bobby Rush, 1994, US Congressman and civil rights leader
- Byron Sigcho-Lopez, alderperson of the 25th ward of the City of Chicago
- Debra Silverstein, alderperson of the 50th ward of the City of Chicago
- James R. Thompson (Navy Pier), former governor of Illinois and member of the 9/11 Commission

=== Journalism, literature and writing ===
- Alaa Al Aswany, MDent, writer and political activist
- Charles Blackstone, novelist, editor and winner of the Barker Award for Fiction in 2001
- Patricia Brieschke, PhD 1983, short story writer
- John Chancellor (Navy Pier), 1950, anchor for NBC Nightly News from 1970 to 1982
- Michael Collins, PhD 1997, Irish novelist and international ultra-distance runner
- Tina De Rosa (master's degree in English), author of Paper Fish
- M. Miriam Herrera, MA 1981, author and poet
- Ma. Luisa Aguilar Igloria, PhD 1995, poet and author of various award-winning collections
- Stuart Kaminsky, 1957, author of over 50 award-winning novels; mostly mystery genre
- Rich King, weekend sports anchor and sports reporter for WGN-TV in Chicago
- Jack Mabley, 1938, columnist for several Chicago newspapers, including the Chicago Tribune
- Gerald Nicosia, BA 1971, MA 1973., freelance journalist, interviewer, and literary critic
- Frederick Ramsay, PhD 1962, medical school academic and administrator, mystery writer.
- Bernard Shaw, 1968, anchor for CNN from 1980 to his retirement in 2001
- Shel Silverstein, attended the University of Illinois at Navy Pier for a year
- Corrina Wycoff, MA, writer, best known for her short story collection O Street

=== Medicine, Nursing, and dentistry ===
- Cynthia Barnes-Boyd, BS, MS, PhD, director of the Office of Community Engagement and Neighborhood Health Partnerships, executive director of the University of Illinois Mile Square Health Center. Clinical associate professor of community health at the UIC College of Nursing, and clinical associate professor of community health sciences at the UIC School of Public Health.
- Stanley J. Korsmeyer (1951–2005), oncologist who helped develop the concepts of the role of programmed cell death in carcinogenesis
- Harry Watson Martin (1889–1951), medical director of 20th Century Fox Studios and third husband of Louella Parsons
- Charles Moertel MD 1953, (1927–1994), cancer researcher at the Mayo Clinic
- Mohan D. Nair, Indian pharmaceutical scientist and author
- David Sackett (1934–2015), American-Canadian medical doctor, widely regarded as the "father of evidence-based medicine"
- Sheila Tlou 1990, Botswana specialist in HIV/AIDS and women's health, nursing educator and former Minister of Health

=== Military ===
- William J. Walker, BA 1980, major general, United States Army, commanding general, District of Columbia National Guard, former director, Office of Diversion and Chemical Control, Drug Enforcement Administration

=== Non-profit organizations ===
- Barbara A. Schaal, 1969, evolutionary biologist, professor at Washington University in St. Louis and vice president of the National Academy of Sciences

=== Sports ===
- Jeff Bzdelik, assistant coach for NBA's Memphis Grizzlies, former head coach of the Denver Nuggets and college basketball's Wake Forest Demon Deacons and Colorado Buffaloes
- Jay DeMerit, former professional soccer player formerly of Watford F.C. of the English Football League Championship and Vancouver Whitecaps FC of Major League Soccer, and longtime member of the US National Team
- Sherell Ford, former NBA player and 1995 first-round draft pick of the Seattle SuperSonics
- Curtis Granderson, former Major League Baseball center fielder for the New York Mets and finalist for the 2011 American League MVP
- Baggio Husidić, former professional soccer player of the Chicago Fire of Major League Soccer, currently with Hammarby IF in the Swedish Superettan
- Joanne McCarthy, 1998, UIC career scoring and assists recordholder and former professional women's basketball player.
- Tai Odiase, 2018, Nigerian American and naturalized Puerto Rican player for Hapoel Tel Aviv of the Israeli Israeli Basketball Premier League
- Dylan Quercia, chess Candidate Master, winner of the U2100 section at the 2016 U.S. Open Chess Championship
- Monroe Saffold Jr., former bodybuilder, first place Masters Mr. America AAU, tall division 1990
- Chuck Ulrich, former NFL defensive tackle
- Cesar Zambrano, former UIC and professional soccer player
