= Osteocyte =

Cell type

- Transverse section of a bone

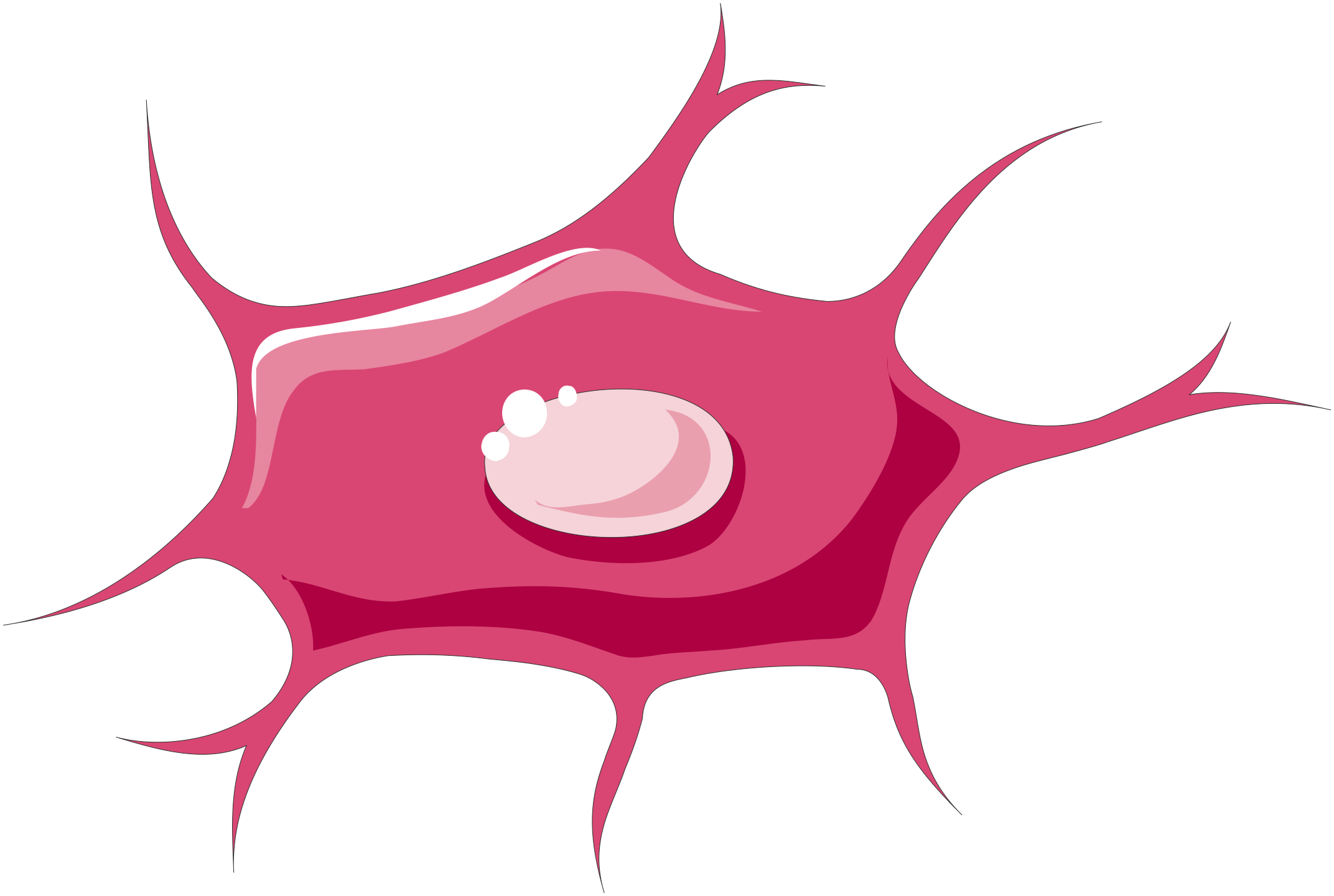
- Illustration showing a single osteocyte

Details
- Location: Bone

Identifiers
- Latin: Osteocytus
- MeSH: D010011
- TH: H2.00.03.7.00003
- FMA: 66779

An osteocyte, an oblate-shaped type of bone cell with dendritic processes, is the most commonly found cell in mature bone. It can live as long as the organism itself. The adult human body has about 42 billion of them. Osteocytes do not divide and have an average half life of 25 years. They are derived from osteoprogenitor cells, some of which differentiate into active osteoblasts (which may further differentiate to osteocytes). Osteoblasts/osteocytes develop in mesenchyme.

In mature bones, osteocytes and their processes reside inside spaces called lacunae (Latin for a pit) and canaliculi, respectively. Osteocytes are simply osteoblasts trapped in the matrix that they secrete. They are networked to each other via long cytoplasmic extensions that occupy tiny canals called canaliculi, which are used for exchange of nutrients and waste through gap junctions.

Although osteocytes have reduced synthetic activity and (like osteoblasts) are not capable of mitotic division, they are actively involved in the routine turnover of bony matrix, through various mechanosensory mechanisms. They destroy bone through a rapid, transient (relative to osteoclasts) mechanism called osteocytic osteolysis. Hydroxyapatite, calcium carbonate and calcium phosphate is deposited around the cell.

== Structure ==
Osteocytes have a stellate shape, approximately 7 micrometers deep and wide by 15 micrometers in length. The cell body varies in size from 5–20 micrometers in diameter and contain 40–60 cell processes per cell, with a cell to cell distance between 20–30 micrometers. A mature osteocyte contains a single nucleus that is located toward the vascular side and has one or two nucleoli and a membrane. The cell also exhibits a reduced size endoplasmic reticulum, Golgi apparatus and mitochondria, and cell processes that radiate largely towards the bone surfaces in circumferential lamellae, or towards a haversian canal and outer cement line typical of osteons in concentric lamellar bone. Osteocytes form an extensive lacunocanalicular network within the mineralized collagen type I matrix, with cell bodies residing within lacunae, and cell/dendritic processes within channels called canaliculi.

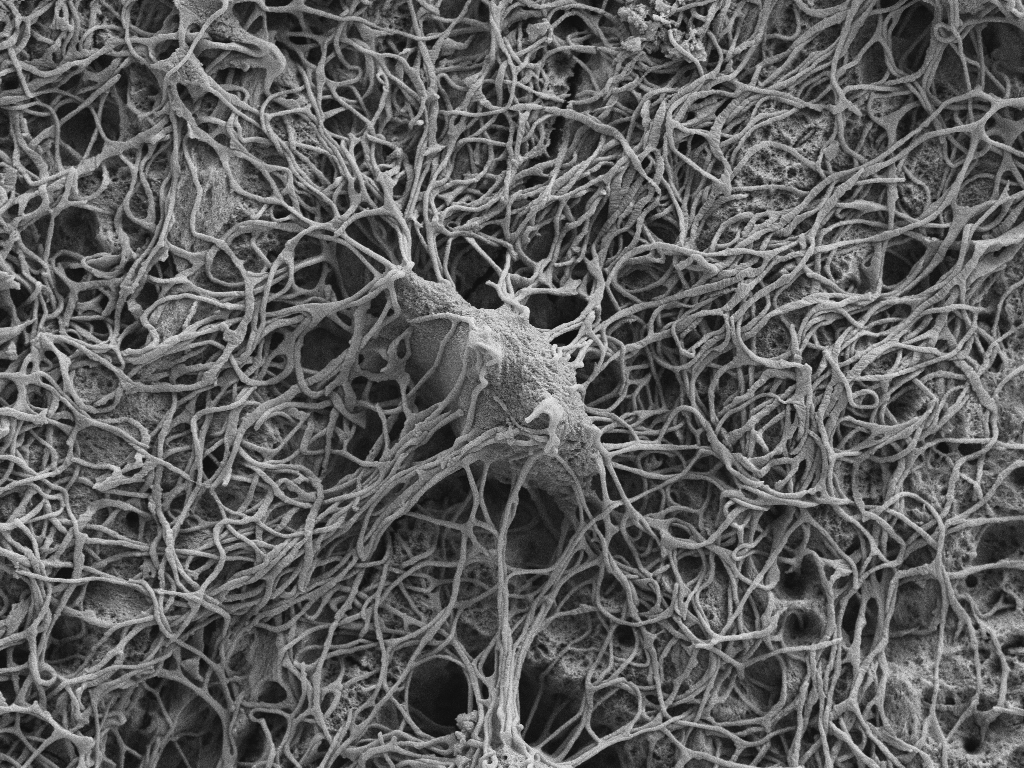
An osteocyte in rat bone exposed by resin cast etching

== Development ==
The fossil record shows that osteocytes were present in bones of jawless fish 400 to 250 million years ago. Osteocyte size has been shown to covary with genome size; and this relationship has been used in paleogenomic research.

During bone formation, an osteoblast is left behind and buried in the bone matrix as an "osteoid osteocyte", which maintains contact with other osteoblasts through extended cellular processes. Although recently it was shown that vascular smooth muscle cells drive osteocyte differentiation, most aspects of osteocytogenesis remain largely unknown. Various molecules have been reported to be involved. Examples include matrix metalloproteinases (MMPs), dentin matrix protein 1 (DMP-1), osteoblast/osteocyte factor 45 (OF45), Klotho, TGF-beta inducible factor (TIEG), lysophosphatidic acid (LPA), E11 antigen, and oxygen. 10–20% of osteoblasts differentiate into osteocytes. Those osteoblasts on the bone surface that are destined for burial as osteocytes slow down matrix production, and are buried by neighboring osteoblasts that continue to produce matrix actively.

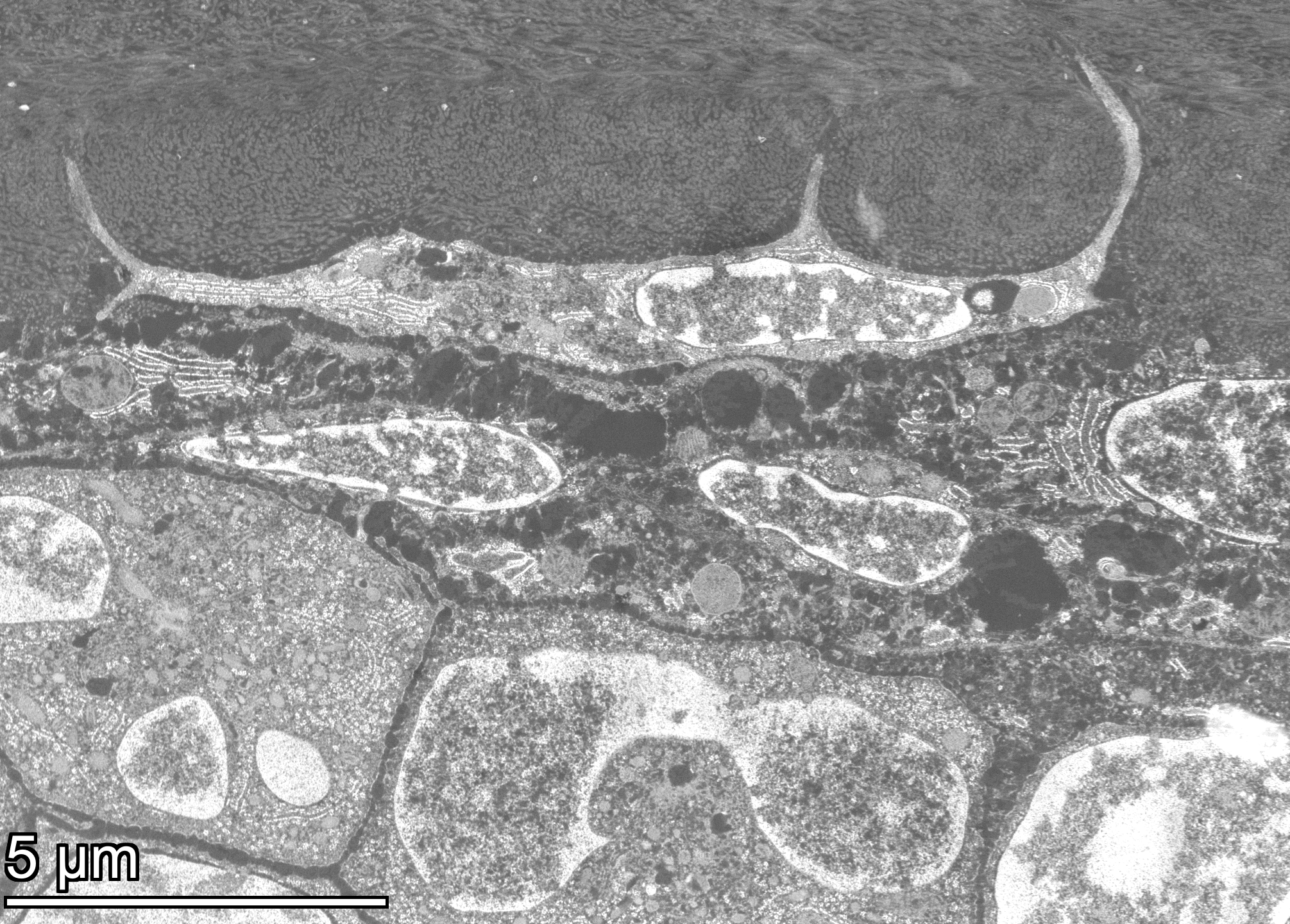
HAADF-STEM electron image of a maturing osteocyte (preosteocyte or osteoid osteocyte) at the bone surface, appearing directly above osteoblast-like precursor cells (decalcified matrix). Note the elongated cell processes that are surrounded by the collagen type I matrix and already crossing lamellar boundaries as collagen (and eventually mineral) continues to entomb the cell.

Palumbo et al. (1990) distinguish three cell types from osteoblast to mature osteocyte: type I preosteocyte (osteoblastic osteocyte), type II preosteocyte (osteoid osteocyte), and type III preosteocyte (partially surrounded by mineral matrix). The embedded "osteoid-osteocyte" must do two functions simultaneously: regulate mineralization and form connective dendritic processes, which requires cleavage of collagen and other matrix molecules. The transformation from motile osteoblast to entrapped osteocyte takes about three days, and during this time, the cell produces a volume of extracellular matrix three times its own cellular volume, which results in 70% volume reduction in the mature osteocyte cell body compared to the original osteoblast volume. The cell undergoes a dramatic transformation from a polygonal shape to a cell that extends dendrites toward the mineralizing front, followed by dendrites that extend to either the vascular space or bone surface. As the osteoblast transitions to an osteocyte, alkaline phosphatase is reduced, and casein kinase II is elevated, as is osteocalcin.

Osteocytes appear to be enriched in proteins that are resistant to hypoxia, which appears to be due to their embedded location and restricted oxygen supply. Oxygen tension may regulate the differentiation of osteoblasts into osteocytes, and osteocyte hypoxia may play a role in disuse-mediated bone resorption.

== Function ==
Although osteocytes are relatively inert cells, they are capable of molecular synthesis and modification, as well as transmission of signals over long distances, in a way similar to the nervous system. They are the most common cell type in bone (31,900 per cubic millimeter in bovine bone to 93,200 per cubic millimeter in rat bone). Most of the receptor activities that play an important role in bone function are present in the mature osteocyte.

Osteocytes are an important regulator of bone mass. Osteocytes contain glutamate transporters that produce nerve growth factors after bone fracture, evidence of a sensing and information transfer system. When osteocytes were experimentally destroyed, the bones showed a significant increase in bone resorption, decreased bone formation, trabecular bone loss, and loss of response to unloading.

Osteocytes are mechanosensor cells that control the activity of osteoblasts and osteoclasts within a basic multicellular unit (BMU), a temporary anatomic structure where bone remodeling occurs. Osteocytes generate an inhibitory signal that is passed through their cell processes to osteoblasts for recruitment to enable bone formation.

Osteocytes are also a key endocrine regulator in the metabolism of minerals such as phosphates. Osteocyte-specific proteins such as sclerostin have been shown to function in mineral metabolism, as well as other molecules such as PHEX, DMP-1, MEPE, and FGF-23, which are highly expressed by osteocytes and regulate phosphate and biomineralization. Osteocyte regulation can be linked to disease. For example, Lynda Bonewald determined that osteocytes make FGF23, which travels through the bloodstream to trigger the release of phosphorus by the kidneys. Without enough phosphorus bones and teeth soften, and muscles become weak, as in X-linked hypophosphatemia.

=== Sclerostin ===
Osteocytes synthesize sclerostin, a secreted protein that inhibits bone formation by binding to LRP5/LRP6 coreceptors and blunting Wnt signaling. Sclerostin, the product of the SOST gene, is the first mediator of communication between osteocytes, bone forming osteoblasts and bone resorbing osteoclasts, critical for bone remodeling. Only osteocytes express sclerostin, which acts in a paracrine fashion to inhibit bone formation. Sclerostin is inhibited by parathyroid hormone (PTH) and mechanical loading. Sclerostin antagonizes the activity of BMP (bone morphogenetic protein), a cytokine that induces bone and cartilage formation.

== Pathophysiology ==
Osteonecrosis refers to the classic pattern of cell death and complex osteogenesis and bone resorption processes. Osteocyte necrosis (ON) initiates with hematopoietic and adipocytic cellular necrosis along with interstitial marrow edema. ON happens after about 2 to 3 hours of anoxia; histological signs of osteocytic necrosis do not display until about 24 to 72 hours after hypoxia. ON is first characterized by pyknosis of nuclei, followed by hollow osteocyte lacunae. Capillary revascularization and reactive hyperemia slightly take place at the periphery of the necrosis site, followed by a repair process combining both bone resorption and production that incompletely changes dead with living bone. Nouveau bone overlays onto dead trabeculae along with fragmentary resorption of dead bone. Bone resorption outperforms formation resulting in a net removal of bone, deformed structural integrity of the subchondral trabeculae, joint incongruity, and subchondral fracture.

== Clinical significance ==
Clinically important research of gel based in vitro 3D model for the osteocytic potentiality of human CD34+ stem cells has been described. The results confirm that the human CD34+ stem cells possess unique osteogenic differentiation potential and can be used in the early regeneration of injured bone. Osteocytes die as a consequence of senescence, degeneration/necrosis, apoptosis (programmed cell death), and/or osteoclastic engulfment. The percentage of dead osteocytes in bone increases with age from less than 1% at birth to 75% after age 80. Osteocyte apoptosis is thought to be related to decreased mechanotransduction, which possibly leads to the development of osteoporosis. Apoptotic osteocytes release apoptotic bodies expressing RANKL to recruit osteoclasts.

Mechanical loading increases osteocyte viability in vitro, and contributes to solute transport through the lacuno-canalicular system in bone, which enhances oxygen and nutrient exchange and diffusion to osteocytes. Skeletal unloading has been shown to induce osteocyte hypoxia in vivo, this is when osteocytes undergo apoptosis and recruit osteoclasts to resorb bone. Microdamage in bone occurs as the result of repetitive events of cycling loading, and appears to be associated with osteocyte death by apoptosis, which appear to secrete a signal to target osteoclasts to perform remodeling at a damaged site. Under normal conditions, osteocytes express high amounts of TGF-β and thus repress bone resorption, but when bone grows old, the expression levels of TGF-β decrease, and the expression of osteoclast-stimulatory factors, such as RANKL and M-CSF increases, bone resorption is then enhanced, leading to net bone loss.

Mechanical stimulation of osteocytes results in opening of hemichannels to release PGE2 and ATP, among other biochemical signaling molecules, which play a crucial role in maintaining the balance between bone formation and resorption. Osteocyte cell death can occur in association with pathologic conditions such as osteoporosis and osteoarthritis, which leads to increased skeletal fragility, linked to the loss of ability to sense microdamage and/or signal repair. Oxygen deprivation that occurs as the result of immobilization (bed rest), glucocorticoid treatment, and withdrawal of oxygen have all been shown to promote osteocyte apoptosis. It is now recognized that osteocytes respond in a variety of ways to the presence of implant biomaterials.

== See also ==
- List of human cell types derived from the germ layers
- List of distinct cell types in the adult human body
