= Graphene spray gun =

Kinetic spray system

Graphene spray guns are a kinetic spray system that deposits, through supersonic acceleration, a one atom thick sheet of pure carbon named graphene by means of a de Laval nozzle, which is a pinched tube with an hourglass type shape. The system deposits graphene flakes and a hexagonal graphene lattice is created upon impact of the desired surface. The graphene spray gun would be utilized onto large-scale applications such as circuits, radio transmitters, and optical electronics due to its transparency and its high electrical conductivity. The supersonic spray system was first developed in May 2014 by University of Illinois professor Alexander Yarin, and Korea University professor Sam Yoon. Yarin went to Yoon when he learned about his work regarding kinetic spray deposition systems. Yarin believed that graphene could be applied to the system in order to create a layer of the material. After conducting experiments with the newly created system, they concluded that the graphene spray system was a success. The spray gun is still in its early stages of development, but is considered by many scientists and researchers to be the solution of various predicaments that occur when applying graphene onto large-scale products. The most common problem that would transpire within the other methods is that the layer would be uneven and coated by aggregations. The energy delivered by the supersonic spraying stretches the graphene evenly upon impact, and is the main reason for the spray system's lack of defects that are common within other graphene deposition methods.

== Method ==
Reduced graphene oxide, an aqueous fluid supplied with low-quality graphene flakes, is inserted into the de Laval nozzle throat. These precursor molecules are then converted into fine particles during its exposure to supersonic-speed gas stream. The reduced graphene oxide molecules (r-GO's) are then transformed into tiny droplets in the air subsequent to its deposition from the nozzle. These graphene droplets swiftly evaporate and evenly disperse, all while suspended in the air. Upon making impact on its substrate, the surface of the material, the graphene evenly stretches out and expands due to the high kinetic energy delivered by the de Laval nozzle. A single-atom thick layer of graphene is formed upon the substrate.

== Results from conducted experiments ==
Upon departing the spray gun, the graphene flake's tendency to aggregate is reduced due to its quick evaporation and dispersion. Much to the researchers' surprise, this spray method produces flakes that contain substantially less defects that would commonly occur. Common graphene defects including holes and lumps in the layer, and the Stone-Wales defect were absent upon surface impact. The large amount of kinetic energy delivered by the supersonic nozzle creates the healing of these defects, as the graphene flakes stretches upon impact. The carbon atoms within the graphene rearrange to create seamlessly perfect hexagonal lattice structures. The result of these perfect hexagon structures is the creation of a smooth, even layer of graphene. This is a large contrast to the applications of graphene onto large-scale substrates prior to the creation of the graphene spray gun. The graphene layers would commonly contain defecting clumps and spaces, which troubled scientists ever since the discovery of graphene. The graphene spray gun is also regarded as inexpensive when compared to the other methods of large-scale graphene applications. One main factor for its inexpensiveness is that the graphene layers require no post-processing treatment, which was common in the other methods. The other factor is that the spray gun is remarkably simple in both its production and utilization.

== Properties of graphene spray ==
Graphene has many properties that are sought after to be utilized within manufacturing processes. These properties are a result of the interactions between the carbon atoms and their unique hexagonal micro-structure. Whenever a material is sprayed with a graphene layer it will likely be done to be enhanced by or to obtain graphene's unique properties.

=== Transparency ===
Because of graphene's inherent ability to form a one-atom thick sheet when sprayed onto a material, the sheet itself has a high transparency. Graphene has been measured to absorb 2.3% of light meaning a human eye can see through the material. This property has brought about discussions for the possible usage of graphene coating in a wide array of glass manufacturing processes.

=== Corrosion resistance ===
Layered graphene sheets exhibit a high resistance to corrosion on the materials it is added to. The corrosion resistance is largely due to graphene's hydrophobic and electrical properties. Graphene's hydrophobic nature repels caustic water from the material it is sprayed onto. Graphene's electrical properties also decrease redox reactions, further enhancing the corrosion resistance property.

Graphene layers also have the ability to protect materials against microbial-induced corrosion to a far more efficient extent than other typical surface coatings.

=== Oxidation protection ===
Graphene layers are excellent at preventing oxidation reactions from occurring on materials. Oxygen atoms have a tendency to react with the graphene sheets when added to a material. However, the likelihood of oxygen atoms breaking through the graphene sheet to react with the material underneath is low. The prevention of oxidation through the usage of graphene sheets has one fault, namely the current inaccuracies of applying a perfectly shaped layer onto any given material with a spray gun. In order to prevent this and give materials a high resistance to oxidation, multiple layers of graphene can be used.

=== High material strength ===
Graphene layers are extremely strong, being estimated to be around 200 times stronger than steel. The material is also lightweight. Because of these properties and the micro-structure of the sheets the material is capable of stretching to roughly 20% of its original size. These abilities provide the material it has been layered onto with a highly durable and thin barrier.

== Usage ==
Due to graphene's distinctive properties, such as its high strength, high electron mobility, mechanical stiffness, and its ability to conduct both electricity and heat, it serves a plethora of applications. Serving primarily in the field of electronics, several graphene applications include its usage within flexible touch screens, integrated circuits, reinforcement of electrical properties to plastics, biological engineering, optical electronics, energy storage, and photovoltaic cells. Graphene may also be utilized in the field of composite materials and nanotechnology. With the implementation of a graphene spray gun, the material may be evenly dispersed upon a large-scale substrate. The graphene spray gun also provides a more efficient and effective utilization of graphene due to its lack of defects that would otherwise be found in different dispersion methods.
