= SIBLING proteins =

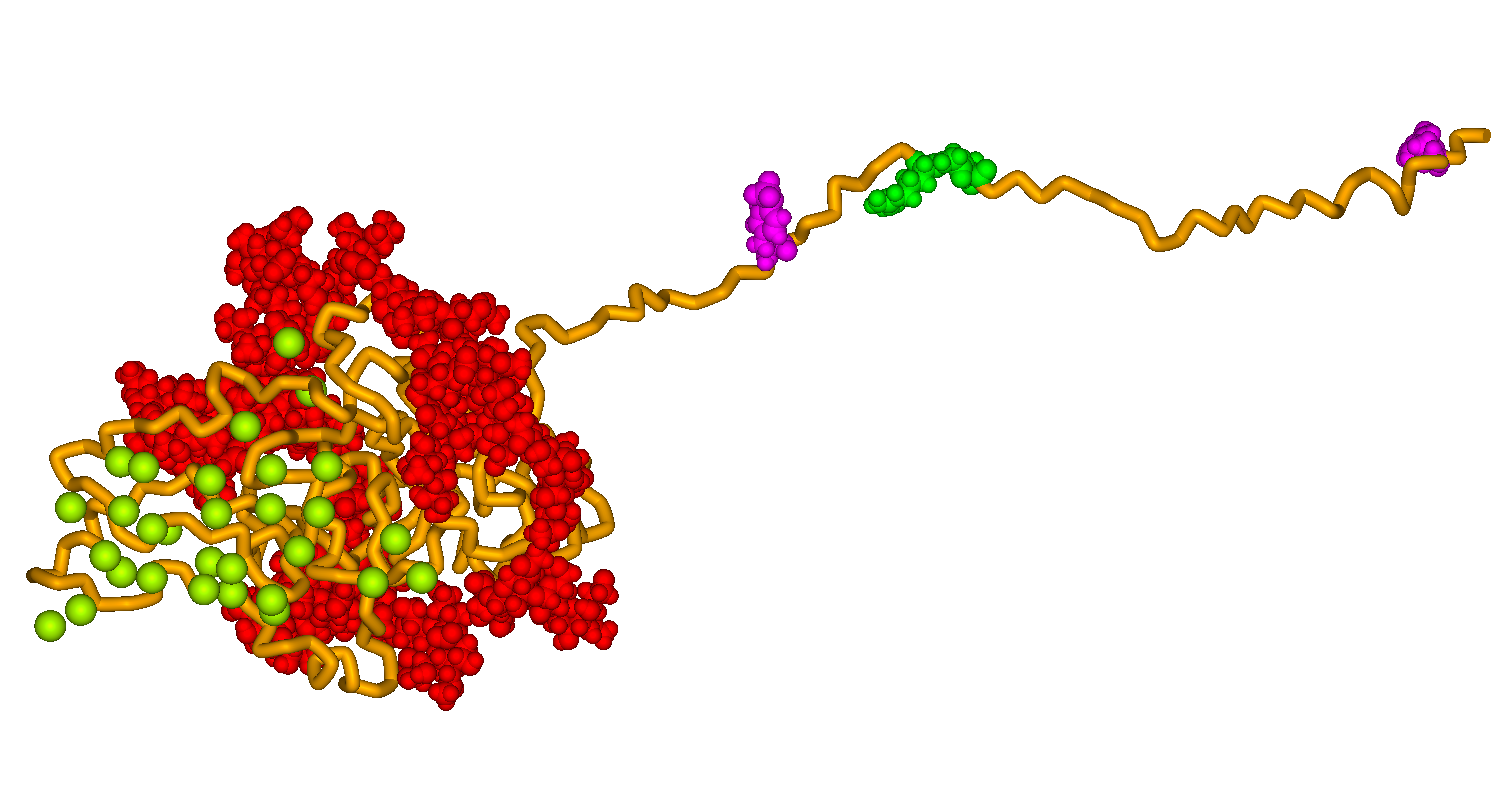
Bone sialoprotein, a member of the SIBLING protein family.

The SIBLING proteins (standing for small integrin-binding ligand, N-linked glycoprotein) are a protein family of non-collagenous proteins, and are vital components in the development of the minerzalied tissues such as bone, dentin, and enamel in vertebrates. They share a common evolutionary history, descending from an ancestral gene which underwent multiple duplications and subsequent divergent evolution across the history of vertebrates, making them paralogs. The SIBLING family is itself a subset of the calcium-binding phosphoprotein group.

== History ==
The SIBLING protein family was conceptually developed between 1999 and 2001, by researchers working at the National Institutes of Health in Bethesda and the Division of Geriatrics at Johns Hopkins School of Medicine in Baltimore, both in Maryland, specifically NIH scientist Larry W. Fisher. The earliest reference of the term is a 2000 patent filed by Fisher and colleagus under the United States Department of Health and Human Services. The first scientific publication with the term and the hypothesis of a common evolutionary history was in 2001, also by Fisher and colleagues.

== Characteristics and function ==
SIBLING proteins are highly soluble, hypdrophilic, and acidic, all owing to extensive amounts of complex carbohydrate chains (or glycans) enzymatically bound to them through the post-translational modification known as glycosylation. In particular, a large fraction of these glycans carry terminal sialic acid residues, making the SIBLING proteins highly interactive with sialic acid-binding lectins known as the SIGLEC protein family.

The family currently contains the following proteins:

1. osteopontin (OPN)
2. bone sialoprotein (BSP, also known in humans as "integrin-binding sialoprotein")
3. dentin matrix protein 1 (DMP1)
4. dentin sialophosphoprotein (DSPP)
5. matrix extracellular phosphoglycoprotein (MEPE)

Enamelin was previous suggested as an additional member, but differences in its binding activity and transcription led to this suggestion being rejected. The genes coding for members of the SIBLING protein family are similarly spliced and are all located on human chromosome 4 (specifically, 4q21-23). They are homologous genes, specifically paralogs meaningly they share an evolutionary history from a single, common ancestor gene which experience duplication mutations. These duplicates underwent separate paths of molecular evolution, leading to the related genes which code for the SIBLING proteins in living taxa today. The SIBLING family is itself a group within the larger secretory calcium-binding phosphoprotein (SCPP) family.

Originally, the SIBLING proteins were characterized only by their extensive role in the development of dentin. Later evidence illustrated their presence and role in other mineralized tissues (mainly enamel and bone), and more recently in healthy non-mineralized tissues such as metabolically active intralobular duct cells in the salivary glands and pancreas.

== Potential role in cancer ==
SIBLING proteins, particularly BSP and OPN, are overexpressed in multiple cancer types, specifically breast, prostate, and lung adenocarcinoma. Aggregates of prostate-specific antigen and SIBLING proteins have been associated with proliferation in prostate cancer, an important metric of tumor grade. Overexpression of DMP1 is documented in 80% of lung tumors.

The protein-degrading enzymes known as matrix metalloproteinases MMP2, MMP3, and MMP9 are activated by BSP, OPN, and DMP1 respectively, and the expression of both those SIBLINGS and metalloproteinases is correlated with tumor grade in oral squamous cell carcinoma.
