= Kochman =

Kochman is a surname. Notable persons with that name include:

- Cary Kochman (born 1965), American businessman
- Charles Kochman, American editor known for having purchased the book rights to Diary of a Wimpy Kid
- Li Kochman (born 1995), Israeli judoka
- Roger Kochman (born 1941), American football player
