= Anne George =

Anne George may refer to:

- Anne George (biologist), American biologist
- Anne George (writer) (1927–2001), American author and poet

== See also ==
- Ann George (1903–1989), British actress
