= Charles Moertel =

American cancer researcher

Charles George Moertel (October 17, 1927 – June 27, 1994) was an American cancer researcher who worked at the Mayo Clinic in Rochester, Minnesota.

== Early life and education ==
Moertel was born in Milwaukee, Wisconsin, on October 17, 1927. He grew up in Maywood, Illinois, and graduated from Proviso East High School. He later graduated from the University of Illinois at Chicago with a medical degree in 1953.

== Career ==
Moertel joined the Mayo Clinic in 1954, after an internship at the Los Angeles County Hospital. He founded the North Central Cancer Treatment Group in 1977. Moertel was actively involved with the Food and Drug Administration's Oncology Drug Advisory Committee during "the late 1970s and early 1980s," and was "a good friend" of the National Cancer Institute's Director at the time, Vincent T. DeVita Jr., although the two of them commonly had professional disagreements.

== Research ==
Moertel was known for research into the effectiveness of cancer treatments. In one study, Moertel and his team reduced colon cancer recurrence by 41% by treating patients with a combination of levamisole and fluorouracil. He presented these results in a 1989 talk he gave to the National Cancer Institute. He is also known for conducting clinical trials of laetrile and vitamin C for the treatment of cancer, and his trials of these treatments found that both of them were ineffective. In 1993, he published a study which found that a commonly used blood test used to detect colon cancer was ineffective at improving cure rates.

== Death ==
Moertel died of lymphoma on June 27, 1994, at his home in Rochester.
