= DMP1 =

Protein-coding gene in the species Homo sapiens

Identifiers
- Aliases: DMP1, ARHP, ARHR, DMP-1, dentin matrix acidic phosphoprotein 1
- External IDs: OMIM: 600980; MGI: 94910; GeneCards: DMP1

Gene location (Human)
| Chr. | Chromosome 4 (human) |
| Band | 4q22.1 | Start | 87,650,280 bp |
| Band | 4q22.1 | End | 87,664,361 bp |

Gene location (Mouse)
| Chr. | Chromosome 5 (mouse) |
| Band | 5 E5|5 50.61 cM | Start | 104,350,479 bp |
| Band | 5 E5|5 50.61 cM | End | 104,361,968 bp |
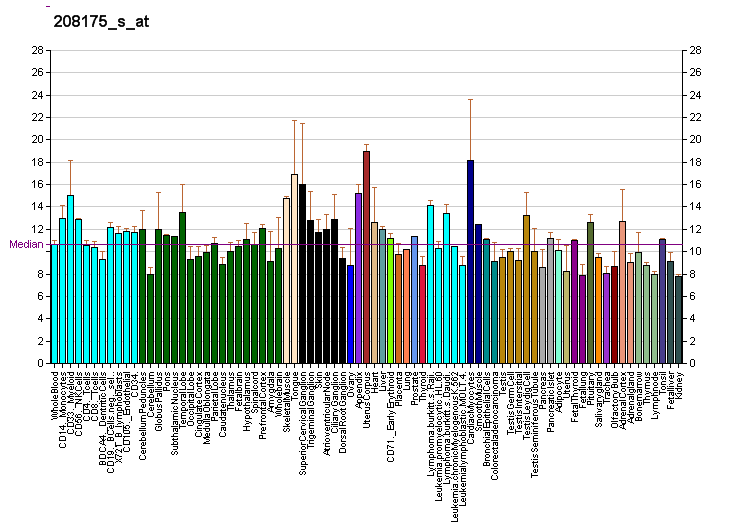

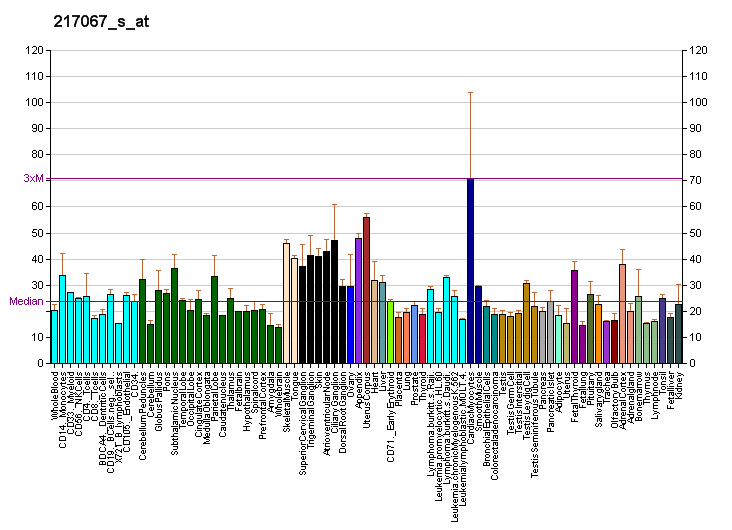
RNA expression pattern
| Bgee | Human / Mouse (ortholog); Top expressed in: periodontal fiber; tibia; testicle; trabecular bone; tendon of biceps brachii; sperm; mucosa of paranasal sinus; lateral nuclear group of thalamus; upper respiratory tract; sensory nervous system / Top expressed in: body of femur; fossa; molar; cochlea; calvaria; lumbar subsegment of spinal cord; ankle; facial motor nucleus; condyle; otolith organ; More reference expression data |
| BioGPS | More reference expression data |
Gene ontology
| Molecular function | calcium ion binding; integrin binding; extracellular matrix binding |
| Cellular component | cytoplasm; extracellular region; nucleus; endoplasmic reticulum lumen; extracellular matrix |
| Biological process | biomineral tissue development; extracellular matrix organization; ossification; positive regulation of cell-substrate adhesion; regulation of enamel mineralization; post-translational protein modification |
Sources:Amigo / QuickGO
Orthologs
| Databases | NCBI: entry; OMA: entry |
| Species | Human | Mouse |
| Entrez | 1758 | 13406 |
| Ensembl | ENSG00000152592 | ENSMUSG00000029307 |
| UniProt | Q13316 | O55188 |
| RefSeq (mRNA) | NM_001079911; NM_004407 | NM_016779; NM_001359013 |
| RefSeq (protein) | NP_001073380; NP_004398 | NP_058059; NP_001345942 |
| Location (UCSC) | Chr 4: 87.65 – 87.66 Mb | Chr 5: 104.35 – 104.36 Mb |
| PubMed search |
- Wikidata
| View/Edit Human | View/Edit Mouse |

Dentin matrix acidic phosphoprotein 1 is a protein that in humans is encoded by the DMP1 gene.

Dentin matrix acidic phosphoprotein is an extracellular matrix protein and a member of the small integrin-binding ligand N-linked glycoprotein (SIBLING) family (other members being DSPP, IBSP, MEPE, and SPP1). This protein, which is critical for proper mineralization of bone and dentin, is present in diverse cells of bone and tooth tissues. The protein contains a large number of acidic domains, multiple phosphorylation sites, a functional Arg-Gly-Asp cell attachment sequence, and a DNA binding domain. In undifferentiated osteoblasts it is primarily a nuclear protein that regulates the expression of osteoblast-specific genes. During osteoblast maturation the protein becomes phosphorylated and is exported to the extracellular matrix, where it orchestrates mineralized matrix formation. Mutations in the gene are known to cause autosomal recessive hypophosphatemia, a disease that manifests as rickets and osteomalacia. The gene structure is conserved in mammals. Two transcript variants encoding different isoforms have been described for this gene.
