= Ana Bedran-Russo =

Brazilian dentist and scientist

Ana Bedran-Russo (née Ana Karina Bedran de Castro) is Associate Dean for Research, Distinguished Professor, and Head of the Department of Oral Biology at the University of Illinois Chicago College of Dentistry.

== Education ==
Originally from Brazil, Bedran-Russo earned her DDS from the Araçatuba School of Dentistry in São Paulo and her MS in operative dentistry/clinical sciences and PhD in dental material sciences from Piracicaba. She came to the United States in 2001 as a visiting research scholar to develop research in biomaterials at the University of North Carolina.

== Career ==
Bedran-Russo has taught at the University of Campinas Piracicaba School of Dentistry, the University of North Carolina at Chapel Hill, Marquette University, and the University of Illinois at Chicago College of Dentistry.

Ana Bedran-Russo is highly recognized in the field of dental biomaterials. She has published in the areas of structural, mechanical, and compositional studies of dentin and interfaces between dental tissues and dental biomaterials. She pioneered the use of bioinspired strategies to mimic native reinforcement mechanisms of various hierarchical levels of the extracellular matrix organization and mediate the biomechanics and biostability of dentin. Among these strategies, her research has utilized nature-derived oligomeric proanthocyanidins as interventional biomaterials, work that has gained attention beyond the field of dentistry.

As a clinician-scientist, Bedran-Russo holds research grants from federal, institutional and association sources. She has published over 250 peer-reviewed papers with over 9,000 citations (h-index: 51). She has served numerous leadership roles, including with the International Association for Dental Research the American Dental Association, and the Academy of Operative Dentistry.

Recognition for Bedran-Russo's work includes a UIC Researcher of the Year Award (2014, Clinical Sciences Rising Star), the 2021 Way Klingler Fellowship Award, the 2023 WISN/IADR Award for Distinguished Female Mentor, the 2023 DMG/IADR Stephen Bayne Career Award, and Crain's Chicago Business "Notable Women in STEM 2023" She is a 2018 alumna of the Hedwig van Ameringen Executive Leadership in Academic Medicine (ELAM) program.

== Private life ==
Her husband, Stephen Russo, is a periodontist.

== See also ==
- List of University of Illinois Chicago people
