= Lynda Bonewald =

American bone researcher

Lynda Faye Bonewald
- Education: University of Texas at Austin, Medical University of South Carolina
- Scientific career
- Fields: Bone, Musculoskeletal system
- Workplaces: University of Missouri–Kansas City, Indiana University School of Medicine

Lynda Bonewald is a professor of anatomy, cell biology, physiology, and orthopaedic surgery and the founding director of the Indiana Center for Musculoskeletal Health (ICMH) at the Indiana University School of Medicine. She studies bone and the musculoskeletal system. She has served as president of the American Society for Bone and Mineral Research (ASBMR, 2012-2013) and the Association of Biomolecular Resource Facilities (1999-2000).

== Early life and education ==
Bonewald graduated from the University of Texas at Austin and earned a Ph.D. in Immunology/Microbiology from the Medical University of South Carolina in 1984.

== Career ==
Bonewald was a post-doctoral fellow at the Ralph H. Johnson Veterans Affairs Medical Center in Charleston, South Carolina where she worked with Makio Ogawa on growth factors for hematopoietic stem cells.

Bonewald joined the University of Texas Health Science Center at San Antonio in 1986 as an assistant professor, working with Gregory Robert Mundy.

In 2001, she joined the University of Missouri–Kansas City (UMKC), becoming the Lefkowitz Professor of Oral Biology and the director of the Bone Biology Research Program at UMKC's School of Dentistry. In 2009, she and her collaborators received funding from the National Institutes of Health through a National Institute of Arthritis and Musculoskeletal and Skin Diseases ‘Grand Opportunity’ grant. In 2009 Bonewald also became director of the UMKC Center of Excellence in the Study of Dental and Musculoskeletal Tissues and took on the newly-created position of Interim Vice Chancellor for Research at UMKC.

In 2015, as Vice Chancellor for Translational and Clinical Research at UMKC, Bonewald became the founding director of the Kansas City Consortium on Musculoskeletal Diseases (KCMD). Leadership of the consortium rotated between its partners, UMKC, the University of Kansas Medical Center and the Kansas City University of Medicine and Biosciences.

As of 2016, Bonewald was appointed as the founding director of the Indiana Center for Musculoskeletal Health (ICMH) at the Indiana University School of Medicine.

Bonewald served as president of the American Society for Bone and Mineral Research (ASBMR) for 2012-2013. She was president of the Association of Biomolecular Resource Facilities for 1999-2000. She has served on the council of the National Institute of Arthritis and Musculoskeletal and Skin Diseases at the NIH.

She is a member of the American Association for Dental Research (AADR), and the International Association for Dental Research (IADR). She has been chair of the Board of Scientific Counselors for the National Institute of Dental and Craniofacial Research (NIDCR).

== Research ==
Bonewald is a leading bone researcher working to better understand the musculoskeletal system, the effects of aging, and the treatment of musculoskeletal diseases such as osteoporosis and sarcopenia. Despite being told that she would waste her time, she focused on a largely ignored topic that she found interesting.

“I kept looking at these beautiful cells that were located inside this hard bone tissue, and I started asking people, ‘What do these cells do?’ ... One colleague said, ‘They don’t do anything,’ and another said, ‘They’re too hard to study. It will ruin your career.’”

Bonewald went on to make important discoveries relating to astrocytes and osteocytes. Astrocytes are cells in the brain and spinal cord. Osteocytes are cells, embedded in the mineralized matrix of bone structure, which are important in muscle-bone interactions and communications between them. Bonewald discovered that osteocytes and muscle cells send signals to each other that influence growth and deterioration of both bone and muscle. Bonewald now studies endocrine crosstalk between bone and muscle and how this relates to aging. Her work has enabled researchers to better understand age-related bone and muscle loss and suggests possible novel treatments.

Bonewald has contributed to the advancement of the field with more than 200 publications, 42 reviews, and four commentaries. She has developed tools which are used globally by researches to study osteocyte biology and function. She holds nine patents.

== Awards ==
- 1985-1986, Damon Runyon Fellow, Damon Runyon Cancer Research Foundation
- 2006, Distinguished Scientist Award in Mineralized Tissue from the International Association for Dental Research (IADR) and the American Association for Dental Research (AADR)
- 2006, W.S.S. Jee Remodeling in Bone (RIB) Award from the Sun Valley Workshop
- 2015, William F. Neuman Award, American Society for Bone and Mineral Research (ASBMR)
- 2019, Fellow, Biological Sciences, American Association for the Advancement of Science (AAAS)
- 2020, Bicentennial Medal, Indiana University
- 2020, Distinguished Professor, Indiana University
- 2021, Fellow, American Society for Bone and Mineral Research
- 2024, Louis V. Avioli Founders Award
