= Jim Knoedel =

Jim Knoedel (born c. 1952) was the head men's and women's cross country and track coach at the University of Illinois at Chicago, retiring at the end of 2016. Knoedel had held that position at the University since 1996. Before UIC, Knoedel was the assistant coach at Loyola University Chicago. He is a 1974 graduate of the University of Iowa

The USA Track & Field National Office selected Knoedel as the head coach for two United States teams. In 1996, he coached the USA women's ekiden team competing in Yokohama, Japan, and, in 1999, he was the junior men's coach at the IAAF World Cross Country Championships in Belfast, Northern Ireland. The junior team placed sixth out of 81 competing countries.
