= Stephen Melamed =

American industrial designer and design educator

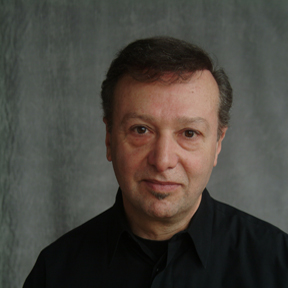
- Born: March 1, 1951; New York City, United States
- Education: University of Illinois at Chicago
- Occupations: Industrial designer, UIC industrial design professor
- Known for: Interdisciplinary Product Development
- Awards: Red Dot IDEA; "Good Design" CEA

Stephen Melamed, Industrial Designers Society of America, is an American industrial designer and design educator. He is a co-founder of the award winning industrial design consulting firm, "Tres Design Group" based in downtown Chicago. He is also a Clinical Professor of Industrial Design and Interdisciplinary Product Development (IPD) at the University of Illinois, Chicago.

== Education and early career ==
Melamed was born March 1, 1951, in New York City, and earned both a bachelors and master's degree in Industrial design from the University of Illinois at Chicago. He also studied under the designer/artist/author Werner Graeff. His mentor throughout his career was Robert Graeff, son of Werner, a Swiss industrial designer, educator and architect in his own right. Melamed began his design career at Koch+Lowy in New York City designing residential lighting and later went on to work in the non-profit sector working for the Museum of Science and Industry in Chicago. While at MS&I, he was co-author with Thomas O Byerts of the report "By Design: Museum Environments for All," As a result of the project, he was a speaker at the 1982 First International Interdisciplinary Design Conference at the United Nations in New York City.

== Tres Design Group ==
In 1985, Melamed formed the Tres Design Group with two colleagues he met in grad school, Luc Heiligenstein and François Geneve. The consultancy initially focused on consumer products, later moving into more industrial and medical products and incorporating human-centered design research and graphical user-interface design. In almost three decades of working as a consultant, Melamed has worked on the research, design and development of countless products and systems.

== Academic Work ==
In 2000, Melamed was recruited to teach at the University of Illinois at Chicago to help create the cross-functional curriculum that became known as "IPD"(Interdisciplinary Product Development). The year-long curriculum combines students from all three disciplines to work together in small teams with a variety of corporate sponsors conducting real-world research. He is one of the founding faculty of the UIC Innovation Center. and was appointed Associate Director of the IPD Program at the Innovation Center.

Since 2010, Melamed has been a consulting Professor for interdisciplinary work at the Universidad Autónoma Metropolitana Azcapotzalco in Mexico City. In 2000, a he was a founding member of the not-for-profit AIGA national design advocacy group, Design For Democracy (D4D) and has served on its board of directors.

== Awards and honors ==
According to his official website at the University of Illinois, his "work has been exhibited in the Pompidou Center in Paris, The Chicago Athenaeum Museum of Design, and The Museum of Modern Art (NY). His work has been reviewed in The Chicago Sun-Times, ID Magazine, The Wall Street Journal, Design Perspectives, Business Week, Architectural Digest, Product Design & Development, Home World Design, Appliance Manufacturer, and CE Times". [

Melamed has been awarded a Design Fellowship by the National Endowment for the Arts (1980) and a World Games Grant from the R. Buckminster Fuller Foundation (1981).

As Principal of the Chicago-based industrial design consulting firm, Tres Design Group, the firm has received international design awards including Red Dot, Benelux, Good Design, CEA (Consumer Electronics Association) and an IDEA Silver Medal for design excellence.

Melamed is listed as a co-inventor in 59 U.S. patents.

In 2010 he was named by Design Intelligence one of the Top 25 Design Educators in the United States, and in 2011 was honored as the Midwest Educator of the Year by the Industrial Designers Society of America.

In 2016 Stephen Melamed earned the distinction of being inducted into the IDSA Academy of Fellows at the IDSA International Conference 2016. The Academy confers this honor to members in good standing who have earned the special respect and affection of the membership through distinguished service to the society and to the profession as a whole. His work archives are now included in Special Collections at the UIC Library.
