= Bone sialoprotein =

Protein-coding gene in the species Homo sapiens

IBSP
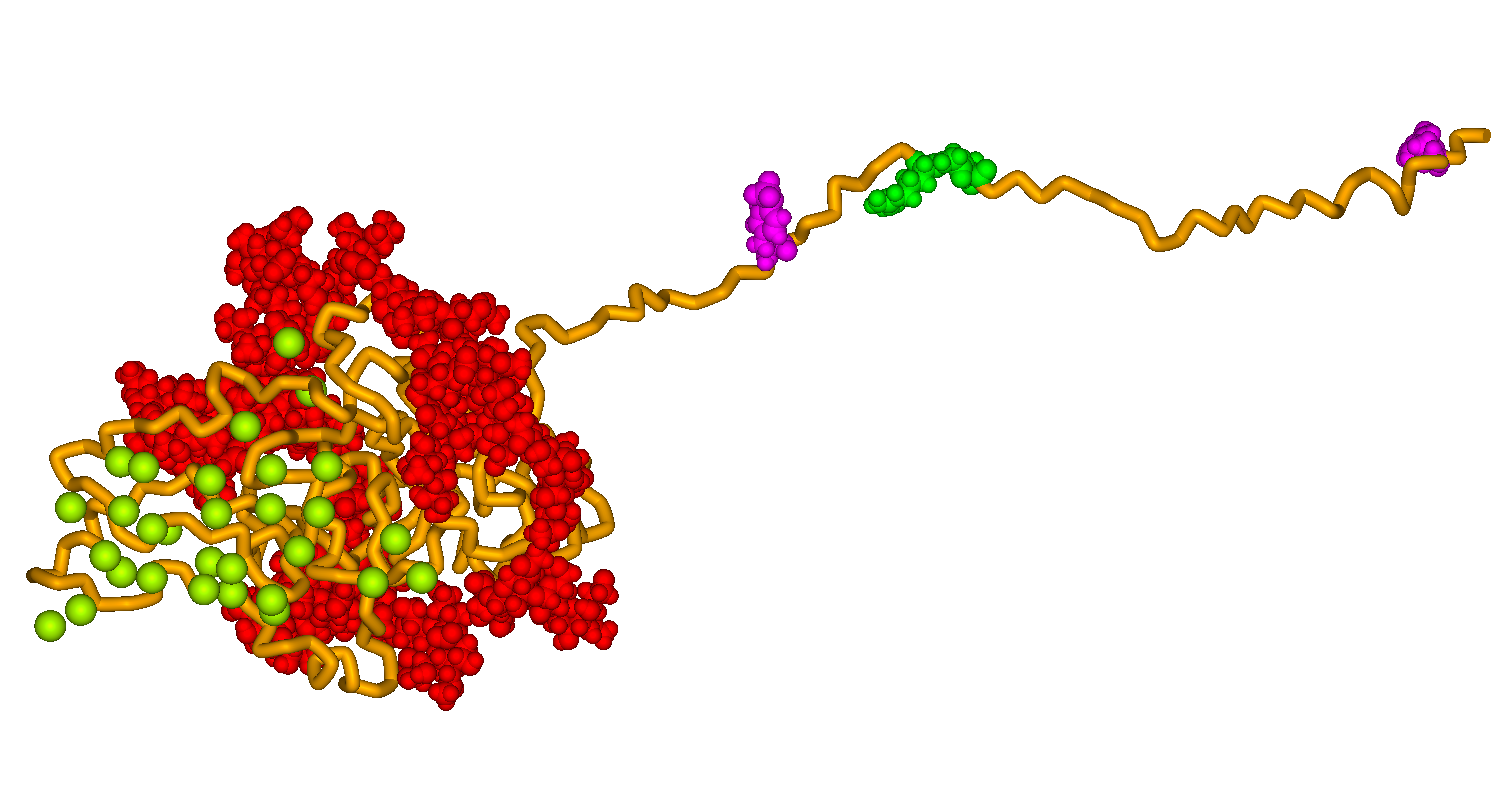

Identifiers
- Aliases: IBSP, BNSP, BSP, BSP-II, SP-II, integrin binding sialoprotein
- External IDs: OMIM: 147563; MGI: 96389; GeneCards: IBSP

Gene location (Human)
Chr.	Chromosome 4 (human)
Band	4q22.1	Start	87,799,554 bp
Band	4q22.1	End	87,812,435 bp

Gene location (Mouse)
Chr.	Chromosome 5 (mouse)
Band	5 E5|5 50.68 cM	Start	104,447,037 bp
Band	5 E5|5 50.68 cM	End	104,459,335 bp
RNA expression pattern
Bgee	Human / Mouse (ortholog); Top expressed in: tibia; periodontal fiber; trabecular bone; amniotic fluid; mucosa of paranasal sinus; frontal pole; middle frontal gyrus; muscle of trunk; Skeletal muscle tissue of rectus abdominis; cerebellar vermis / Top expressed in: body of femur; calvaria; fossa; human fetus; tibiofemoral joint; molar; condyle; stroma of bone marrow; ankle; mandible; More reference expression data
BioGPS	n/a
Gene ontology
Molecular function	integrin binding; molecular function
Cellular component	extracellular matrix; extracellular region; membrane; extracellular space; vesicle
Biological process	biomineral tissue development; bone mineralization; cellular response to growth factor stimulus; cell adhesion; extracellular matrix organization; osteoblast differentiation; ossification; positive regulation of cell adhesion
Sources:Amigo / QuickGO
Orthologs
Databases	NCBI: entry; OMA: entry
Species	Human	Mouse
Entrez	3381	15891
Ensembl	ENSG00000029559	ENSMUSG00000029306
UniProt	P21815	Q61711
RefSeq (mRNA)	NM_004967	NM_008318
RefSeq (protein)	NP_004958	NP_032344
Location (UCSC)	Chr 4: 87.8 – 87.81 Mb	Chr 5: 104.45 – 104.46 Mb
PubMed search
- Wikidata
View/Edit Human	View/Edit Mouse

Bone sialoprotein (BSP) is a component of mineralized tissues such as bone, dentin, cementum and calcified cartilage. BSP is a significant component of the bone extracellular matrix and has been suggested to constitute approximately 8% of all non-collagenous proteins found in bone and cementum. BSP, a SIBLING protein, was originally isolated from bovine cortical bone as a 23-kDa glycopeptide with high sialic acid content.

The human variant of BSP is called bone sialoprotein 2 also known as cell-binding sialoprotein or integrin-binding sialoprotein and is encoded by the IBSP gene.

== Structure ==
Native BSP has an apparent molecular weight of 60-80 kDa based on SDS-PAGE, which is a considerable deviation from the predicted weight (based on cDNA sequence) of approximately 33 kDa. The mammalian BSP cDNAs encode for proteins averaging 317 amino acids, which includes the 16-residue preprotein secretory signal peptide. Among the mammalian cDNAs currently characterized, there is an approximate 45% conservation of sequence identity and a further 10-23% conservative substitution. The protein is highly acidic (pKa of ~ 3.9) and contains a large amount of Glu residues, constituting ~22% of the total amino acid.

Secondary structure prediction and hydrophobicity analyses suggest that the primary sequence of BSP has an open, flexible structure with the potential to form regions of α-helix and some β-sheet. However, the majority of studies have demonstrated that BSP has no α-helical or β-sheet structure by 1D NMR and circular dichroism. Analysis of native protein by electron microscopy confirm that the protein has an extended structure approximately 40 nm in length. This flexible conformation suggests that the protein has few structural domains, however it has been suggested that there may be several spatially segmented functional domains including a hydrophobic collagen-binding domain (rattus norvegicus residues 36–57), a hydroxyapatite-nucleating region of contiguous glutamic acid residues (rattus norvegicus residues 78–85, 155–164) and a classical integrin-binding motif (RGD) near the C-terminal (rattus norvegicus residues 288–291).

BSP has been demonstrated to be extensively post-translationally modified, with carbohydrates and other modifications comprising approximately 50% of the molecular weight of the native protein. These modifications, which include N- and O-linked glycosylation, tyrosine sulfation and serine and threonine phosphorylation, make the protein highly heterogeneous.

A 3D model of human bone sialoprotein has been developed using molecular modelling techniques, as shown in the picture above. The model suggests that the protein provides a flexible template for the rapid self-assembly of calcium and phosphate ions, so nucleating the growth of hydroxyapatite crystals.

== Function ==
The amount of BSP in bone and dentin is roughly equal, however the function of BSP in these mineralized tissues is not known. One possibility is that BSP acts as a nucleus for the formation of the first apatite crystals. As the apatite forms along the collagen fibres within the extracellular matrix, BSP could then help direct, redirect or inhibit the crystal growth.

Additional roles of BSP are angiogenesis and protection from complement-mediated cell lysis. Regulation of the BSP gene is important to bone matrix mineralization and tumor growth in bone.
