= Peter Nelson (researcher) =

American artificial intelligence researcher

Peter C. Nelson is an American artificial intelligence researcher and computer science professor at the University of Illinois at Chicago, and as of 2008 he has been the dean of the College of Engineering. Prior to assuming his deanship, he was head of the UIC Department of Computer Science. He received his B.A. in Computer Science and Mathematics from North Park University in 1984, and subsequently completed both his M.S. in computer science from in 1986 and his Ph.D. in computer science in 1988 from Northwestern University.

UIC's Artificial Intelligence Laboratory, which he founded in 1991, has completed numerous projects in fields such as transportation, manufacturing, bioinformatics, e-mail spam countermeasures, and high-availability computer clusters facilitated by concurrent development of applied intelligence systems and heuristic search algorithms.

He has published over 75 scientific peer-reviewed papers and received over $20 million in research grants and contracts on issues of importance such as computer-enhanced transportation systems, manufacturing, design optimization and bioinformatics. These projects have been funded by organizations such as the National Institutes of Health, the National Science Foundation, the National Academy of Sciences, the U.S. Department of Transportation, Argonne National Laboratory and Motorola. Notably, between 1994 and 1995 the AI laboratory developed the first real-time traffic congestion map on the World Wide Web, the Gateway System, for the Illinois Department of Transportation, which won the Federal Highway Administration's award for "Outstanding Traveler Information Web Sites" two consecutive years (2002–2003). The site now receives over 500 million hits per year.
