= Cynthia Barnes-Boyd =

American academic administrator and professor

- Born: July 8, 1952
- Died: June 28, 2017 (aged 64)
- Occupations: Academic administrator, professor, and nurse

Academic background
- Education: University of Illinois at Chicago
- Thesis: Effects of sustained nurse/mother contact on infant outcomes among low-income African-American families (1990)

Academic work
- Institutions: University of Illinois at Chicago, University of Illinois Mile Square Health Center
- Main interests: Community health

Cynthia "Cee" Barnes-Boyd (1953 – June 28, 2017) was an American academic administrator, professor, and nurse. She was the director of the Office of Community Engagement and Neighborhood Health Partnerships at the University of Illinois Chicago (UIC), and executive director of the University of Illinois Mile Square Health Center. She was a clinical associate professor of community health at the UIC College of Nursing, and a clinical associate professor of community health sciences at the UIC School of Public Health.

== Education ==
Barnes-Boyd earned her nursing degree from the Wesley-Passavant School of Nursing at Northwestern Memorial Hospital in Chicago, Illinois. She became a staff nurse at the University of Illinois Chicago in 1973, and subsequently earned bachelor's, master's, and doctoral degrees in nursing from the school. Her 1990 Ph.D. dissertation was titled Effects of sustained nurse/mother contact on infant outcomes among low-income African-American families.

== Career ==
In 1980, Barnes-Boyd became the assistant director of nursing at the University of Illinois Hospital and Clinics. She held the position until 1991, when she was appointed executive director of the University of Illinois Mile Square Health Center. She subsequently held several other positions in the University of Illinois system, including director of hospital community outreach, and director of the Healthy City Collaborative research organization. She was the director of the Office of Community Engagement and Neighborhood Health Partnerships, in which she worked to engage the community and to create community initiatives including a city-wide nutritional program.

Barnes-Boyd was a clinical associate professor of community health at the UIC College of Nursing, and a clinical associate professor of community health sciences at the UIC School of Public Health.

In the 1990s, Barnes-Boyd co-chaired the Mayor's Advisory Committee on Infant Mortality. In 2006, Barnes-Boyd was named a Robert Wood Johnson Foundation Executive Nurse Fellow. She was also a fellow in the American Academy of Nursing and at the Chicago Institute of Medicine. In 2013, Barnes-Boyd was named to the National Institutes of Health (NIH) National Advisory Council for Nursing Research. In 2017 she became a member of the NIH's Council on Councils for the Division of Program Coordination, Planning, and Strategic Initiatives.

Barnes-Boyd was a Volunteer Chair of the March of Dimes Illinois Chapter Community Service Grants Program, which provides grants towards community programs aimed at improving birth outcomes.

== Personal life ==
Barnes-Boyd was married to Ronald Boyd. She had two children.

== Legacy ==
Barnes-Boyd led a project build a community health center at the John B. Drake Elementary School, which is in the Dearborn Public Housing community in Bronzeville. The clinic opened in 2019, and was named the Cynthia Barnes-Boyd/Drake Health and Wellness Center in her honor. The clinic operates as a part of the University of Illinois healthcare network, and is a Federally Qualified Health Center. It offers services to students of Drake Elementary School, as well as to students at nearby schools and members of the surrounding community.

== Publications ==
- Dancy, Barbara L.; Wilbur, JoEllen; Talashek, Marie; Bonner, Gloria; Barnes-Boyd, Cynthia (September–October 2004). "Community-based research: Barriers to recruitment of African Americans". Nursing Outlook. 52 (5): 234–240. doi:10.1016/j.outlook.2004.04.012. PMID 15499312.
- Barnes-Boyd, Cynthia; Fordham Norr, Kathleen; Nacion, Karla W. (July–August 2001). "Promoting infant health through home visiting by a nurse-managed community worker team". Public Health Nursing. 18 (4): 225–235. doi:10.1046/j.1525-1446.2001.00225.x. ISSN 0737-1209. PMID 11468062.
- Barnes-Boyd, Cynthia; Norr, Kathleen F.; Nacion, Karla W. (June 1996). "Evaluation of an interagency home visiting program to reduce postneonatal mortality in disadvantaged communities". Public Health Nursing. 13 (3): 201–208. doi:10.1111/j.1525-1446.1996.tb00241.x. ISSN 0737-1209. PMID 8677236.
