= Alexa Viscius =

American graphic designer

- Born: Chicago, Illinois, United States
- Education: University of Illinois Chicago (BFA 2011)
- Occupations: Graphic designer; Photographer; Art director; Bassist
- Known for: Bnny
- Website: www.alexaviscius.com

Alexa Viscius is a multi-disciplinary artist from Chicago. She is a graphic designer, photographer, and art director. Viscius is the bassist for the band Bnny, fronted by her twin sister Jessica.

== Career ==
Viscius' work as a graphic designer has included creating posters for the band Dehd and co-creating the identity for Pitchfork Festival 2018 with her sister Jessica. She was the art director at Normal, a female-run studio in Chicago. Her photography has been featured in Pitchfork, The New York Times, and NME. In 2017, Jessica Viscius founded the music group Bnny, then called Bunny. Alexis joined as the group's bassist. Alexa and Jessica co-own and run Ramona's Market, a vintage re-sale shop in Chicago.

Viscius won the Editorial Award at the 2024 Abbey Road Music Photography Awards for a picture of Bnny.

== Personal life ==
Viscius grew up in the suburbs of Chicago with her family, including twin sister Jessica. She completed a BFA from the University of Illinois at Chicago in 2011.
