= Richard Schneirov =

American historian

Richard Schneirov (born 1948) is a Professor Emeritus of history and noted labor historian at Indiana State University.

== Early life and education ==
Schneirov attended Grinnell College from 1966 to 1968, where he helped found and lead that school's chapter of Students for a Democratic Society (SDS). He also started the underground newspaper "Pterodactyl." He transferred to the University of Illinois at Chicago, where he received a bachelor's degree in 1971.

He obtained a master's degree in history in 1975 and a Ph.D. in history in 1984, both from Northern Illinois University.

== Career ==
Schneirov was named a Fulbright Scholar after receiving his doctorate. During the 1985 to 1986 academic year, he lectured at the Institut Fur England und Amerikastudien at the University of Frankfurt in Frankfurt am Main, Germany. He returned to Germany in 2011, where he taught at Westfallische Wilhelms-Universitat in Muenster.

In 1986, Schneirov won appointment as an adjunct professor at Ohio State University.

In 1989, Schneirov was named an assistant professor at Indiana State University. He was promoted to associate professor in 1993, and made a full professor in 1999.

In 2020 Schneirov entered "phased retirement" from Indiana State University.

== Research interests ==
Schneirov is a noted scholar of working-class history and of the Gilded Age-Progressive Era. Much of his research has focused on the American labor movement during the Gilded Age. He has also researched the period of the 1960s and 70s.

Schneirov's most notable work is his 1998 book, Labor and Urban Politics: Class Conflict and the Origins of Modern Liberalism in Chicago, 1864-97. The work won the Urban History Association's Kenneth Jackson Award in 1999 for best book in North American urban history. The book is a definitive account of the rise of the Chicago labor movement during the Great Railroad Strike of 1877, the struggle for the eight-hour day, and the Pullman Strike of 1894.

The work is considered a major reinterpretation of Gilded Era history. Schneirov's thesis is that the American labor movement exerted a profound influence on Chicago and urban politics, and radically transformed liberal and progressive political thought. As noted labor scholar Joseph McCartin observed:

Richard Schneirov has written an ambitious and important book. It is ambitious in that it aims to combine the concerns of labor history and of political history in order to offer a new perspective on both the origins of modern liberalism and the nature of the late nineteenth-century class formation and labor organization. It is important in that Schneirov's fusion of class and politics yields a set of fresh insights that are likely to engage historians for a long time to come.

In 2006 Schneirov contributed an important article periodizing the Gilded Age: "Thoughts on Periodizing the Gilded Age: Capital Accumulation, Society, and Politics, 1873-1898" and rejoinder to responses by Rebecca Edwards and James L Huston, Journal of the Gilded Age and Progressive Era 5 (July 2006): 189–240.

In 2012, Schneirov has published "Chicago in the Age of Capital: Class, Politics, and Democracy during the Civil War and Reconstruction" (with John B. Jentz). The book charts the rise of a capitalist economy and society out of an artisan one and the ensuing political consequences.

In 2014 Routledge published his extended essay and primer on American democracy (with Gaston Fernandez), "Democracy as a Way of Life in America: A History."

In 2019 Schneirov published a re-interpretation of AFL founder Samuel Gompers in “Uncovering the Contradictions in Samuel Gompers’s ‘More’: Reading ‘What Does Labor Want?” Journal of the Gilded Age and Progressive Era. Schneirov views Gompers as a leader who tried to bridge diverse discourses and political viewpoints within the late nineteenth century labor movement, rather than simply representing a narrow stratum of craft workers.

== Publications ==
[Many of the articles below are available on Academia.edu]

=== Solely authored books ===
- Labor and Urban Politics: Class Conflict and the Origins of Modern Liberalism in Chicago, 1864-97. Urbana, Ill.: University of Illinois Press, 1998. ISBN 0-252-02374-9
- Pride and Solidarity: A History of the Plumbers and Pipefitters of Columbus, Ohio, 1889-1989. Ithaca, N.Y.: Industrial and Labor Relations Press, 1993. ISBN 0-87546-306-1

=== Co-authored books ===
- Schneirov, Richard and Jentz, John B., Chicago in the Age of Capital: Class, Politics, and Democracy during the Civil War and Reconstruction. Urbana: University of Illinois Press, 2012. ISBN 0-252-03683-2
- Schneirov, Richard and Suhrbur, Thomas J. Union Brotherhood, Union Town: The History of the Carpenters Union of Chicago, 1863-1987. Carbondale, Ill.: Southern Illinois University Press, 1988. ISBN 0-8093-1352-9

=== Edited books and collections ===
- The Pullman Strike and the Crisis of the 1890s: Essays on Labor and Politics. Richard Schneirov, Shelton Stromquist and Nick Salvatore, eds. Urbana, Ill.: University of Illinois Press, 1999. ISBN 0-252-02447-8
- American Labor and American Democracy, by William English Walling. Rutgers, N.J.: Transaction Publishers, 2005 (orig. pub. 1926). Schneirov contributed an introduction and bibliography of Walling's works to the republication of this book. ISBN 1-4128-0472-8
- Two issues of the Journal of the Gilded Age and Progressive Era on socialism (Summer and Fall 2003).

=== Solely authored articles ===
- “Urban Regimes and the Policing of Strikes in Two Gilded Age Cities: New York and Chicago,” Studies in American Political Development 33:2 (Sept. 2019): 258–74.
- “Martin Sklar’s Beautiful American (Post)Imperialism,” (contribution to symposium on Martin Sklar) Telos 186 (Spring 2019): 1–16.
- “Uncovering the Contradictions in Samuel Gompers’s ‘More’: Reading ‘What Does Labor Want?” Journal of the Gilded Age and Progressive Era 18 (Jan. 2019): 99–119.
- "Thoughts on Periodizing the Gilded Age: Capital Accumulation, Society, and Politics, 1873-1898." Journal of the Gilded Age and Progressive Era. 5:3 (July 2006).
- "The Failures of Success: Class and Craft Relations in the Construction Industry in the Twentieth Century." Labor History. 46:4 (November 2005).
- "The Odyssey of William English Walling: Revisionism, Social Democracy, and Evolutionary Pragmatism." Journal of the Gilded Age and Progressive Era. 2:4 (Fall 2003).
- "Political Cultures and the Role of the State in Labor's Republic: The View from Chicago, 1848-1877." Labor History. 32:3 (Summer 1991).
- "Rethinking the Relation of Labor to the Politics of Urban Social Reform in Late Nineteenth-Century America: The Case of Chicago." International Labor and Working Class History. #46 (Fall 1994).
- "Voting as a Class: Haymarket and the Rise of a Democrat-Labor Alliance in Late-Nineteenth Century Chicago." Labor's Heritage. 12:2 (Spring/Summer 2004).
- “Chicago’s Great Upheaval of 1877: Class Polarization and Democratic Politics” in The Great Strike of 1877: New Perspectives, ed. David Stowell (Urbana: University of Illinois Press, 2008).
- "Contingent Faculty: A New Social Movement Takes Shape." WorkingUSA. 6:4 (Spring 2003).

=== Co-authored articles ===
- Schneirov, Matthew and Richard. “Capitalism as a Social Movement: The Corporate and Neoliberal Reconstructions of the American Political Economy in the Twentieth Century,” Social Movement Studies, 15:6 (2016): 561–76.
- Schneirov, Richard and Jentz, John B. "Chicago's Fenian Fair of 1864: A Window into the Civil War as a Popular Political Awakening." Labor's Heritage. 6:3 (Winter 1995).

=== Solely authored book chapters ===
- “Chicago’s Great Upheaval of 1877: Class Polarization and Democratic Politics” in The Great Strike of 1877: New Perspectives, ed. David Stowell (Urbana: University of Illinois Press, 2008).
- "Class Conflict, Municipal Politics, and Governmental Reform in Gilded Age Chicago, 1871-1875." In German Workers in Industrial Chicago, 1850-1910. Hartmut Keil and John B. Jentz, eds. DeKalb, Ill.: Northern Illinois University Press, 1983. ISBN 0-87580-089-0
- "Free Thought and Socialism in the Czech Community in Chicago, 1875-1887." In "Struggle a Hard Battle": Essays on Working-Class Immigrants. Dirk Hoerder, ed. DeKalb, Ill.: Northern Illinois University Press, 1986. ISBN 0-87580-533-7
