= Roberta M. Feldman =

American architect

Roberta M. Feldman is an American architect and educator, recognized for her contributions to architectural education and her focus on community-oriented design. She is Professor Emerita at the University of Illinois Chicago School of Architecture, where she has collaborated with Chicago housing and community organizations to address challenges in low-income neighborhoods.

== Education ==
Feldman received her PhD from the Graduate Center of the City University of New York.

== Career ==
Feldman studied at the School of Architecture, University of Illinois at Chicago. In 1994, she co-founded the City Design Center at the University of Chicago, an interdisciplinary initiative that encompasses research, design, and community engagement. Her works are based on communities methodological approach of participatory design and action research. During her time at the university, she served as Director of Architecture Graduate Studies and Associate Vice Chancellor for Academic Affairs.

Feldman, along with her colleagues Bryan Bell, Sergio Palleroni, and David Perkes, received a grant from the 2011 Fellows of the American Institute of Architects' Latrobe Prize to study public interest strategies in architecture in the U.S. and internationally. Their report, "Wisdom From the Field: Public Interest Architecture in Practice", describes the work of 100 public interest design and research practitioners and 50 of their community and governmental partners, particularly focusing on 'how to' engage in this type of work.

Feldman's research has focused on affordable and public housing design. She has served on the boards of the Graham Foundation for Advanced Studies in the Fine Arts, the Environmental Design Research Association (EDRA), and the National Public Housing Museum.

== Awards ==
In addition to the awards she has won, Feldman also has an award named after her: the Roberta Feldman Architecture for Social Justice Award, established in 2020 and awarded by AIA Chicago.

- Association for Community Design Award for Excellence, 2001
- EDRA/Places Research Award, 2005
- Association of Collegiate Schools of Architecture Collaborative Practice Award, 2007-2008
- AIA Chapter Distinguished Service Award, 2008
- ACSA Collaborative Practice Award, 2008
- EDRA/Places/Metropolis Award for Research, 2008
- ACSA Service Award, 2011
- Latrobe Prize with Sergio Palleroni, David Perkes, and Bryan Bell, 2011
- The Association of Collegiate Schools of Architecture Collaborative Practice Award with Charles Leek. 2011
- Environmental Design Research Association Career Award, 2014
- Women in Architecture award, 2016
- Distinguished Service Award, 2017

== Selected publications ==
- Co-author of The Dignity of Resistance: Women Residents’ Activism in Public Housing with Susan Stall.
- Feldman, Roberta A. (2013). "Social Justice Through Historic Preservation". Architectural Encounters: Historic Preservation and People's History. Jane Adams Hull Museum.
- Feldman, Roberta M.; Kim, Jieun (2012). "Residential Autobiographies". In Carswell, Andrew T. (ed.). The Encyclopedia of Housing (Second ed.). Sage.
- Feldman, Roberta M. (2011). "Supporting Grassroots Resistance: Sustained Community/University Partnerships to Contest Chicago's HOPE VI Progra". In Sutton, Sharon E.; Kemp, Susan P. (eds.). The Paradox of Urban Space: Inequity and Transformation in Marginalized Communities. Palgrave Macmillan.
- Feldman, Roberta M.; Wheaton, James (2007). The Chicago Greystone in Historic North Lawndale. University of IL Chicago City Design Center. ISBN 978-0-9789650-0-6.
- Feldman, Robert M.; Stall, Susan (2006). The Dignity of Resistance: Women Residents' Activism in Public Housing. Cambridge University Press. ISBN 978-0-521-59686-2.
