= Bnny =

American indie rock band

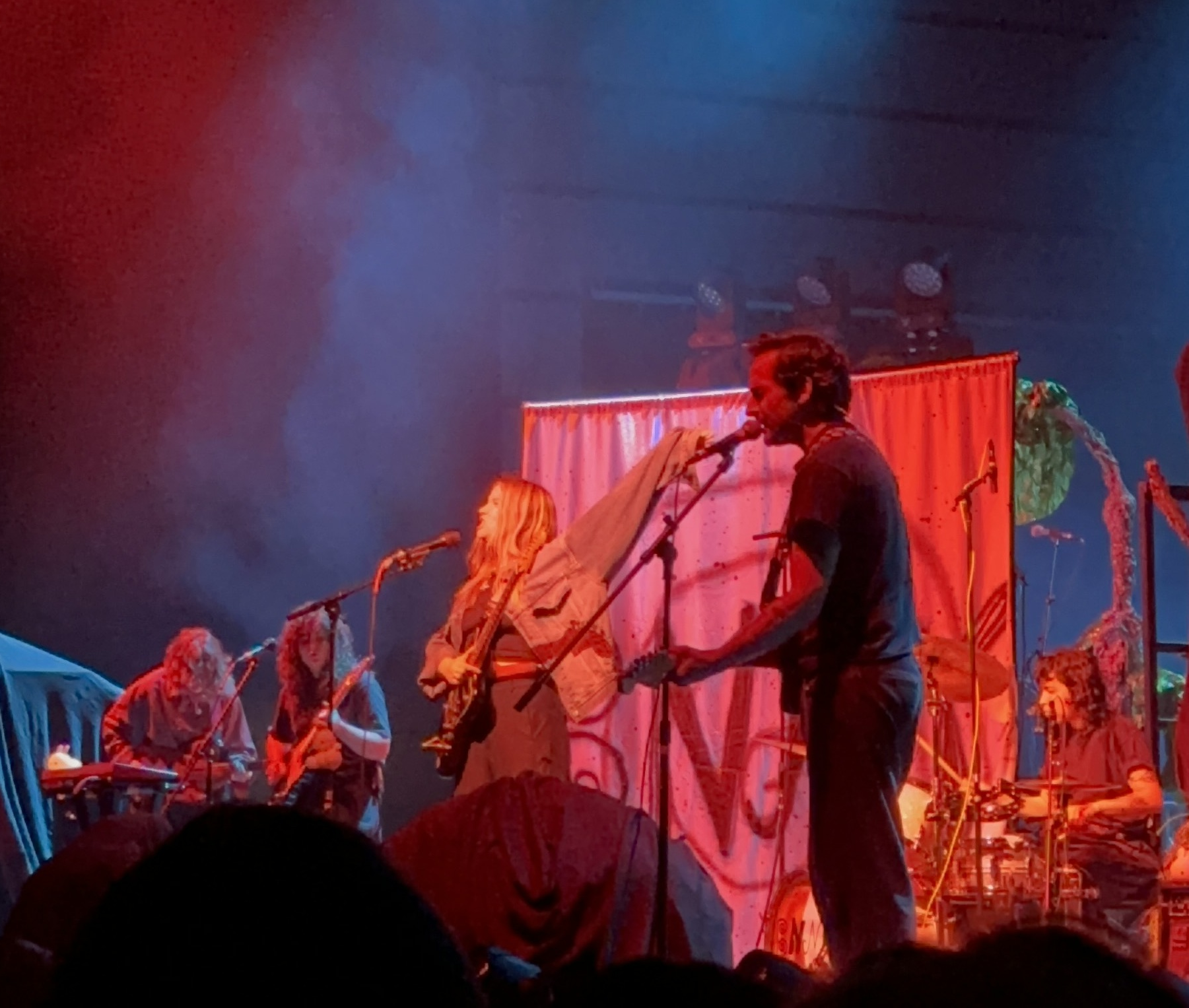
- In concert in 2025

Background information
- Origin: Chicago, Illinois, United States
- Years active: 2017 –present
- Members: Jessica Viscius (vocals); Alexa Viscius (bass); Adam Schubert (guitar); Tim Makowski (guitar); Matt Pelkey (drums)
- Website: www.bnnyband.com

Bnny is an American indie rock band led by Jessica Viscius. The band also consists of Alexa Viscius, Adam Schubert, Tim Makowski and Matt Pelkey. Originally a solo project of Jessica's named Bunny, Jessica Viscius released a couple of singles in 2017 before releasing her debut EP, Sucker the same year. The band released their first full-length album, Everything, in 2021. Their second album, One Million Love Songs, was released April 26, 2024.

== History ==
In 2017, Jessica Viscius, also known as Jess, formed a musical solo project called Bunny. She came up with the name after purchasing a vintage patch with a red bunny on it. Bunny had been preparing to tour and release an EP when Viscius' partner Trey Gruber died. Viscius moved away from the initially EP and recorded new music at Public House in Chicago. Bunny's debut EP, Sucker, was released in 2017.

Tim Makowski, Matt Pelkey, and Jessica's twin sister, Alexa Viscius, joined the band and changed the name to Bnny. Adam Schubert joined later. Jess Viscius sings and is the group's primary songwriter. Alexa Viscius is the band's bassist. Schubert and Makowski play guitar while Pelkey is the group's drummer.

Bnny began recording for their first full-length album in 2019. In 2021, Bnny announced they had signed with Fire Talk Records and plans to release their debut full-length album. In August, the group released the second single from the album, titled "August". Everything, the band's debut LP was released on August 20, 2021, with Fire Talk. The album was produced by Jason Balla of Dehd. The first half of the album consists of songs written as early as 2015, while Jessica Viscius was in a relationship with Gruber. The latter half were written after his death. Upon its release, Everything was named Bandcamp's "Album of the Day". The album received positive reviews.

In 2022, Bnny released the single "Breaking Up" on Fire Talk Records.

Bnny released their second full-length album, One Million Love Songs, in 2024. One Million Love Songs was recorded over the course of two weeks in Asheville, North Carolina with co-producer Alex Farrar. The album cover is a photograph taken by Alexa Viscius. The album's lead single, "Good Stuff", was released in January 2024. A second single from the album, "Crazy Baby", was released in February. Discussing One Million Love Songs, Jessica Viscius described the band as being made up of her, her sister Alexa, Alexa's husband Adam Schubert, and “a drummer, who’s usually revolving”.

== Discography ==
- Sucker (EP - 2017)
- Everything (2021)
- One Million Love Songs (2024)
