= Anne George (biologist) =

Dr. Anne George is a Professor of Oral Biology at the University of Illinois at Chicago College of Dentistry and holds the Allan G. Brodie Endowed Professorship, and she also is an adjunct professor in the Department of Cell and Anatomy and the Department of Engineering at the University of Illinois Medical School. She has been a faculty member at Northwestern University in Chicago, where she was given a Teaching Excellence Award in 1999.

George is a leading researcher on the subject of identification and characterization of acidic proteins involved in dentin mineralization. In vertebrates, bone, teeth, and cementum are the principal mineralized tissues. She also is a leading researcher on dentin matrix proteins and is working on cloning phosphophoryn genes, the most abundant non-collagenous extracellular component in dentin, and on synthesizing protein-based templates for bone and dentin regeneration.

George earned her M.Sc. in organic chemistry from the University of Saurashtra, India, in 1978; her Ph.D. in physical chemistry from the University of Madras, India, in 1983; and was a postdoctoral research fellow at Northwestern University from 1988 to 1993. Her postdoctoral work at Northwestern was in connective tissue biology.

She holds a patent on fibrous protein fusions and use thereof in the formation of advanced organic/inorganic composite materials. George has made more than 100 scientific meeting presentations and invited lectures around the world and had published more than 65 articles in scientific journals. She has received eight research grants as well.

== See also ==
- List of University of Illinois Chicago people
