= Oncology Drug Advisory Committee =

US committee

The Oncologic Drugs Advisory Committee (ODAC) receives requests for technical and clinical evaluation of new drugs by the U.S. Food and Drug Administration (FDA). The committee, consisting of members from academic and clinical oncology biostatistics, the general public, and the pharmaceutical industry, makes non-binding recommendations to both the CDER and CBER divisions of the FDA about the advisability of approving new medications to treat cancer.
