= Marc J. Lane =

American attorney and businessman (born 1946)

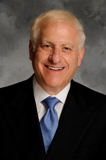
- Born: 1946 (age 79–80)
- Education: Northwestern University School of Law; University of Illinois Chicago
- Occupations: attorney, financial advisor, author

Marc J. Lane (born 1946) is an American attorney and businessman. He is also a founding partner of the Chicago chapter of the Social Enterprise Alliance (SEA), a network of philanthropy-minded investors. In 2020, Lane and other members of SEA - Chicago moved on to establish Social Enterprise Chicago in place of SEA - Chicago, where Lane now serves as president. Lane was involved in creation of the legislation to allow low-profit limited liability companies in Illinois.

== Education and early career ==
Lane graduated from Northwestern University School of Law in 1971 and subsequently founded The Law Offices of Marc J. Lane. In 1985, he established his own NASD-licensed (now the Financial Industry Regulatory Authority (FINRA)-licensed) broker-dealer. Now, Marc J. Lane Wealth Group includes The Law Offices of Marc J. Lane, P.C.; Marc J. Lane & Company, a FINRA -registered, full-service general securities firm; and Marc J. Lane Risk Management, Inc., an insurance agency.

== Career ==
Lane undertook an eight-year research project to determine how investment choices can be used to communicate clients' values, along with their money, to heirs. In 2003, Lane developed a new socially responsible investing approach, termed Advocacy Investing. In 2005, he published a book on the subject entitled Profitable Socially Responsible Investing? An Institutional Investor's Guide. Lane's investment strategy generated a result that beat the Russell 3000 benchmark by an annual return of 2.53% over the eight years ending December 31, 2003.

Lane's approach was discussed with both affirmative and skeptical views by the mainstream media. The Wall Street Journal commented that Lane's theories added a new variation to the socially responsible theme. "Lane made the case that the way to do right by your conscience and your portfolio is to drop the typical SRI strategy of 'negative screening.' Instead, Lane's way is to match the specific values of an investor with companies that have similar operational values. For example, a food bank with an endowment to invest would want to buy the stock of a company with a good human rights record, despite the fact that this company might also happen to produce beer." Elizabeth Wine, reporter for On Wall Street magazine, noted that Advocacy Investing has become the new generation of socially responsible investing. She wrote, "Advocacy investing pushes the idea of sustainability, not just in the narrow environmental sense, but also in the sense of a company's long term potential to compete and succeed." William Baue acknowledged that Lane's book provided an tool for fiduciaries and advanced original research but cautioned readers to take the findings with the same grain of salt that Lane sprinkled on others' research, as Lane excluded mutual funds from the purview of his study for practical reasons.

A book on corporate governance, Representing Corporate Officers and Directors, was published in 1987, and revised in 2005 and in 2010. His Advising Entrepreneurs: Dynamic Strategies for Financial Growth was published by Wiley in 2001. Most recently, Lane released the book, The Mission-Driven Venture: Business Solutions to the World's Most Vexing Social Problems, published by John Wiley and Sons in 2015, and was acclaimed as “arguably the most prolific writer in the social enterprise sector,” by Rolfe Larson in his review of the book.

=== Activities ===
He is vice chair of the Cook County Commission on Social Innovation, and was formerly chairman of the Task Force on Social Innovation, Entrepreneurship, and Enterprise of Illinois.

Lane, who is described by Forbes as "a leader in developing the L3C concept," is one of the drafters of the Illinois legislation to allow low-profit limited liability companies, which took effect January 1, 2010.

Lane has previously taught a course on social enterprise at Northwestern University Pritzker School of Law, and is currently an instructor for University of Illinois at Chicago's Social Enterprise Certificate program.
