= Cary Kochman =

American banker (born 1965)

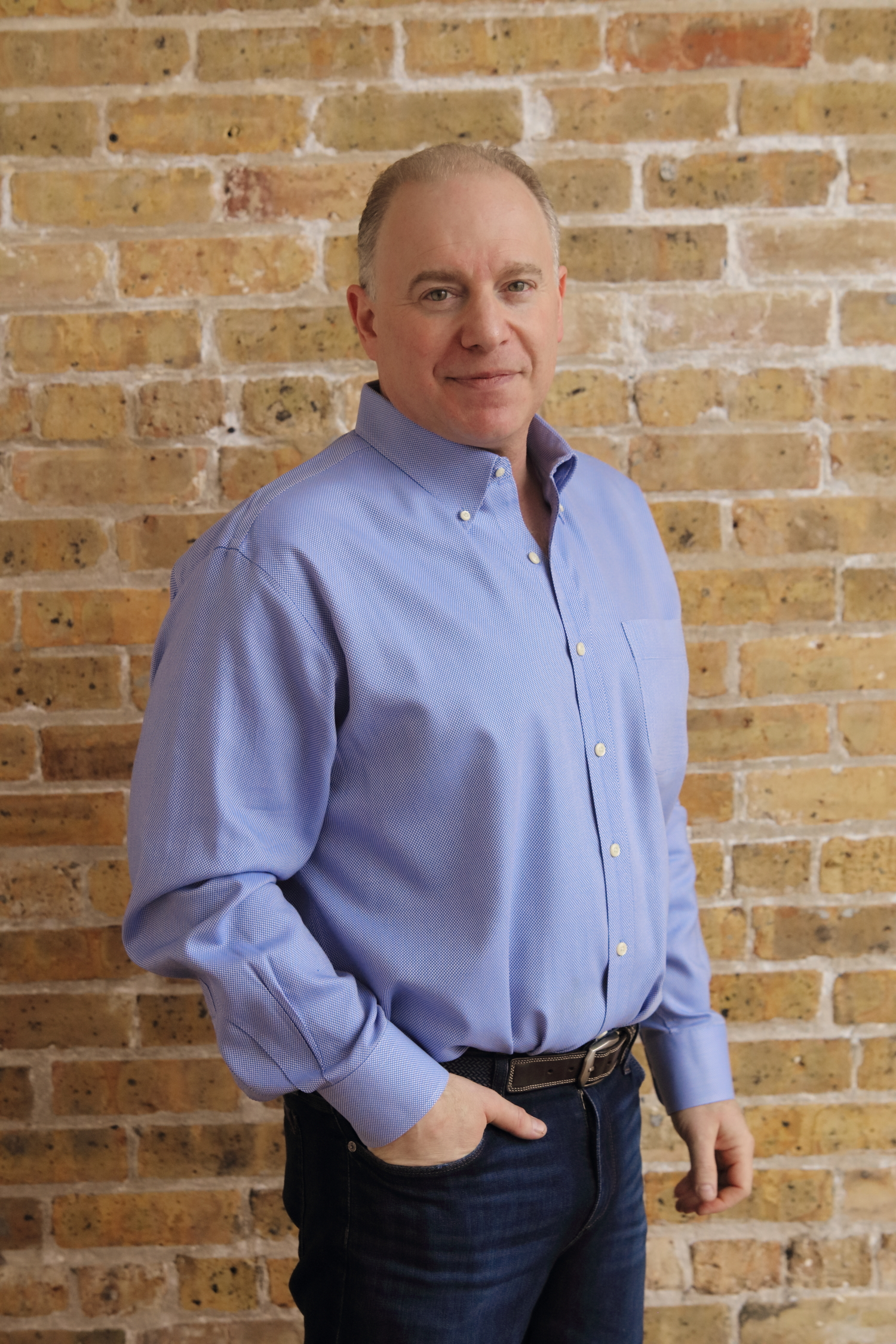
- Cary Kochman
- Born: April 1965 (age 61)
- Education: University of Illinois at Chicago; University of Chicago Law School; Booth School of Business
- Occupation: Banker
- Years active: 1999–present
- Employer: Citigroup
- Board member of: Board of Trustees for the Council for Emerging National Security Affairs (CENSA)

Cary Allan Kochman (born April 1965) is an American banker and the retired Sole Head of the Global Mergers and Acquisitions Group at Citigroup, as well as the Chairman of the Chicago Citi office. He also served as a member of the Global Investment Banking Operating and Risk Committees. He has also specialized in Mergers and Acquisitions.

== Early life ==
Cary Kochman graduated from the Honors College at the University of Illinois at Chicago in 1986 with a BS in accounting. Kochman also studied philosophy (with an emphasis on epistemology) through the Honors College. He continued his education at the University of Chicago, where he received his J.D. from the University of Chicago Law School and his MBA from the Booth School of Business in 1990. While at the University of Chicago, he attended the London Business School and was also awarded a Nikko Fellowship for study in Tokyo, Japan. Kochman is a member of the Illinois Bar and has completed both the C.P.A. and C.M.A. exams.

== Career ==
Through January 2025, prior to retiring from Citi, Cary Kochman served as the Sole Head of Global Mergers and Acquisitions Group and the Chairman of Chicago Citi office for Citigroup Global Markets Inc. He was a member of the Global Operating Committee for BCMA (Banking, Capital Markets & Advisory). Prior to joining Citigroup in 2011, Kochman was the Joint Global Head of Mergers & Acquisitions at UBS.

Kochman was recruited to UBS in March 2004 as Co-Head of Americas Mergers & Acquisitions. While at UBS, he was also Co-Head of the Investment Banking Department's (IBD's) Chicago office and Midwest Region. He was also a member of the UBS Americas IBD Executive Committee.

Before joining UBS in 2004, Kochman worked at Credit Suisse (formerly known as Credit Suisse First Boston). He was the Head of the US M&A Department for the last two years of his fourteen-year tenure with the company, prior to which he held various senior positions at Credit Suisse, including Head of Industrial Corporate Advisory & Finance and Head of Industrial M&A.

== Advisory experience ==
Over the course of his career, Kochman has advised on over $1 trillion worth of transactions. He focused on advising on mergers, acquisitions, divestitures, and other related projects. He advised Shire (FTSE top 20 Company) on its $82 billion sale to Takeda Pharmaceutical. At the time, the deal was reported as the largest Japanese cross-border transaction and the largest international healthcare M&A transaction.

Kochman served as a financial advisor to Catalent during their February 2024 sale to Novo Holdings for $16.5 billion and also advised USCellular on their sale of their wireless business and spectrum assets to T-Mobile for $4.3 billion.

He advised Rockwell Collins on their sale to United Technologies for over $30 billion. He advised Deere & Company on their acquisition of German private company Wirtgen.

He advised on Baxalta's $38 billion cross-border sale to Shire.

He advised Schneider Electric’s acquisition of the remaining public state in Aveva.

Over the course of his career he has also advised on numerous high-profile transactions including: ISCAR's sale to Warren Buffett's Berkshire Hathaway, URS merger with AECOM, Bucyrus International on its sale to Caterpillar, the sale of Tim Horton's to Burger King & 3G, Robbins & Myers’ sale to National Oilwell Varco, the merger of Eaton & Cooper Industries, Verint's merger with Comverse Technology, Whitman's realignment with PepsiCo and subsequent acquisition of Pepsi Americas, Zimmer Holdings’ cross-border hostile takeover of Centerpulse AG (named "deal of the year") and the Margaret Cargill Foundation with regard to their Cargill stake monetization via the tax efficient split-off of Mosaic. This monetization funded the Margaret A. Cargill Philanthropies, creating the world's third largest funded charitable trust. He advised France's Schneider Electric on their acquisition of Larsen & Toubro's Electrical and Automation division (based in India). He also worked with GGP and American National Bank on their respective sale transactions to Brookfield Property Partners.

== Memberships and organizations ==
Cary Kochman has formerly served as a member of The University of Chicago Law School Visiting Committee, as well as a member of the "Council on Chicago Booth", a committee that advises The University of Chicago Booth School of Business.

Kochman has held advisory and trustee roles in several civic and business organizations, including GreenLight Chicago, the Council for Emerging National Security Affairs (CENSA), and The Commercial Club of Chicago. He also served for more than a dozen years as Trustee of the Shedd Aquarium. In the past, he served on the advisory board for L.E.K. Consulting.
