= Alexander Yarin =

Russian-American engineer

Alexander L. Yarin is a Soviet-Israeli-American applied physicist and engineer, from 2006 and currently Richard and Loan Hill Professor and UIC Distinguished Professor at University of Illinois, Chicago and an Elected Fellow of the American Physical Society.

Born in 1953 in Alma-Ata (Kazakhstan), he graduated from the physico-mathematical school N 30 in Leningrad in 1970, then, from the Physico-Mechanical Department of the Polytechnic Institute in Leningrad in 1977 as MSc in Applied Physics, became PhD (1980) and Doctor (DSc, Habilitation) (1989) of Physico-Mathematical Sciences at the Institute for Problems in Mechanics of the Academy of Sciences of the USSR in Moscow where he worked. Professor at the Technion-Israel Institute of Technology in 1990-2005 (Eduard Pestel Chair in Mechanical Engineering in 1999-2005).

Professor Yarin was a Fellow of the Rashi Foundation, The Israel Academy of Sciences and Humanities, a Fellow of the Center of Excellence “Smart Interfaces” at the Technical University Darmstadt, Germany. He was awarded The Gutwirth Award, The Hershel Rich Prize, and The Prize for Technological Development for Defense against Terror of the American-Technion Society, and the 3rd Prize of The Society of Mechanics, Taiwan.

He is one of the three co-Editors of ‘Springer Handbook of Experimental Fluid Mechanics’, 2007, an Associate Editor of the journal “Experiments in Fluids”, and a member of the Editorial Advisory Board of ‘Physics of Fluids’, the Bulletin of the Polish Academy of Sciences, and ‘Archives of Mechanics’.

Professor Yarin also held concurrent and visiting positions at the Moscow Physico-Technical Institute, the Moscow Aviation Technology Institute, the Institute of Physics, Slovak Academy of Sciences, Bratislava, Czechoslovakia, Max-Planck-Institute für Strömungsforschung, Göttingen, Germany, the Isaac Newton Institute for Mathematical Sciences, University of Cambridge, U.K., University of Erlangen - Nurnberg, Germany, University of Wisconsin-Madison, Madison, WI, USA, Centre of Excellence for Advanced Materials and Structures and the Institute of Fundamental Technological Research of the Polish Academy of Sciences, Warsaw, Poland, Technical University Darmstadt, Germany, College of Engineering, Korea University (Seoul, S. Korea).

His main contributions are in the field of hydrodynamics, rheology, polymer science, and nanotechnology - covered, in part, in his monographs.[3][4][5][6][7]. He is an inventor of VivaDent® Aerosol Reduction Gel marketed by Ivoclar [8].
