= MEPE =

Protein-coding gene in the species Homo sapiens

Identifiers
- Aliases: MEPE, OF45, matrix extracellular phosphoglycoprotein
- External IDs: OMIM: 605912; MGI: 2137384; GeneCards: MEPE

Gene location (Human)
Chr.	Chromosome 4 (human)
Band	4q22.1	Start	87,821,398 bp
Band	4q22.1	End	87,846,814 bp

Gene location (Mouse)
Chr.	Chromosome 5 (mouse)
Band	5|5 E5	Start	104,473,195 bp
Band	5|5 E5	End	104,486,477 bp
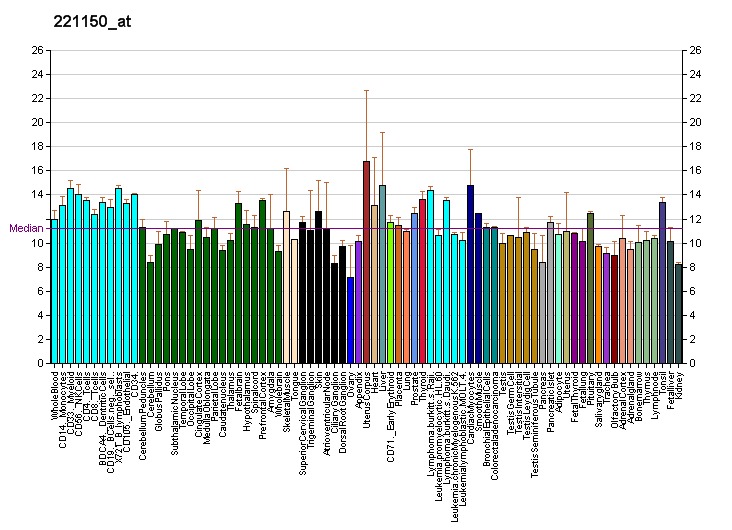
RNA expression pattern
Bgee	Human / Mouse (ortholog); Top expressed in: tibia; periodontal fiber; trabecular bone; cingulate gyrus; anterior cingulate cortex; Brodmann area 23; Brodmann area 9; prefrontal cortex; middle temporal gyrus; superior frontal gyrus / Top expressed in: body of femur; tibiofemoral joint; cochlea; fossa; vestibular labyrinth; vestibular sensory epithelium; efferent ductule; sexually immature organism; More reference expression data
BioGPS	More reference expression data
Gene ontology
Molecular function	extracellular matrix structural constituent; protein binding; extracellular matrix protein binding
Cellular component	extracellular region; endoplasmic reticulum lumen; extracellular matrix
Biological process	skeletal system development; biomineral tissue development; post-translational protein modification
Sources:Amigo / QuickGO
Orthologs
Databases	NCBI: entry; OMA: entry
Species	Human	Mouse
Entrez	56955	94111
Ensembl	ENSG00000152595	ENSMUSG00000053863
UniProt	Q9NQ76	Q8K4L6
RefSeq (mRNA)	NM_001184694; NM_001184695; NM_001184696; NM_001184697; NM_001291183 NM_020203	NM_053172
RefSeq (protein)	NP_001171623; NP_001171624; NP_001171625; NP_001171626; NP_001278112 NP_064588	NP_444402
Location (UCSC)	Chr 4: 87.82 – 87.85 Mb	Chr 5: 104.47 – 104.49 Mb
PubMed search
- Wikidata
View/Edit Human	View/Edit Mouse

Osteoregulin

Identifiers
- Symbol: Osteoregulin
- Pfam: PF07175
- InterPro: IPR009837
Available protein structures:
- PDB: IPR009837 PF07175 (ECOD; PDBsum)
- AlphaFold: IPR009837; PF07175

Matrix extracellular phosphoglycoprotein (Osteoblast/osteocyte factor 45) is a protein that in humans is encoded by the MEPE gene. A conserved RGD motif is found in this protein, and this is potentially involved in integrin recognition.
