= List of Ayurvedic colleges =

Ayurveda colleges and higher-education institutions in India

This is a list of notable colleges, universities and national institutes in India that provide higher education in Ayurveda. The National Commission for Indian System of Medicine (NCISM) is the statutory body responsible for standards in Indian-system medical education and publishes lists of permitted Ayurveda colleges.

== Assam ==
- Government Ayurvedic College, Guwahati

== Delhi ==
- All India Institute of Ayurveda
- Ayurvedic and Unani Tibbia College
- Chaudhary Brahm Prakash Ayurved Charak Sansthan

== Gujarat ==
- Gujarat Ayurved University, Jamnagar
- Institute of Teaching and Research in Ayurveda, Jamnagar

== Haryana ==
- Baba Mastnath University, Rohtak

== Karnataka ==
- Government Ayurveda Medical College and Hospital, Mysore

== Kerala ==
- Government Ayurveda Medical College Kannur, Pariyaram
- Vaidyaratnam Ayurveda College, Thrissur

== Madhya Pradesh ==
- Devi Ahilya Vishwavidyalaya, Indore

== Meghalaya ==
- North Eastern Institute of Ayurveda and Homeopathy, Shillong

== Rajasthan ==
- Dr. Sarvepalli Radhakrishnan Rajasthan Ayurved University, Jodhpur
- National Institute of Ayurveda, Jaipur

== Uttar Pradesh ==
- Banaras Hindu University, Varanasi

== Uttarakhand ==
- Uttarakhand Ayurved University, Dehradun

== West Bengal ==
- J.B. Roy State Ayurvedic Medical College and Hospital, Kolkata
