= Jamini Bhushan Ray =

Indian physician

- যামিনী ভূষণ রায়
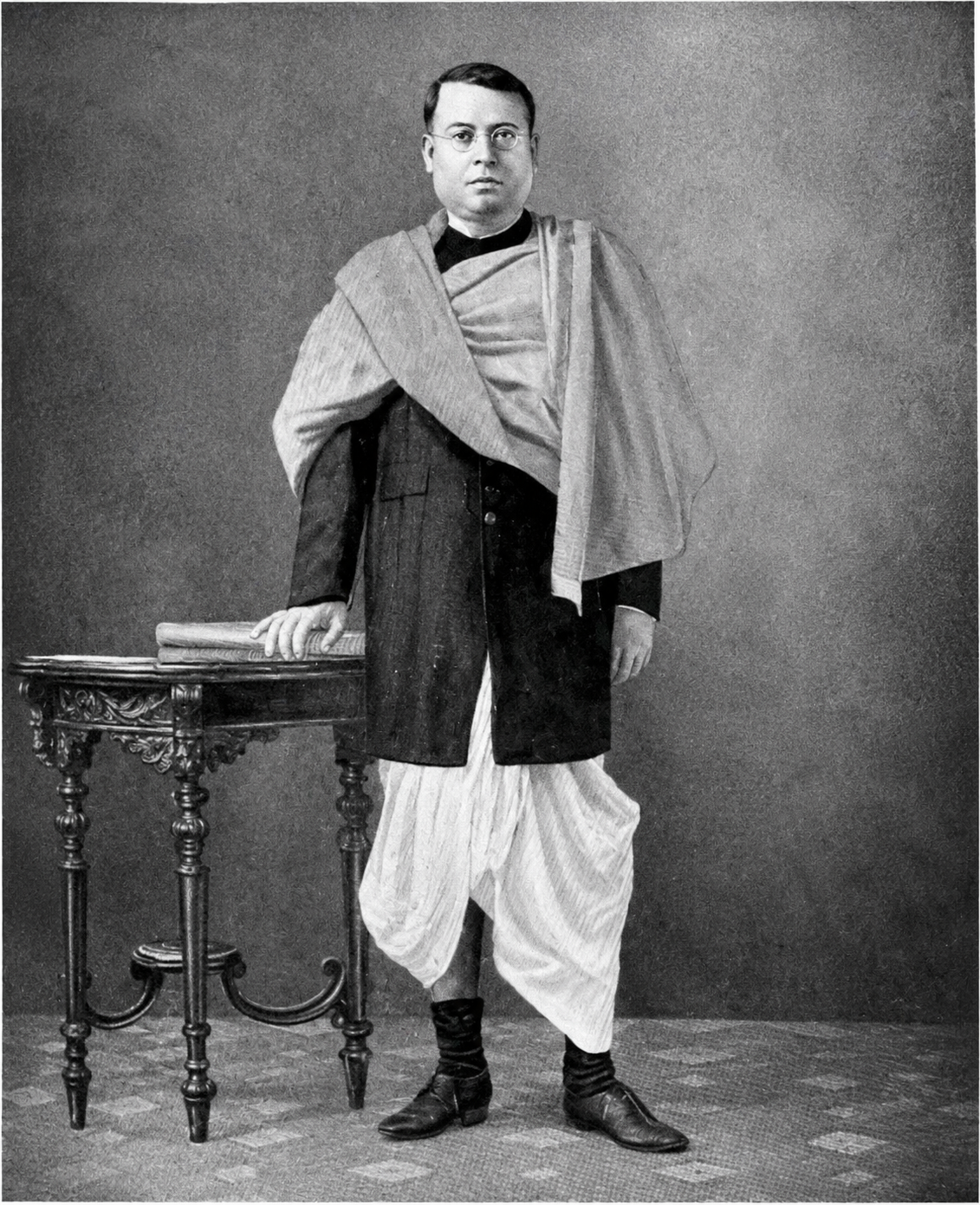
- Portrait of Ray
- Born: 1 July 1879; Khulna, Bengal Presidency, British India
- Died: 11 August 1926 (aged 47); Calcutta, Bengal Presidency, British India
- Education: Sanskrit College, Calcutta; Calcutta Medical College
- Occupations: Ayurvedic physician Medical educator Sanskrit scholar
- Known for: Founding the Ashtanga Ayurveda College and Hospital; Modernising Ayurvedic education in Bengal
- Spouse: Saroj Bala Devi
- Children: 6
- Website: jbray.org

Jamini Bhushan Ray (Bengali: যামিনী ভূষণ রায়; 1 July 1879 (17 Asharh 1286 BS) – 11 August 1926 (26 Srabon 1333 BS)) was an Indian Ayurvedic physician, Sanskrit scholar, educator, and philanthropist. He founded the Ashtanga Ayurveda College and Hospital in Calcutta in 1916 and established the Vaidyaraj Pharmacy, both of which formed part of his efforts to modernise Ayurvedic education and pharmaceutical practice during the late colonial period. Contemporary scholarship identifies him as an important figure in the revival of Ayurveda in Bengal through the development of educational institutions, pharmaceutical enterprises and professional organisations.

Trained in both Sanskrit scholarship and Western medicine, Ray advocated the systematic study of Ayurveda and promoted formal education, clinical training and scholarly publication alongside its classical traditions.

== Early life and education ==
Ray was born in Poyogram village in the Khulna District of the Bengal Presidency, then part of British India (now Bangladesh). He was the son of the Ayurvedic physician Panchanan Ray, who was known by the honorific title Kavichintamani. After receiving his early education in his native village, he moved to Calcutta for higher studies and attended South Suburban School in Bhowanipore. While attending the school, he lived in a rented house in the neighbourhood.

Ray studied at Sanskrit College, Calcutta, where he earned a B.A. degree in Sanskrit. While pursuing an M.A. degree in Sanskrit and medical studies at Calcutta Medical College, he continued to study Ayurveda under his father, Kaviraj Panchanan Ray.

Ray obtained an M.A. degree in Sanskrit, for which he received a medal. He graduated with a Bachelor of Medicine (M.B.) degree in 1905 and was awarded a gold medal. Following graduation, he practised obstetrics and gynaecology before devoting himself entirely to Ayurveda. Although he had opportunities to enter government medical service under the British administration, Ray declined them in favour of practising Ayurveda.

Ray completed his Ayurvedic training under Mahamahopadhyay Bijoy Ratna Sen and subsequently served as Kaviraj at the Bowbazar Marwari Hospital.

== Vaidyaraj Pharmacy and standardisation of Ayurvedic medicine ==
Among Ray's institutional initiatives was the establishment of the Vaidyaraj Pharmacy. Located at 46 Beadon Street in Calcutta, the enterprise manufactured and distributed Ayurvedic medicines using systematic methods of preparation and quality control.

Such initiatives formed part of the broader institutionalisation and modernisation of Ayurveda during the colonial period. Through pharmaceutical production, standardisation of formulations and dissemination of Ayurvedic literature, Ray and other reformers sought to place Ayurveda within increasingly organised educational and clinical settings.

Medicines produced by the pharmacy were also distributed free of charge to poor patients.

== Founder of Ashtanga Ayurveda College ==
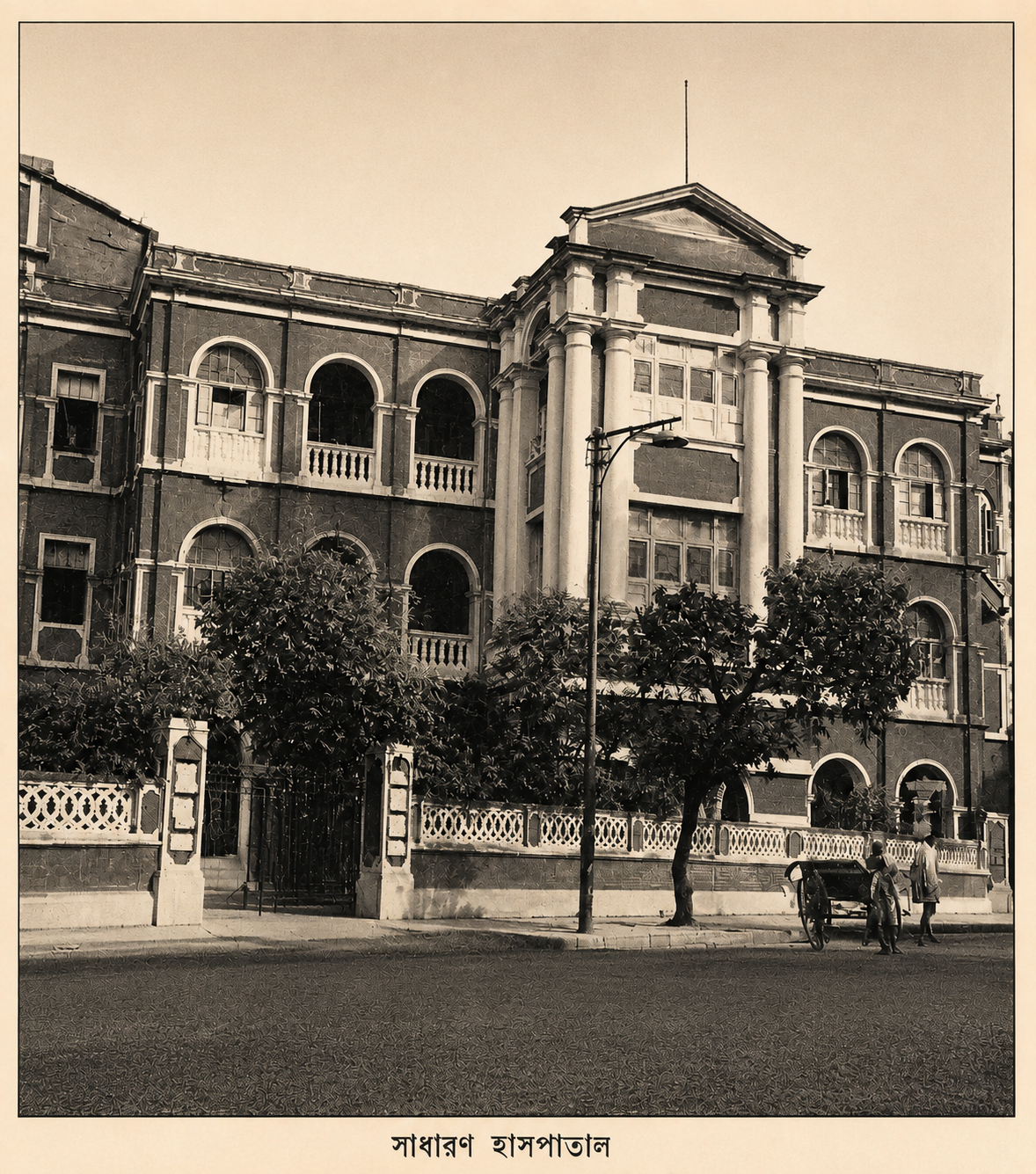
Historic view of the Raja Dinendra Street campus of Ashtanga Ayurveda College and Hospital, Kolkata, in 1964.

In 1916, Ray founded the Ashtanga Ayurveda College and Hospital in Calcutta. Initially established in a rented house at 29 Fariapukur Street in north Calcutta, the college admitted twelve students in its first intake. Tuition, board and lodging were provided without charge.

Ray sought to place Ayurvedic education within an organised collegiate setting, with specialist instructors and systematic teaching. The curriculum provided instruction in all eight classical branches of Ayurveda (Ashtanga), together with practical clinical training through an attached teaching hospital. Ray served as the institution's first principal, with Biraja Charan Gupta as vice-principal.

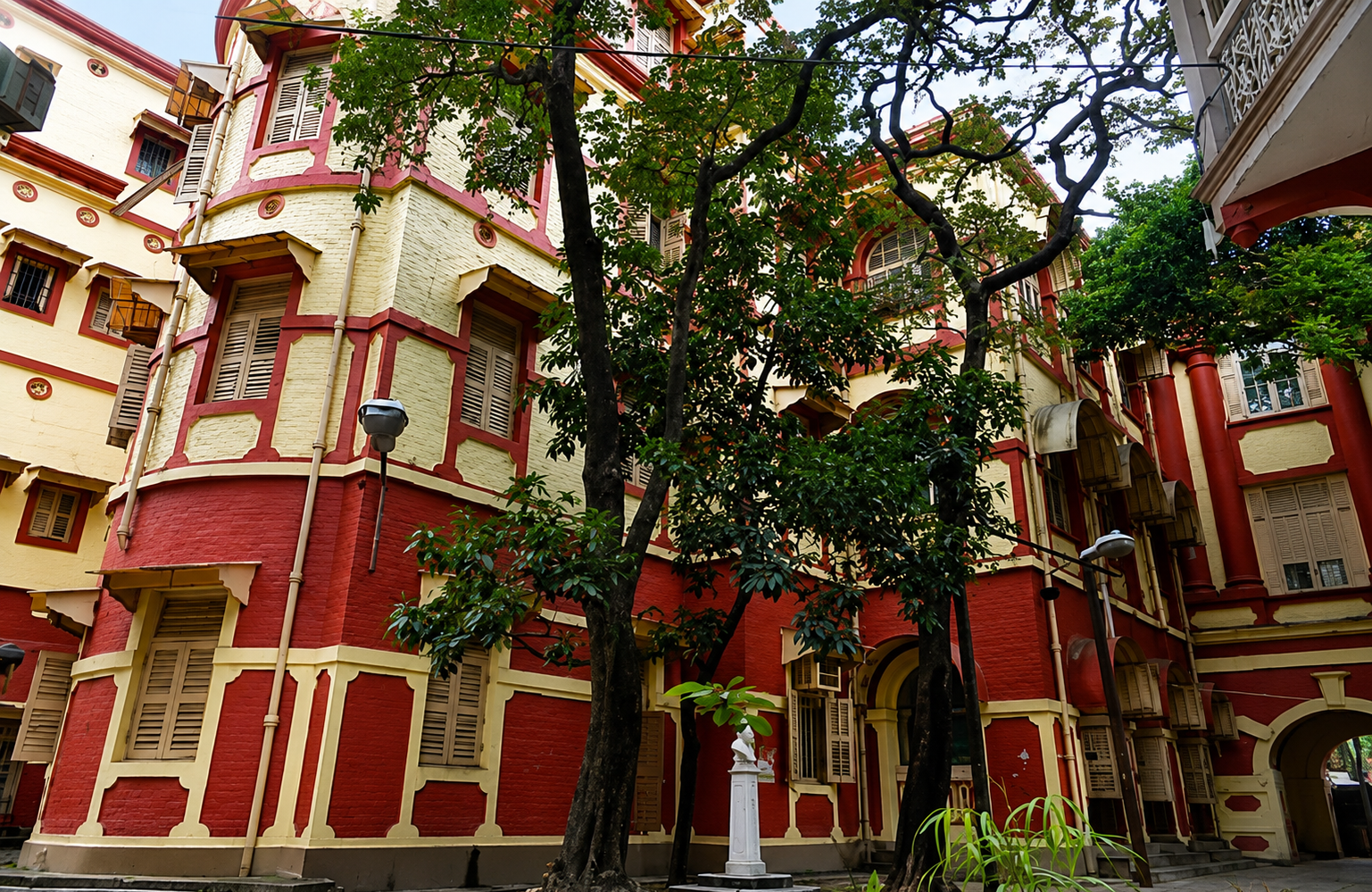
Present-day view of the Raja Dinendra Street campus of the J.B. Roy State Ayurvedic Medical College and Hospital, which evolved from the Ashtanga Ayurveda Vidyalaya o Ayurvediya Arogyashala founded by Jamini Bhushan Ray in 1916.

An outpatient dispensary was established alongside the college and soon treated about 100 patients daily. The institution also provided free medical treatment to poor patients, with Ray reportedly attending daily to treat them.

Ray introduced practical instruction in subjects including surgery, obstetrics, toxicology and medical jurisprudence alongside the classical Ayurvedic curriculum.

The institution was subsequently registered as a public institution and placed under an executive committee; its first executive committee dates from 1919, with Krishna Das Bandyopadhyay serving as secretary.

The institution later evolved into the J.B. Roy State Ayurvedic Medical College and Hospital. A Bengali biographical dictionary records its historical name as Jamini Bhushan Ashtanga Ayurveda Vidyalaya o Ayurvediya Arogyashala.

== Presidency of the All India Ayurvedic Conference ==
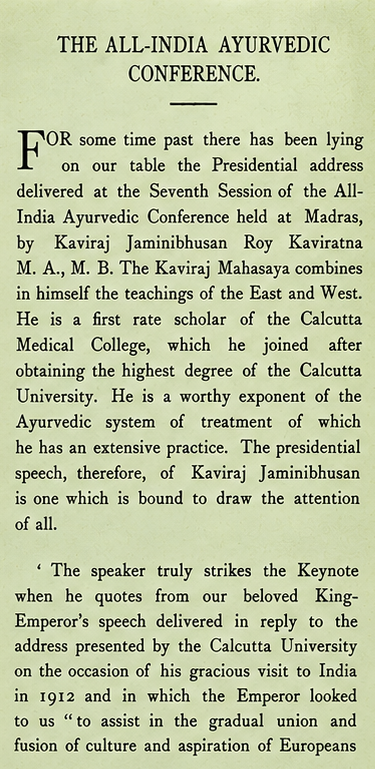
Opening panel of the restored Behar Herald report on the 1915 Seventh All-India Ayurvedic Conference. Click to view the complete four-panel reading edition.

In 1915 Ray was elected president of the Seventh All India Ayurvedic Conference held in Madras (now Chennai).

Contemporary commentary on Ray's presidential address described him as combining the medical traditions of East and West and praised his efforts to reconcile classical Ayurvedic learning with modern scientific medicine.

Ray emphasised collective rather than individual efforts for the advancement of Ayurveda. He presented the conference as evidence of a wider revival of interest in indigenous medicine and urged that Ayurveda be developed in a "truly scientific spirit".

In his presidential address, Ray advocated preserving Ayurveda's classical foundations while strengthening scientific education, including the study of anatomy, dissection, surgery and clinical practice.

== Evidence before the Madras Committee on Indigenous Systems of Medicine ==
During the 1921–1923 inquiry of the Madras Presidency's Committee on the Indigenous Systems of Medicine, Ray submitted written evidence and was interviewed in Calcutta by its touring subcommittee. The subcommittee also inspected the Ashtanga Ayurvedic College. The report identified Ray and Gananath Sen as practitioners proficient in both Ayurveda and Western medicine and drew on their evidence in its discussion of diagnosis and treatment.

In his evidence, Ray attributed the decline of Ayurvedic surgery partly to the inaccessibility of Sanskrit medical texts and the scarcity of competent teachers, but maintained that the discipline could be revived through research and systematic investigation. He described Ayurvedic diagnosis as combining observation through the senses and patient interrogation with consideration of a patient's constitution, environment, season and the progression of disease.

== Association with Mahatma Gandhi ==
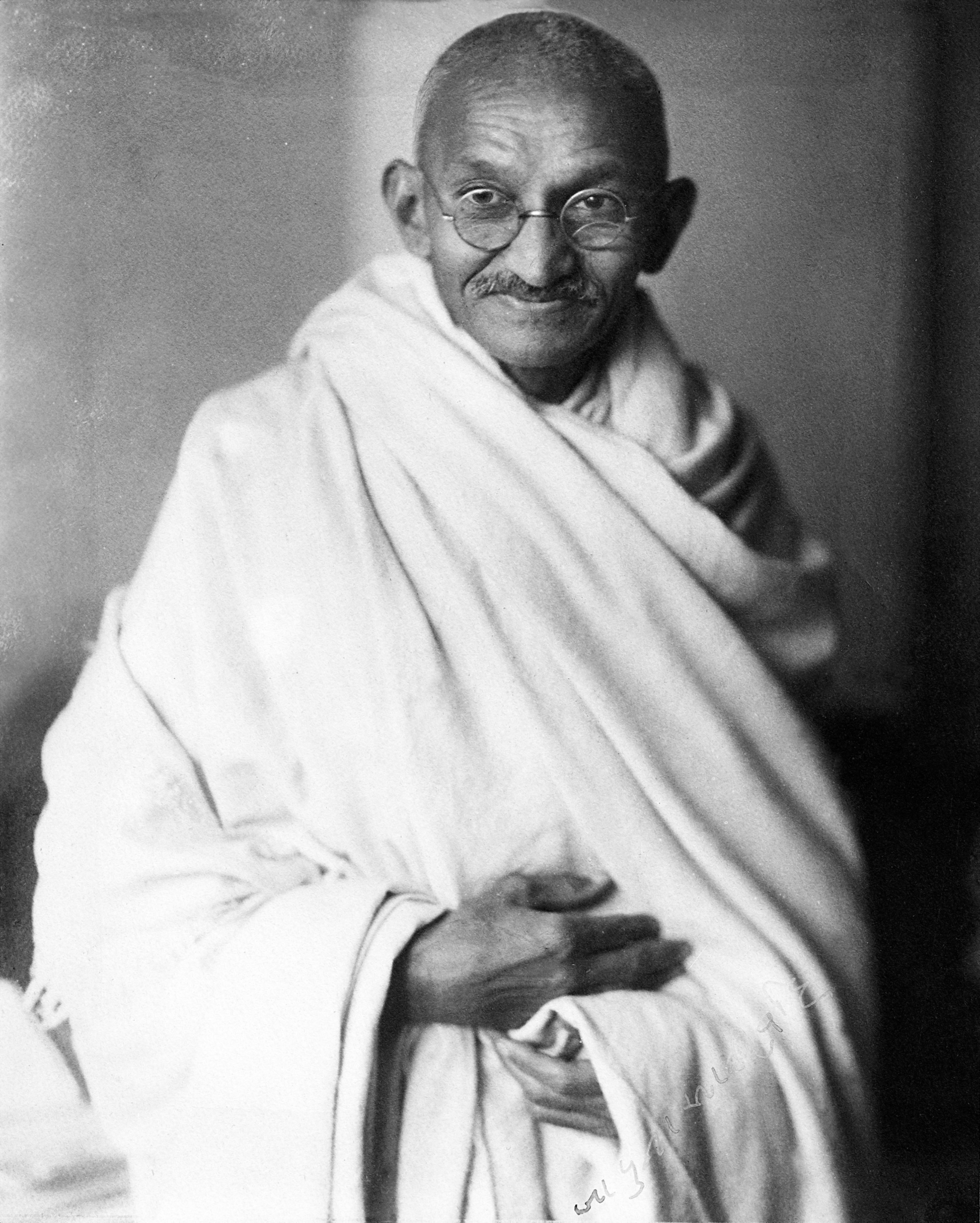
Mahatma Gandhi, who laid the foundation stone of the Ashtanga Ayurveda College and Hospital on 6 May 1925.

On 6 May 1925, Mahatma Gandhi laid the foundation stone of the new building of the Ashtanga Ayurveda Vidyalaya in Calcutta.

In his address, Gandhi called for greater humility, honesty and scientific inquiry among Ayurvedic and Unani practitioners. He criticised exaggerated medical claims and objectionable advertising by practitioners of indigenous medicine, while describing the Vidyalaya itself as a "noble institution".

Scholar Shambhu Prasad places the address within Gandhi's broader attempt to reform Ayurveda from within, arguing that Gandhi sought greater honesty, humility and research among Ayurvedic practitioners rather than rejection of the tradition itself.

== Philanthropy ==
Ray provided substantial financial and property support to the Ashtanga Ayurveda College and Hospital. According to a biographical account by M. N. Pal published in the institution's 1964 commemorative volume, Ray contributed ₹70,000 towards the construction of its buildings.

Before his death in August 1926, Ray also bequeathed property to the institution in his will. The bequests comprised thirteen cottahs of land at Ballygunge, six cottahs on Grey Street, twelve bighas at Patipukur together with his garden house there, and health recovery houses at Kurseong and Ranchi.

The Patipukur property subsequently became the site of a tuberculosis hospital attached to the institution. A separate commemorative history records that Bidhan Chandra Roy laid the foundation stone of the tuberculosis hospital in 1933.

Separately, Samsad Bangali Charitabhidhan records that Ray donated ₹200,000 towards Ashtanga Ayurveda Vidyalaya on the day before his death.

== Publications and scholarship ==
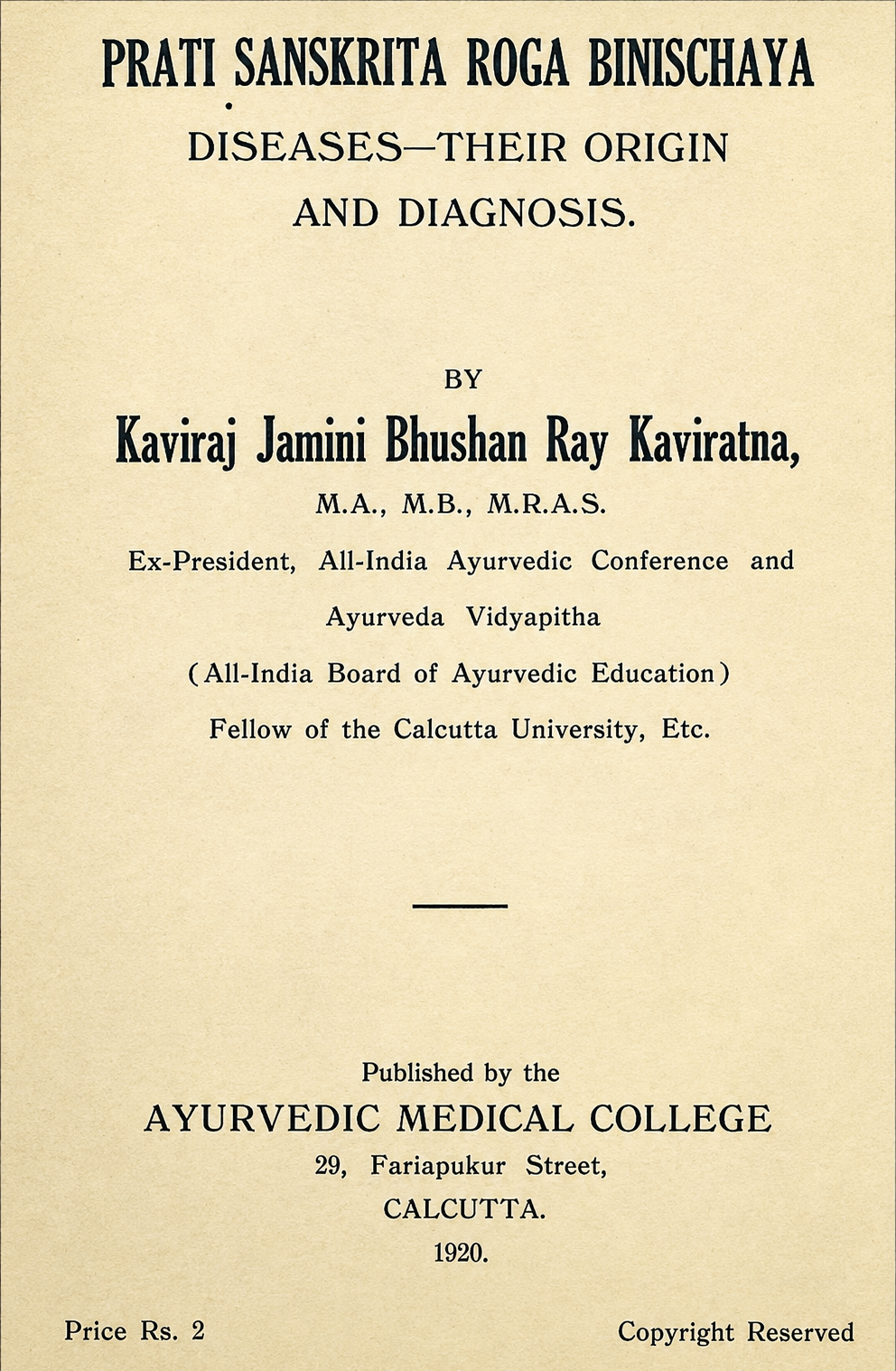
Title page of Prati Sanskrita Roga Binischaya (Diseases – Their Origin and Diagnosis), published in Calcutta in 1920.

Ray was a Sanskrit scholar and author whose medical writings covered diagnosis, diseases of the ear, nose and throat, paediatrics, obstetrics and toxicology.

Ray was elected a Fellow of the University of Calcutta, served as an examiner for Banaras Hindu University and other universities and educational boards, and was a member of the Royal Asiatic Society.

The 1923 report of the Madras Committee on Indigenous Systems of Medicine listed five Sanskrit works by Ray among Ayurvedic texts then commonly used as textbooks: Roga Vinischayah, Kumaratantram, Vishatantram, Prasutitantram and Shalakyatantram.

Among his published works were:

- Roga Vinischaya (diagnosis), published in an edition titled Prati Sanskrita Roga Binischaya (Diseases – Their Origin and Diagnosis). A profile published by the Central Council for Research in Ayurvedic Sciences (CCRAS) describes the work as addressing gaps in classical descriptions of diseases that could present difficulties in their clinical application.
- Shalakyatantram, on diseases of the ear, nose, throat and mouth.
- Kumaratantram, on children's diseases.
- Prasutitantram, on obstetrics.
- Vishatantram, on toxicology; an English-language work was published as A Manual of Toxicology.

The title page of Ray's 1920 Prati Sanskrita Roga Binischaya identifies the Ayurvedic Medical College at 29 Fariapukur Street as its publisher.

Ray also published a Bengali work titled Swastha Niti and was involved in publishing the Bengali monthly journal Ayurveda, which disseminated information about Ayurveda and other medical subjects. According to CCRAS, the journal was published under the editorial guidance of Kaviraj Srivirajcharan Gupta Kavibhushan, with Ray serving as co-editor.

== Influence beyond Bengal ==
The Ashtanga Ayurveda College attracted students from beyond Bengal. M. N. Pal's 1964 biographical account of Ray records that pupils came from different parts of India as well as Nepal and Ceylon (now Sri Lanka) to study at the institution.

Among the students associated with the college was the Sri Lankan Ayurvedic physician G. P. Wickramarachchi, who studied there during the early twentieth century. He later played a prominent role in the development of Ayurvedic education in Sri Lanka.

== Personal life ==
Ray was married to Saroj Bala Devi, with whom he had six children. According to the CCRAS biographical profile, two of his youngest sons died while still in their late teens.

His surviving sons Bijoy Bhushan and Amar Bhushan later practised Ayurvedic medicine at the institution founded by their father. Amar Bhushan Ray subsequently served as superintendent of the Patipukur Tuberculosis Hospital, which had been established on land bequeathed by his father.

== Death and legacy ==
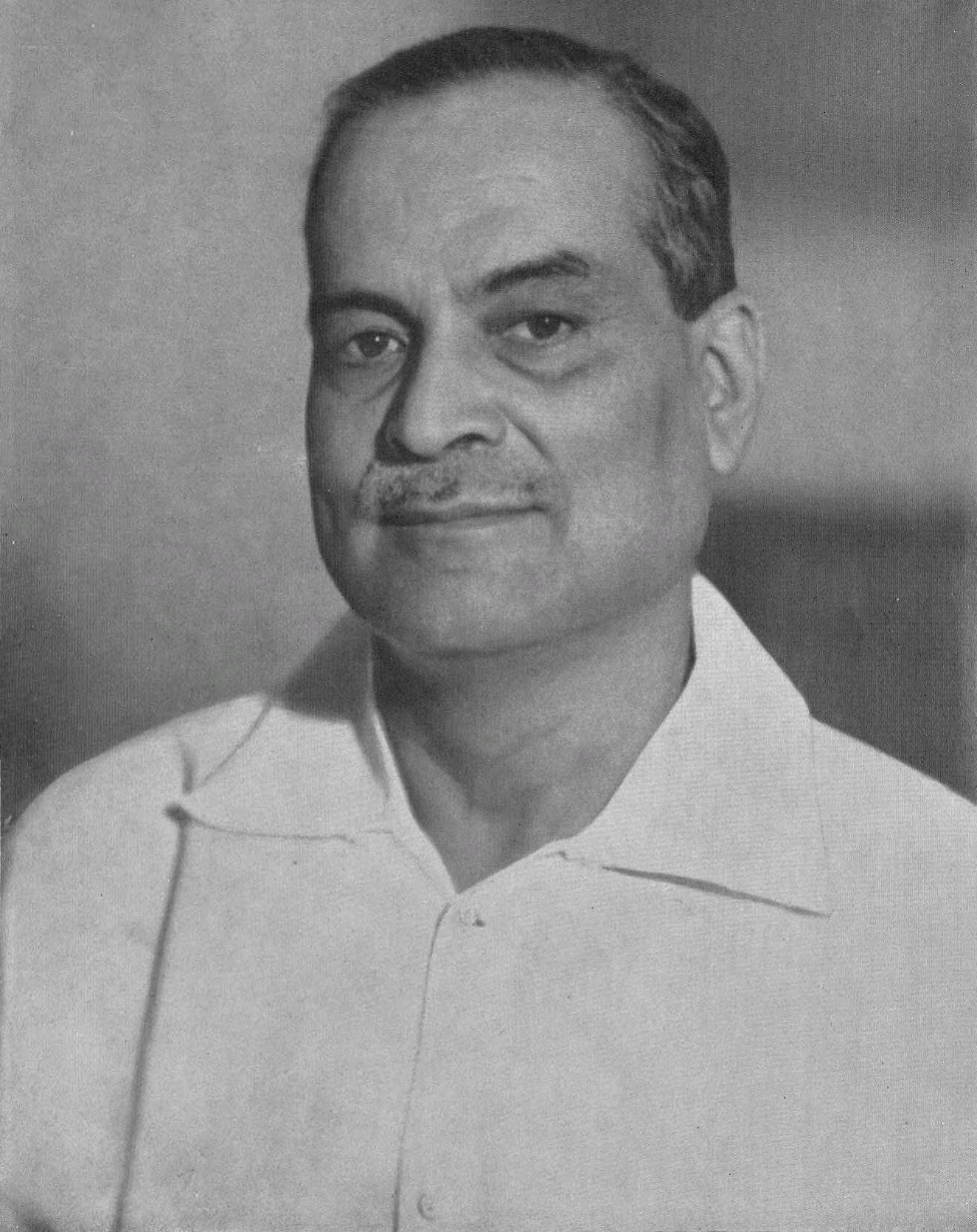
Dr. Bidhan Chandra Roy, who laid the foundation stone of the Patipukur Tuberculosis Hospital on land bequeathed by Jamini Bhushan Ray.

Ray died in Calcutta on 11 August 1926 at the age of forty-seven.

Modern scholarship emphasises Ray's role in the institutional development of Ayurveda in Bengal through his educational and pharmaceutical initiatives. The institution he founded continues as the J.B. Roy State Ayurvedic Medical College and Hospital. CCRAS also includes Ray in its biographical series on luminaries of Ayurveda.

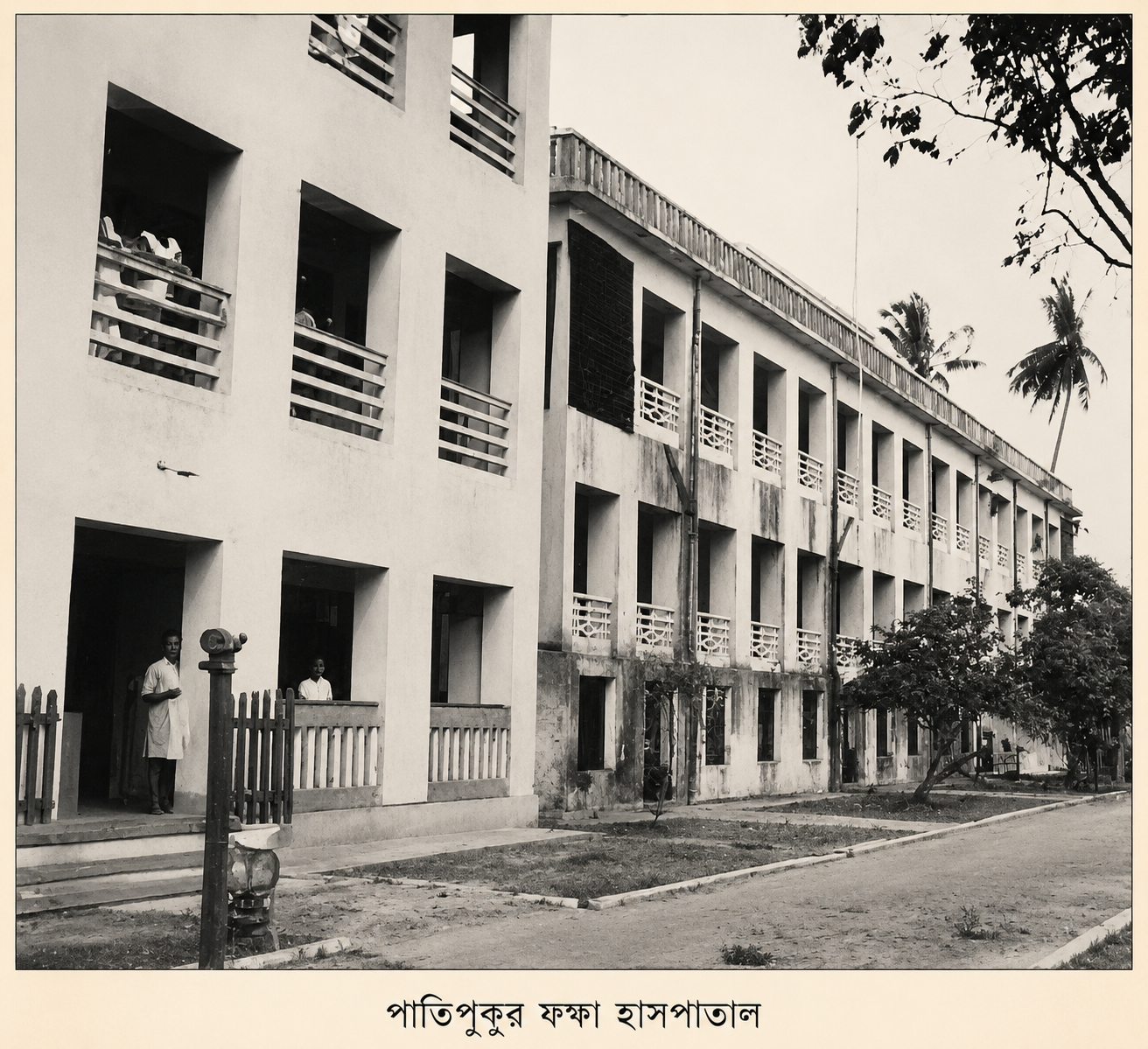
Historic view of Patipukur T.B. Hospital, later reorganised as Patipukur Ayurvedic Hospital, in 1964.

Ray's bequest of twelve bighas of land at Patipukur, together with his garden house there, subsequently provided the site for a tuberculosis hospital attached to the institution. Bidhan Chandra Roy laid the foundation stone of the tuberculosis hospital in 1933. According to the Central Council for Research in Ayurvedic Sciences, it was initially established as a 60-bed facility.

The hospital was later reorganised as Patipukur Ayurvedic Hospital. The college's hospital profile describes it as a 94-bed facility associated with the J.B. Roy State Ayurvedic Medical College and Hospital.

== Recognition ==
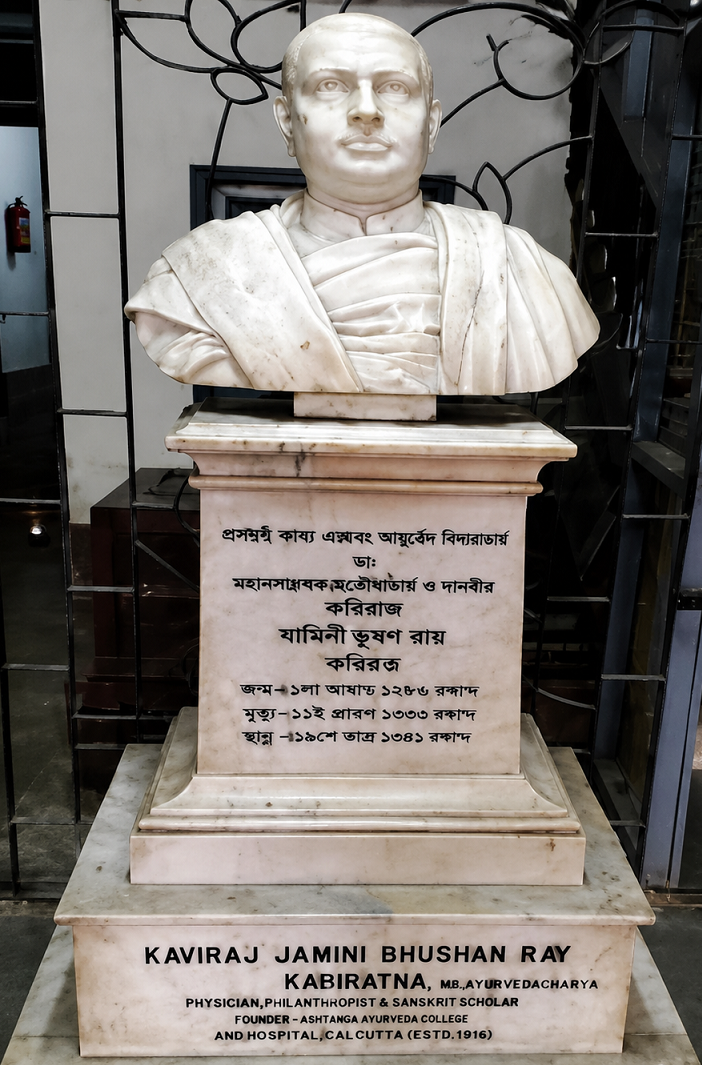
Marble bust of Ayurvedic physician and medical educator Jamini Bhushan Ray at the J.B. Roy State Ayurvedic Medical College and Hospital in Kolkata.

A street in Kolkata, Jamini Kaviraj Row, was named in Ray's honour.

The Ministry of AYUSH commemorated Ray's birth anniversary through official social-media posts in 2021, 2022, 2025 and 2026.

The Central Council for Research in Ayurvedic Sciences (CCRAS) includes Ray in its Documentation of Life Profiles of Luminaries in the Field of Ayurveda initiative and hosts a biographical profile of him as part of its Luminaries of Ayurveda collection.

== See also ==
- Ayurveda
- Swadeshi movement
- Gananath Sen
- Vaidyaratnam P. S. Varier
- Hakim Ajmal Khan
