= J.B. Roy State Ayurvedic Medical College and Hospital =

Ayurvedic medical college and hospital in Kolkata, India

J. B. Roy State Ayurvedic Medical College and Hospital
- যামিনী ভূষণ অষ্টাঙ্গ আয়ুর্বেদ বিদ্যালয় ও আয়ুর্বেদীয় আরোগ্যশালা
- College logo
- Former names: Ashtanga Ayurveda College and Hospital; Jamini Bhushan Ashtanga Ayurveda Vidyalaya and Ayurvediya Arogyashala
- Type: Public Ayurvedic medical college and teaching hospital
- Established: 10 February 1916; 110 years ago
- Founder: Jamini Bhushan Ray
- Affiliations: West Bengal University of Health Sciences
- Academic affiliations: National Commission for Indian System of Medicine
- Location: 170–172 Raja Dinendra Street, Shyambazar, Kolkata, West Bengal, India; 22°35′53″N 88°22′39″E
- Campus: Urban
- Website: jbrsamch.org.in

J. B. Roy State Ayurvedic Medical College and Hospital is a public Ayurvedic medical college and teaching hospital in Kolkata, West Bengal, India. It was founded in 1916 by Ayurvedic physician, Sanskrit scholar and philanthropist Jamini Bhushan Ray as the Ashtanga Ayurveda Vidyalaya. The college is affiliated with the West Bengal University of Health Sciences and recognised by the National Commission for Indian System of Medicine.

The institution was established as part of efforts to introduce organised teaching, clinical training and public medical service into Ayurvedic education in Bengal. It moved to its present Raja Dinendra Street campus after Mahatma Gandhi laid the foundation stone of the new building in 1925. In 1964, the college, its teaching hospital and the associated Patipukur hospital were transferred from private trust management to the Government of West Bengal.

One of India's oldest surviving Ayurvedic medical colleges, the institution became an early centre of organised Ayurvedic education in Bengal. It offers the Bachelor of Ayurveda, Medicine and Surgery degree and operates teaching hospitals at Raja Dinendra Street and Patipukur. Its development was shaped by figures including Sir Ashutosh Mukherjee, Gananath Sen, Mahatma Gandhi, Shyama Prasad Mukherjee, Sarvepalli Radhakrishnan and Bidhan Chandra Roy.

== History ==
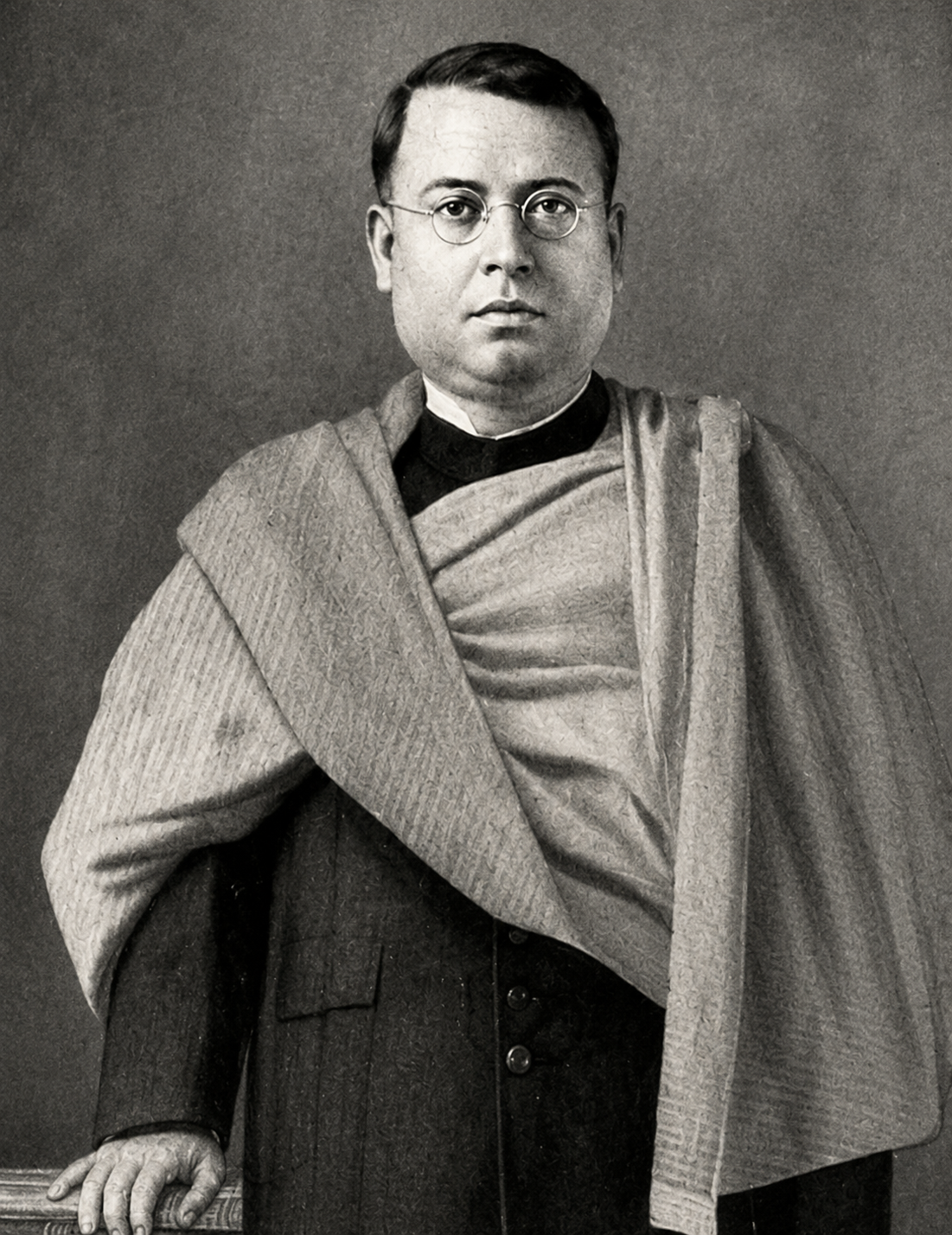
Jamini Bhushan Ray, founder of the institution

The institution was founded on 10 February 1916 by Jamini Bhushan Ray, a physician trained in both Ayurveda and Western medicine. It was formally inaugurated on 14 April 1916 (1 Baishakh 1323 BS) as the Ashtanga Ayurveda Vidyalaya in a rented house at 29 Fariapukur Street in north Calcutta. The college opened with twelve students; Ray served as Principal, Biraja Charan Gupta as Vice-Principal and Surendranath Kumar Das as professor. Tuition, board and lodging were provided without charge.

Later institutional accounts described Ray's educational model as moving Ayurvedic instruction from the traditional guru–shishya setting into an organised college, with specialist teachers for the eight branches of Ayurveda and practical clinical training through an attached hospital. M. N. Pal's 1964 account similarly described the institution as teaching ancient Indian medicine alongside contemporary scientific knowledge.

The college attracted students from different parts of India as well as from Nepal and Ceylon (present-day Sri Lanka). Together with Gananath Sen, Ray prepared a combined syllabus for the students of Ashtanga Ayurveda Vidyalaya and enlisted both Ayurvedic physicians and Western-trained doctors in the institution's teaching programme.

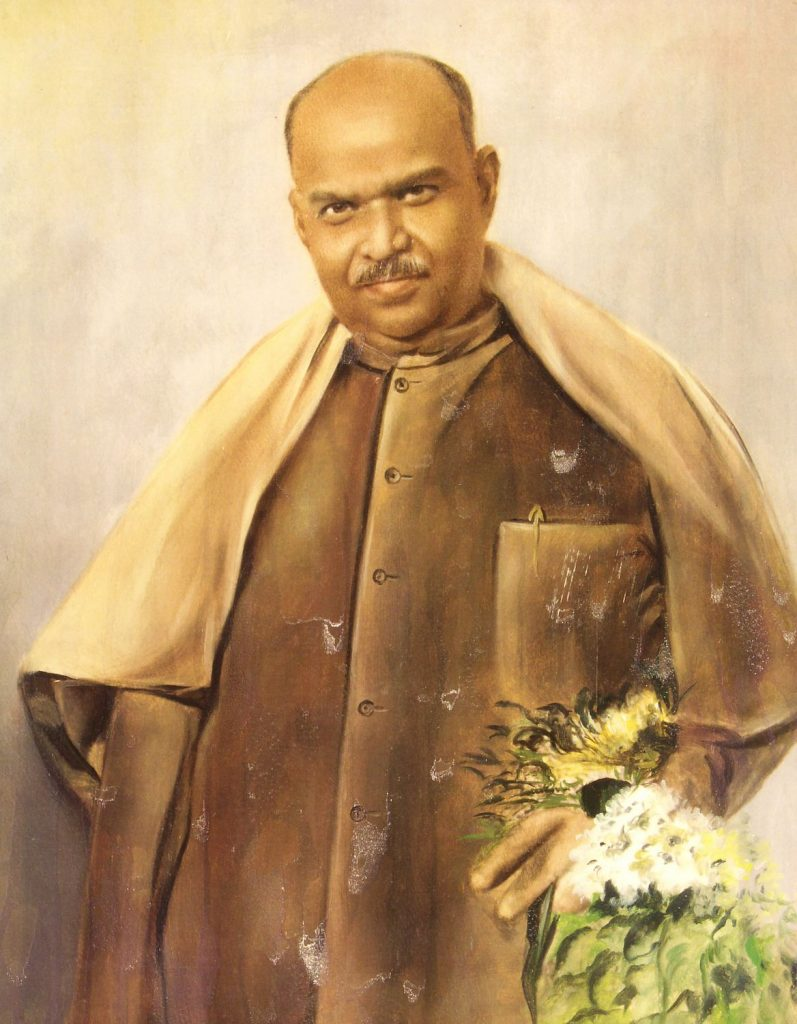
Dr. Shyama Prasad Mukherjee, former Chairman of the Board of Trustees

In 1919, the institution was reorganised with a Board of Trustees and an Executive Council. Sir Ashutosh Mukherjee served as the first Chairman of the Board of Trustees, a position later held by his son, Shyama Prasad Mukherjee. Gananath Sen chaired the first Executive Council, while Jamini Bhushan Ray continued to serve as Principal.

By this period, the attached charitable dispensary was reportedly treating about 100 outpatients daily. As the Fariapukur premises no longer provided sufficient space for both the college and dispensary, the institution relocated in 1921 to larger premises on Shyamabazar Bridge Road (now R. G. Kar Road).

During the inquiry of the Madras Government's Committee on the Indigenous Systems of Medicine (1921–1923), a touring subcommittee inspected the Ashtanga Ayurveda College while collecting evidence on indigenous medical education. Ray also submitted written evidence and was interviewed by the committee in Calcutta. The committee subsequently drew on the evidence of Ray and Gananath Sen in its discussions of indigenous medical education, diagnosis and treatment.

== Foundation stone ceremony (1925) ==
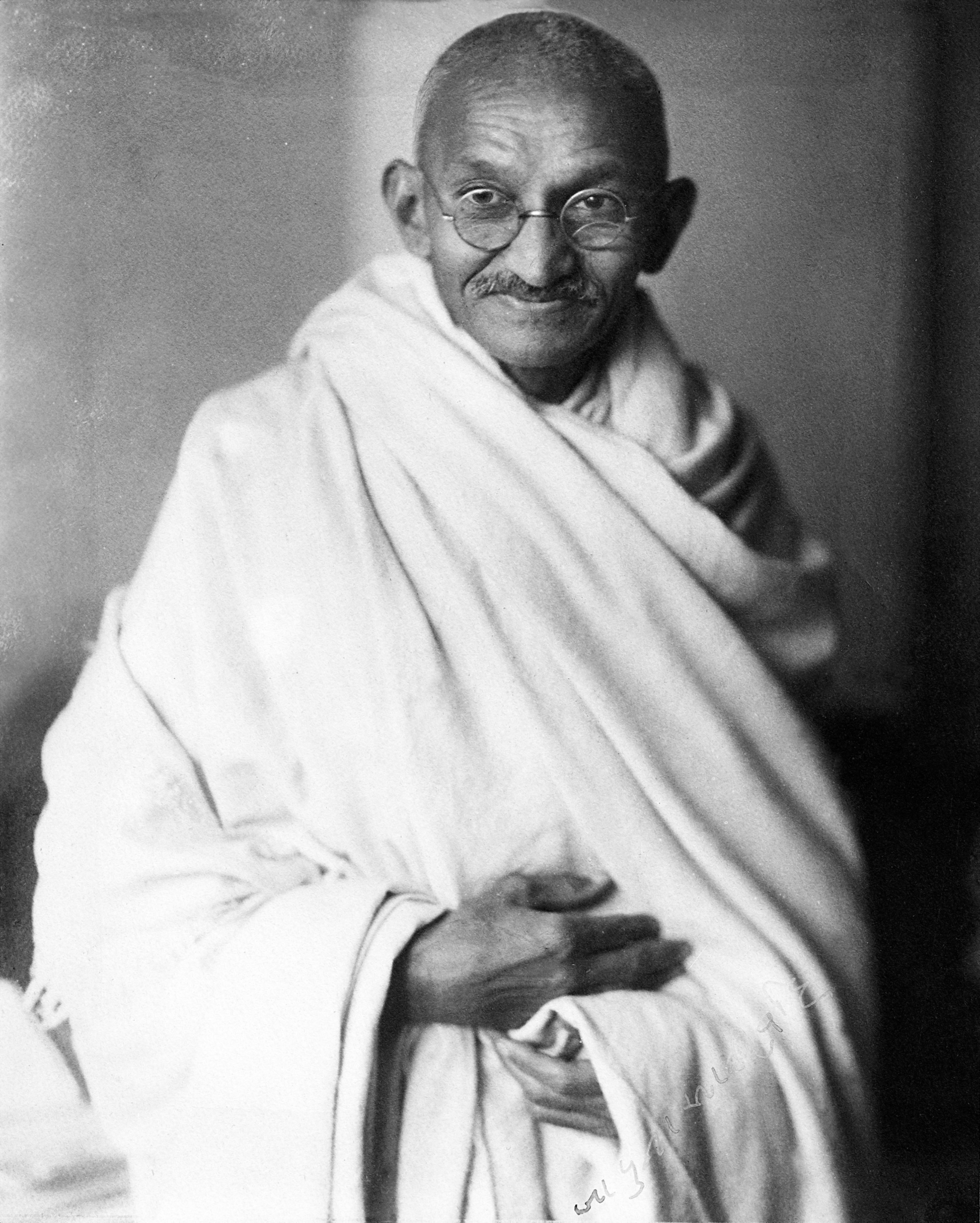
Mahatma Gandhi, who laid the foundation stone of the institution's Raja Dinendra Street building on 6 May 1925

On 6 May 1925, Mahatma Gandhi laid the foundation stone of the institution's new building on Raja Dinendra Street.

In his address at the ceremony, Gandhi criticised exaggerated medical claims and objectionable advertising by some practitioners of Ayurveda and Unani medicine. He called for greater humility, honesty and scientific inquiry among practitioners, while describing the Vidyalaya itself as a "noble institution" and wishing it success. Scholar Shambhu Prasad has interpreted the address as part of Gandhi's effort to encourage reform within Ayurveda, rather than as a rejection of the medical tradition itself.

The institution's 1964 commemorative history later recalled the foundation-stone ceremony as part of its early development and attributed Gandhi's participation to what it called the "practical idealism" of Jamini Bhushan Ray. A 2024 study of Ray likewise places the ceremony within the broader development of the institution and the organisation of Ayurvedic education in Bengal.

== Development and state takeover ==
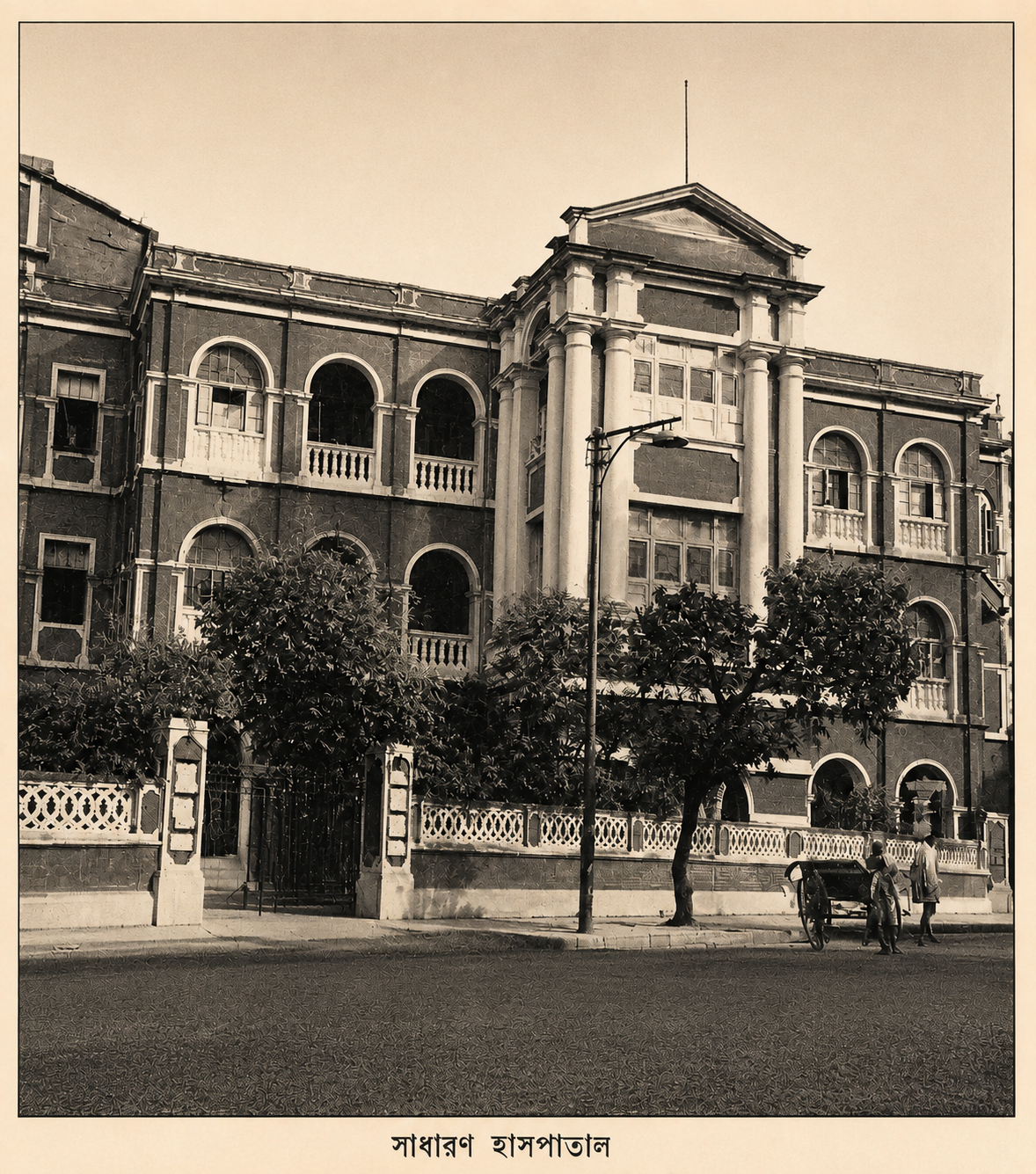
Historic view of the Raja Dinendra Street campus of Ashtanga Ayurveda Hospital, Kolkata.

Following the 1925 foundation stone ceremony, construction began on the permanent Raja Dinendra Street campus on land leased by the Calcutta Corporation for ninety-nine years. Although Jamini Bhushan Ray died in 1926 before its completion, the new hospital building with fifty charitable beds was formally inaugurated by Deshapriya Jatindra Mohan Sengupta in June 1927. Over the following decades, the institution expanded under successive Boards of Trustees before entering a new phase of development under government administration.

During the chairmanship of Sir Manmatha Nath Mukherjee, the institution continued to expand its hospital facilities. Nellie Sengupta, the English-born Indian freedom fighter and social worker, inaugurated the hospital's separate female ward. The institution's Silver Jubilee celebrations in 1941 were presided over by philosopher and statesman Sarvepalli Radhakrishnan, who later became the second President of India.

Before the creation of modern statutory bodies for Ayurvedic education, the institution conferred qualifications such as L.A.M.S. (Licentiate in Ayurvedic Medicine and Surgery) and Vishagratna. In 1937 it came under the General Council and State Faculty of Ayurvedic Medicine, Bengal, which was succeeded by the Paschim Banga Ayurveda Parishad in 1961.

By the early 1960s, however, the Trust Board faced increasing financial pressures in maintaining the expanding college, hospital and associated charitable services. Following discussions with the Government of West Bengal, an agreement was reached in 1964 under which the institution was transferred to state administration, ensuring its continued development as a public teaching hospital. Former Calcutta High Court judge and Vice-Chancellor of Calcutta University, Charu Chandra Biswas, helped facilitate the negotiations leading to the transfer.

The management and maintenance of the institution, then known as Jamini Bhushan Ashtanga Ayurveda Vidyalaya, together with Patipukur T.B. Hospital, were transferred to the Government of West Bengal with effect from 1 August 1964. The transfer marked the institution's transition from a privately managed charitable trust to a State Ayurvedic College and Hospital. Governor Padmaja Naidu and Chief Minister Prafulla Chandra Sen participated in the commemorative ceremonies marking the transition.

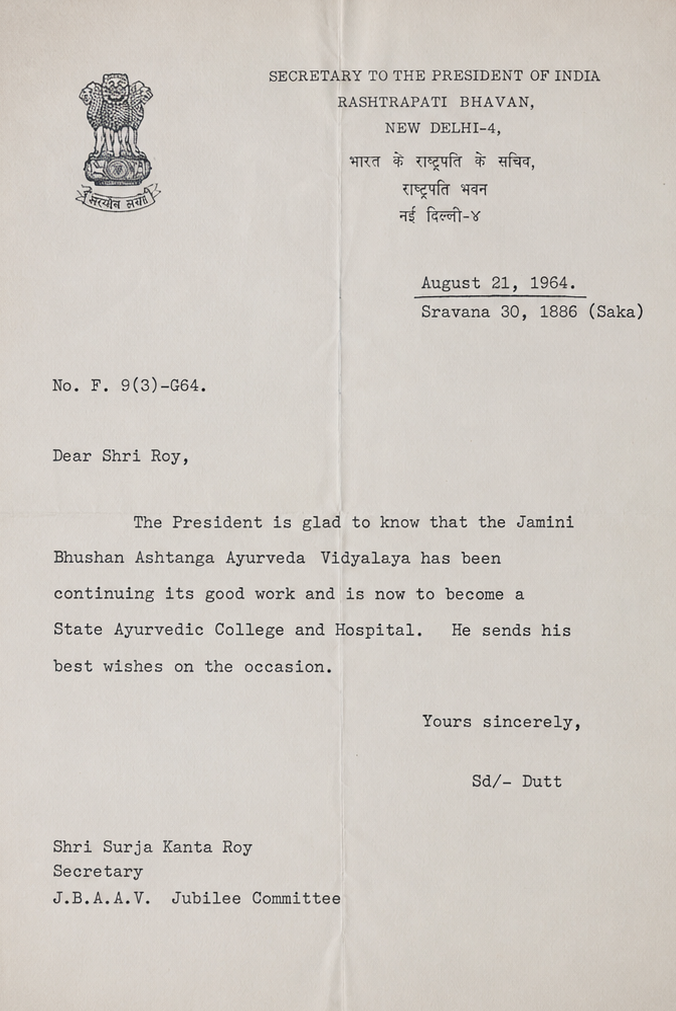
Letter dated 21 August 1964 from Rashtrapati Bhavan conveying President Sarvepalli Radhakrishnan's good wishes following the institution's transition to a State Ayurvedic College and Hospital.

On 21 August 1964, President Sarvepalli Radhakrishnan conveyed his good wishes on the occasion of the institution becoming a State Ayurvedic College and Hospital in a message addressed to the Jubilee Committee through his Secretary at Rashtrapati Bhavan.

== Academics ==
The college is affiliated with the West Bengal University of Health Sciences and recognised by the National Commission for Indian System of Medicine. It offers the Bachelor of Ayurveda, Medicine and Surgery (B.A.M.S.) degree, the standard undergraduate qualification in Ayurvedic medicine in India.

According to the institution's official course information, the B.A.M.S. programme comprises four and a half years of academic study followed by one year of compulsory rotatory internship. The programme has a sanctioned annual intake of 60 students, expandable to 75 students in accordance with government reservation rules.

Academic instruction is organised through fourteen departments staffed by approximately thirty teaching staff and supported by approximately sixty non-teaching staff.

The college's academic departments span the principal areas of Ayurvedic medical education, from foundational subjects such as anatomy and physiology to clinical disciplines including general medicine, surgery, obstetrics and gynaecology, preventive medicine and Panchakarma. The departments retain the Sanskrit names for their respective disciplines, including Kriya Sharir (physiology), Rachana Sharir (anatomy), Kayachikitsa (general medicine) and Shalya Tantra (surgery).

== Hospitals and campuses ==
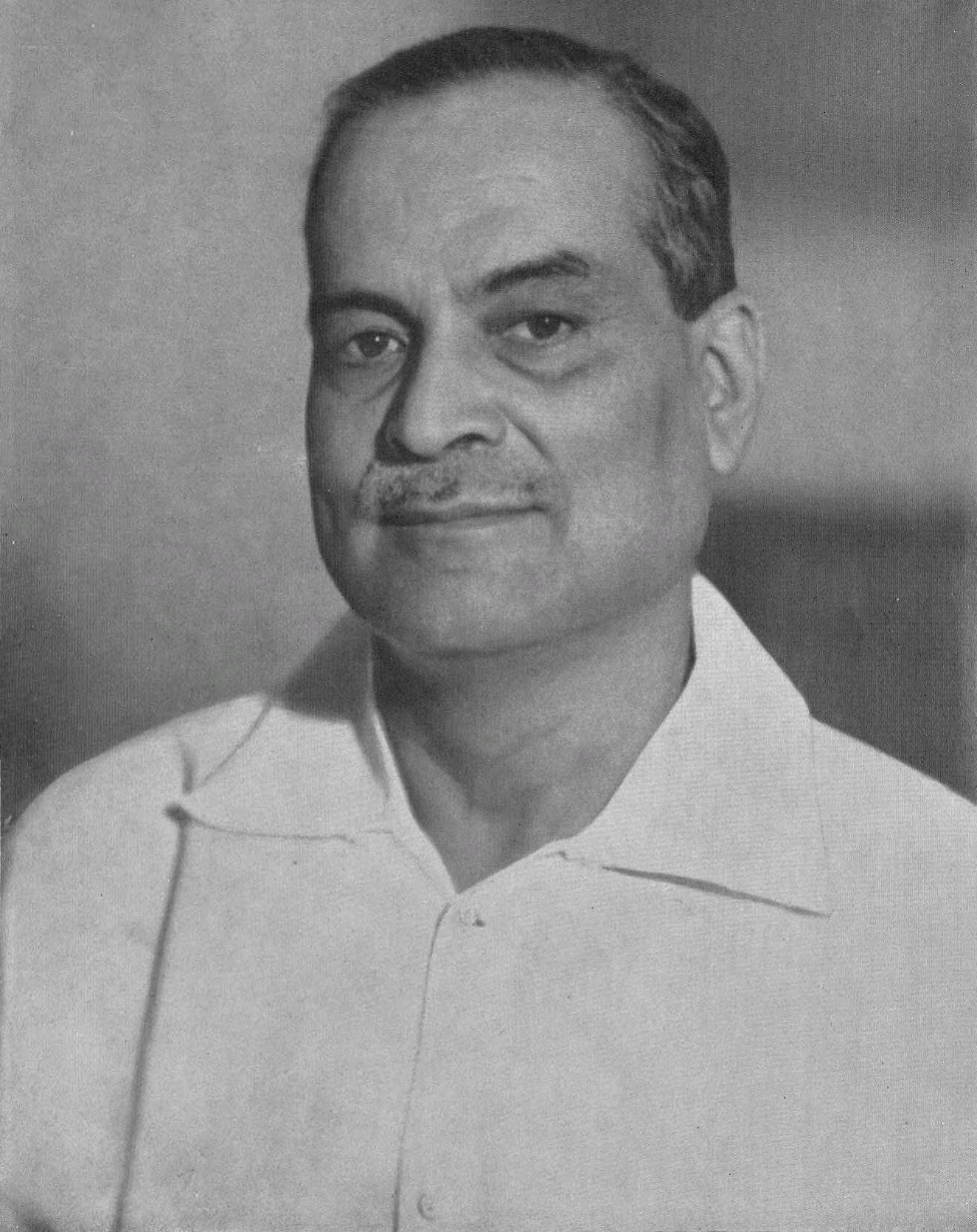
Bidhan Chandra Roy, who laid the foundation stone of the original Patipukur T.B. Hospital

The institution operates two teaching hospitals in Kolkata: its principal campus at Raja Dinendra Street and the annexed Patipukur Ayurvedic Hospital at 29 S. K. Deb Road.

=== Raja Dinendra Street campus ===
The Raja Dinendra Street campus serves as the institution's principal academic and clinical centre. According to the college's infrastructure information, the teaching hospital has 120 beds and provides undergraduate clinical training together with inpatient and outpatient services.

=== Patipukur Ayurvedic Hospital ===
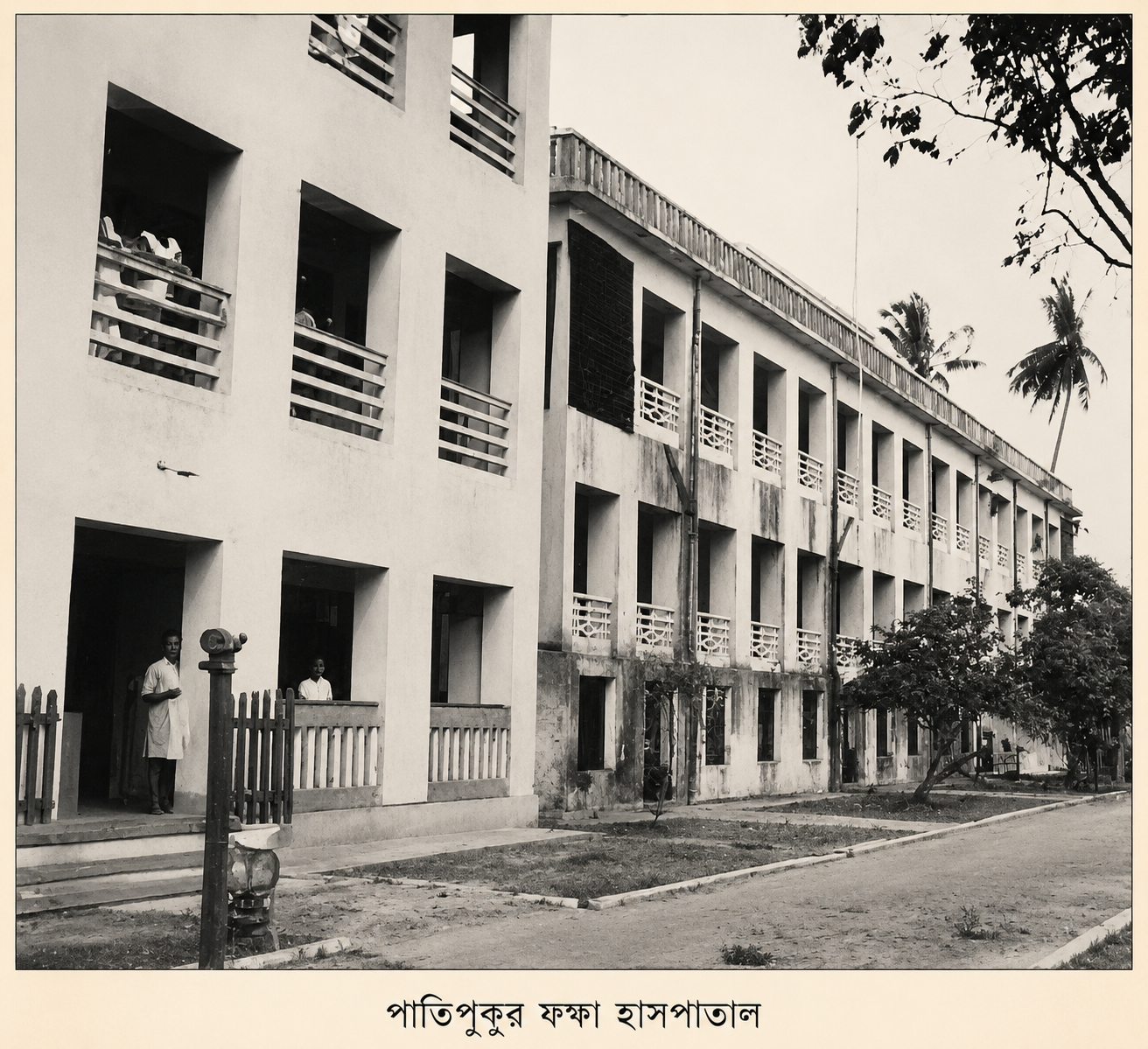
Historic view of Patipukur T.B. Hospital, later reorganised as Patipukur Ayurvedic Hospital.

Patipukur Ayurvedic Hospital is the institution's annexed clinical campus. It originated as the Patipukur T.B. Hospital, established in 1933 on the site of Jamini Bhushan Ray's suburban villa at Patipukur, which he had made available for institutional purposes. The foundation stone was laid by physician and statesman Bidhan Chandra Roy. In 1951, a new three-storey hospital building was inaugurated by the Governor of West Bengal, Harendra Coomar Mookerjee, marking a further stage in the hospital's expansion before its later reorganisation as Patipukur Ayurvedic Hospital. According to the college's infrastructure information, the hospital now has 94 beds and provides both inpatient and outpatient Ayurvedic services.

== Research and public health ==
Research at the college has included clinical investigations, public health initiatives and externally funded projects relating to Ayurvedic medicine.

A 2012 study published in the Journal of Ayurveda and Integrative Medicine investigated adjunct Ayurvedic therapy alongside anti-tubercular drugs in the management of pulmonary tuberculosis. The study included researchers affiliated with J. B. Roy State Ayurvedic Medical College and Hospital.

According to the institution's official records, completed projects have included clinical investigations supported by agencies such as the Department of Science and Technology, Government of West Bengal, while additional externally funded projects are currently in progress.

In 2016, the Millennium Post reported that the Government of West Bengal had approved projects to strengthen the college's Ayurvedic infrastructure, including the construction of a dedicated Panchakarma hospital and improvements to facilities at Patipukur Ayurvedic Hospital.

== Legacy ==
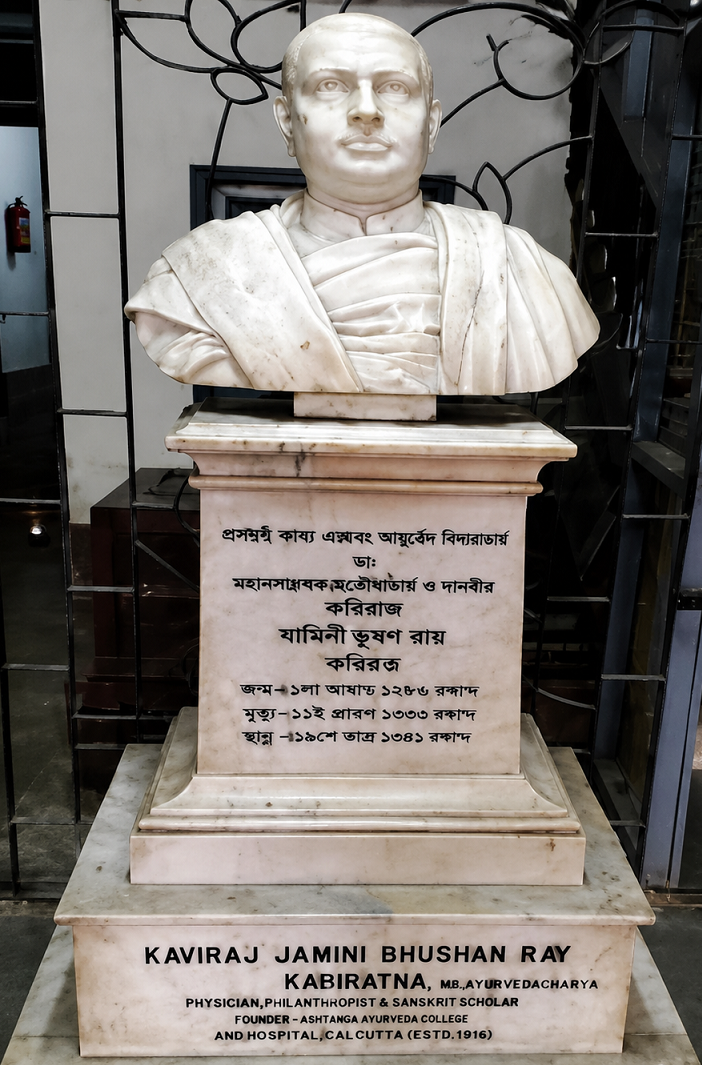
Marble bust of Jamini Bhushan Ray at J. B. Roy State Ayurvedic Medical College and Hospital, Kolkata.

The college is regarded as one of the early institutions that helped establish organised Ayurvedic medical education in Bengal. During the early twentieth century, the institution attracted students from across the Indian subcontinent, including Nepal and Sri Lanka. Among them was the Sri Lankan Ayurvedic pioneer G. P. Wickramarachchi, who later became an important figure in the development of Ayurvedic education in Sri Lanka, replicating this model of institutional learning.

More than a century after its founding, the institution continues to function as one of India's oldest surviving Ayurvedic medical colleges. It reflects Jamini Bhushan Ray's enduring vision of integrating traditional Ayurvedic knowledge with organised medical education, clinical training and public healthcare.

The institution's Raja Dinendra Street premises at 170 and 172 Raja Dinendra Street are included in the Kolkata Municipal Corporation's graded list of heritage buildings as a Grade IIA heritage property, classified as a hospital and medical establishment.

== See also ==
- Healthcare in India
- Ministry of Ayush
- List of ayurveda colleges
