= S. Manu =

High Court Judge from Kelara, India

The Honourable Justice S. Manu

Judge of the Kerala High Court
- Incumbent
- Assumed office 22 March 2024
- Nominated by: D. Y. Chandrachud
- Appointed by: Droupadi Murmu

Personal details
- Born: Kerala
- Spouse: Dr.Remya M.G.
- Education: L.L.M. (Administrative Law, Labour Laws and Industrial Relations)
- Alma mater: Kerala Law Academy
- Website: High Court of Kerala

Manu Sreedharan Nair is an Indian judge serving as a judge of Kerala High Court, the highest court in the Indian state of Kerala and in the Union Territory of Lakshadweep. He was elevated as judge from the bar while he was practicing as a lawyer in various courts in India.

== Early life and education ==
Manu graduated in Science from Sree Vidyadhiraja Nair Service Society College, Vazhoor, obtained graduation in law from Kerala Law Academy and masters in Law in Administrative Law, Labour Laws and Industrial Relations from Annamalai University.

== Career ==
After completing law Manu enrolled as an advocate in Bar Council of Kerala and started practice in 1998. Constitutional Law, Criminal Law, Service Law, Administrative Law, etc. are his specialised practicing area. Served as standing counsel for various institutions, Central Government Counsel, Standing Counsel for Lakshadweep Administration for the High Court of Kerala and Central Administrative Tribunal, Ernakulam Bench, Standing Counsel for Customs and Central Excise, National Board of Examinations in Medical Sciences, Assistant Solicitor General of India & Deputy Solicitor General of India for the Kerala High Court, retainer Counsel for National Investigation Agency, Central Bureau of Investigation, Enforcement Directorate, Directorate of Revenue Intelligence, Sports Authority of India, National Highway Authority of India, Indian Railways, National Commission for Indian System of Medicine, Pharmacy Council of India etc., panel counsel for State Bank of India & Airport Authority of India. On 22 March 2024, he was appointed as an additional judge of Kerala High Court and became permanent judge with effect from 4 March 2026.
