= Government Ayurveda Medical College and Hospital, Mysore =

Traditional Indian medicine, college and hospital

Coordinates: 12.315104°N 76.651444°E

Government Ayurveda Medical College and Hospital
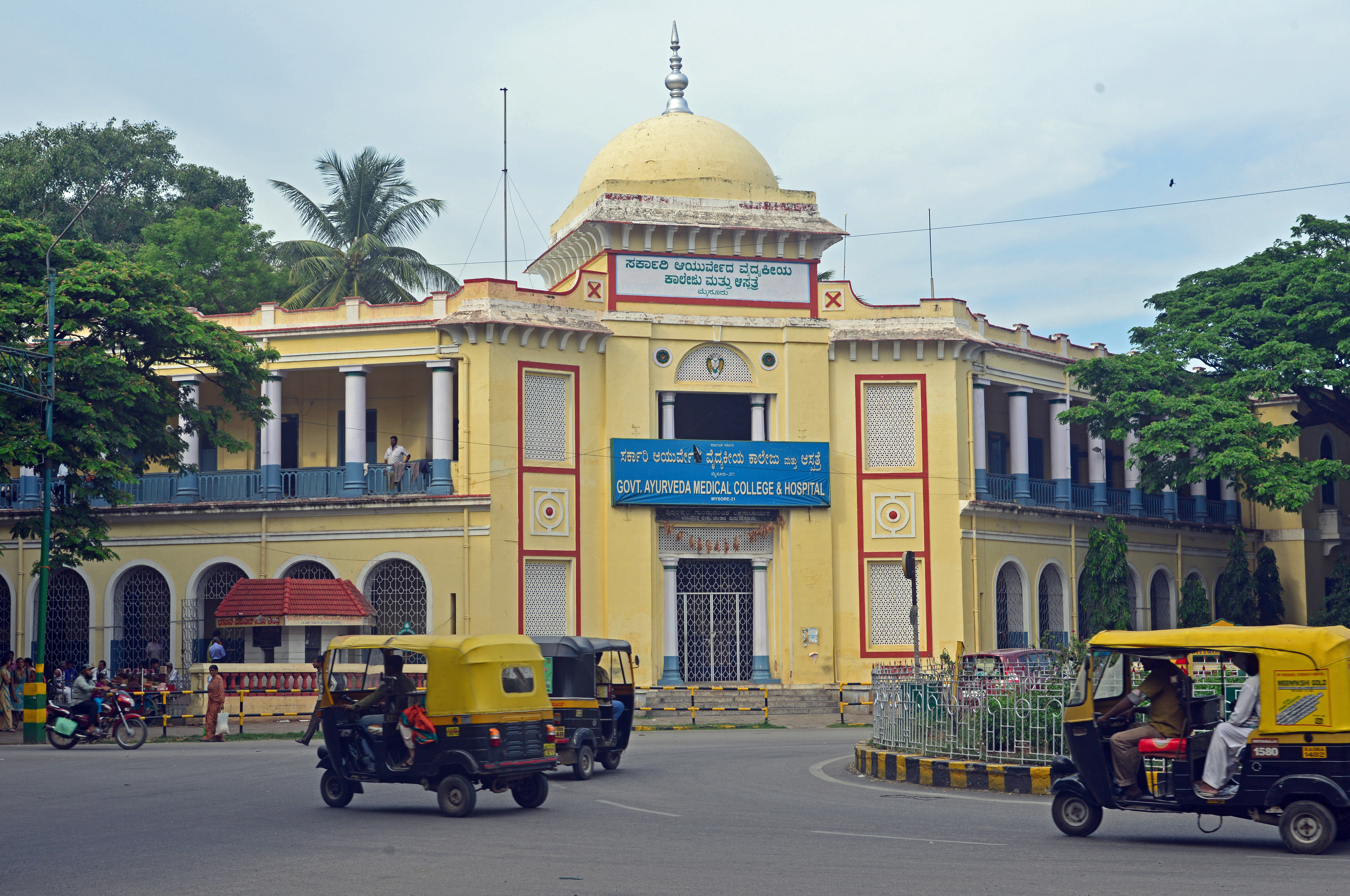
- Type: Government Medical College and Hospital
- Established: 1908
- Affiliations: Rajiv Gandhi University of Health Sciences (RGUHS), Bangalore
- Location: Mysore, Karnataka, India
- Campus: Urban
- Website: http://www.gamcmysore.in/

The Government Ayurveda Medical College and Hospital, (est. 1908) in Mysore is a government run Ayurveda (traditional Indian medicine) college and hospital. It is considered to be the oldest academic institute in India teaching Ayurvedic medicine.

== College ==
The college offers undergraduate courses leading to a Bachelor of Ayurvedic Medicine and Surgery (BAMS) degree and post-graduate courses leading to a Doctor of Medicine (MD) degree in the fields of Ayurveda Siddhantha or Ayurveda Kayachikitsa. In 2018 two new pg department started in panchakarama and swasthavritta.

The college is affiliated with the Rajiv Gandhi University of Health Sciences in Bangalore, a unitary university set up in 1996 by the government of Karnataka for the regulation and promotion of higher education in health sciences throughout the state. It also adheres to all the regulations for education in traditional medicine laid down by the Central Council of Indian Medicine (CCIM), New Delhi.

== Sources ==
- Shankar Bennur (28 November 2008). "A proud moment for Government Ayurveda college". The Hindu.
