= Gananath Sen =

Indian Ayurvedic physician and Sanskrit scholar (1877–1945)

Mahāmahopādhyāya Gananath Sen
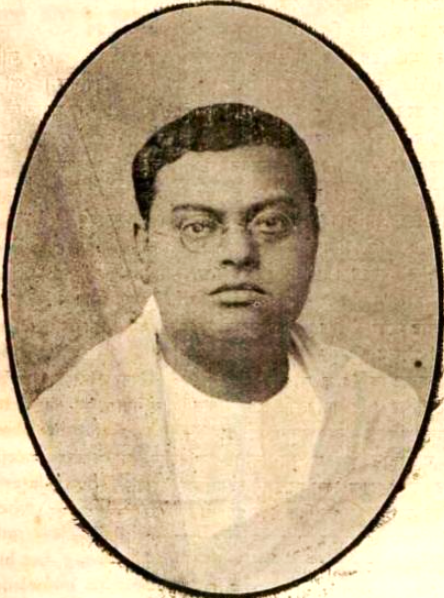
- Born: 1877; Benares, Benares State, British India (present-day Uttar Pradesh, India)
- Died: c. 1945 (aged 66–68)
- Education: Calcutta Medical College (LMS); University of Calcutta (MA)
- Occupations: Ayurvedic physician, scholar, author, teacher
- Organization(s): Vishwanath Ayurved Mahavidyalaya and Hospital, Kolkata
- Notable work: Pratyakṣaśārīram (1913)
- Title: Mahāmahopādhyāya (1916)

Kabiraj Gananath Sen (Bengali: গণনাথ সেন; 1877 – c. 1944/1945) was a Bengali Ayurvedic physician, Sanskrit scholar and teacher.

== Personal life ==
Gananath Sen was born in 1877 into a Baidya Brahmin family in Benares (now Varanasi), Uttar Pradesh, India. He was the son of Viswanath Sen, also an Ayurvedic practitioner and disciple of Kabiraj Gangadhar Roy, a Sanskrit scholar and Ayurvedic physician renowned as one of the founding fathers of modern Ayurveda. He had a son, Kabiraj Sushil Kumar Sen.

== Career ==
Sen, born into a lineage of kobirajes, trained under his father Viswanath Sen, Acharya Kaliprasanna Sen, and Kabiraj Jaynarayan Gupta. Trained in both Ayurvedic and Western medicine, Sen earned his LMS (Licentiate in Medicine and Surgery) from Calcutta Medical College in 1903 and an MA in Sanskrit from the University of Calcutta in 1907. He also established an Ayurvedic dispensary of his own in Sutanuti, Kolkata.

Sen played a significant role in setting up the Faculty of Ayurveda at the Benares Hindu University, and served as its first dean from 1929 to 1931. He also served as the president of the All-India Ayurvedic Congress (AIAC; Hindi: अखिल भारतीय आयुर्वेद महासम्मेलन) thrice, in 1911, 1920 and 1931. In 1932, he founded the Vishwanath Ayurved Mahavidyalaya and Hospital in Kolkata, in honour of his father.

Sen was noted for his efforts to modernize the practice of Ayurveda in India. He advocated for the integration of Ayurveda with allopathy, a proposal which was accepted by modern Ayurvedic practitioners but rejected by orthodox scholars. On February 7, 1916, in his "An Address on Hindu Medicine" delivered at the foundation ceremony of the Benares Hindu University, Sen reiterated the vastness, value and significance of Ayurveda and Hindu medicine, and repeatedly urged the need for its recognition, reform and scientific regeneration. He remarked:

Fortunately for the populace of India, Hindu Medicine (or Ayurveda as it is technically called) has lived a useful and life-giving life even under the weight of ruins. It still fights its humane battles for millions of suffering humanity in this land of its birth. It not only saves many times more people of India than all other systems of Medicine combined, but often conquers by striking cures many foreign rivals who, by the way, are only its own alienated offspring's. It has lived yet, and outlived crushing influences in the past. Provided its claims are fully recognized by the State and people, it will live a good deal more in the present sunshiny days of peace and prosperity. This, I believe, is not a very bold prophecy to make.

Sen also emphasized the grandness and multi-disciplinary nature of Ayurveda. He believed it to be a highly developed "world science," on par with Western medicine. He noted:

"Ayurveda" is the "Science of Life" or the great world science of Medicine, which has for its object not only the protection of human life but also of the life of animals, even of plants. Hindu Medicine is but a poor expression to imply Ayurveda, Ayurveda is not only Medicine but Medicine Surgery, Midwifery, Ophthalmology, Treatment of mental diseases etc. So great indeed was the progress made in Ayurveda that the eight different sections of this great Science and Art had, at one time, schools of different specialists with massive libraries of differentiated literature to back them. I do not propose to go into the details here but I may mention in passing that the very surgical instruments and the many surgical operations which Western surgery boasts of to-day were mostly devised by the Hindu Surgeons.

Sen's famed 1916 address was attended by numerous ruling rajas and maharajas at the time, and also the then Viceroy and Governor-General of India, Charles Hardinge.

In 1914, Sen established Kalpataru Ayurvedic Works at Chitpur, a large-scale manufacturing hub to produce and sell Ayurvedic medicines at moderate prices. In 1932, he was appointed Principal of J.B. Roy State Ayurvedic Medical College & Hospital, Kolkata.

Sen is also remembered for his varied contributions to the field of Ayurveda, the broader Hindu medical tradition, and academia. He translated several English works of biomedical anatomy into Sanskrit, including Gray's Anatomy (1858), Cunningham's Manual of Practical Anatomy, and Sir Henry Morris' The Anatomy of the Joints of Man (1879), among others. Sen also authored multiple books himself: he published the first volume of his anatomy primer, Pratyakṣaśārīram (Perceptible Body) in 1913, and the second in 1941; Siddhanta Nidanam (Principles of Diagnosis) in 1922; Sañjñāpañcaka Vimarśa (A Discourse on the Five Anatomical Terms) in 1931; Sharir Parichay (Introduction to Anatomy) in 1938, and other titles. However, according to Kumar and Cerulli, Sen's integrationist approach may have come at the expense of accidental plagiarism in his works and distortion of classical Sanskrit texts.

Aiming to transform traditional Ayurvedic remedies into modern forms, Sen, in 1921, began conducting clinical research, focusing his attention on the development of injectables, aerosols, and rectal formulations derived from Indian medicinal plants.

Some of Sen's most important work was that on Rauvolfia serpentina, known locally as sarpagandha, a medicinal milkweed indigenous to India. In the early 1930s, Sen, along with physician Kartick Chandra Bose, commenced clinical investigation of the shrub, its properties and antihypertensive effects. They found it had the potential to function as a tranquilizing herb and for lowering blood pressure. In 1931, the pair published a seminal paper on the subject, demonstrating successfully the treatment of psychosis and violent symptoms in patients using alkaloids from the shrub, while also recording its adverse effects. Their work eventually led to the isolation of the alkaloid reserpine in 1950, and was instrumental in the development of drugs for the alleviation of hypertension, schizophrenia, Parkinson's disease and depression, among others. Their research also laid the foundation for reverse pharmacology in India.

Sen also worked tirelessly for the welfare of his community, the Baidyas, and founded a "Baidya Brahmin Somiti" in Kolkata to further their cause.

== Honours ==
The British Indian Government conferred upon him the honorific Mahāmahopādhyāya (Sanskrit: "very great teacher") in 1916. He was also granted other honorary titles during his lifetime, including Vidyasāgara ("ocean of knowledge"), Pranācārya ("royal physician"), and Vaidya Ratna ("jewel of physicians").
