= Central Council of Indian Medicine =

Former Medicine regulatory body of India (1971–2021)

- Abbreviation: CCIM
- Formation: 1971; 55 years ago
- Type: Statutory body
- Purpose: Monitor education for Indian System of Medicine
- Location: New Delhi
- Region served: India
- Parent organisation: Ministry of Ayurveda, Yoga and Naturopathy, Unani, Siddha and Homoeopathy (AYUSH)
- Website: ccimindias.org

Central Council of Indian Medicine (CCIM) was a statutory body under the Ministry of AYUSH, Government of India between 1971 and 2021. The CCIM was set up in 1971 under the Indian Medicine Central Council Act, (Act 48) which was passed in 1970. It is one of the Professional councils under University Grants Commission (UGC) to monitor higher education in Indian systems of medicine, including Ayurveda, Siddha, Unani and Sowa-Rigpa.

== Overview ==
It was located in New Delhi, India. CCIM was set up to suggest the benchmarks and practices to be followed in Indian medicinal systems. CCIM had been involved in regulating the Ayurveda, Siddha and Unani Tibb education courses at the graduate and post-graduate streams.

== Dissolution ==
The parliament and president approved the National Commission for Indian Systems of Medicine (NCISM) on 20 September 2020. In addition to maintaining a national and state register for practitioners, the NCISM legislates for the National Eligibility cum Entrance Test (NEET), and the National Exit Test (NExT).

Since 2021, Central Council of Indian Medicine was dissolved and its role was overtaken by National Commission for Indian System of Medicine. The National Commission for Indian System of Medicine set up according to the National Commission for Indian System of Medicine Act, 2021, will govern the Board of Ayurveda and Unani and the Board of Unani, Siddha and Sowarigpa.

== See also ==
- Central Council of Homoeopathy
