= G. P. Wickramarachchi =

Ceylonese author (1889–1975)

Pandit G. P. Wickramarachchi
- Pandit G. P. Wickramarachchi.
- Born: Gabriyal Perera Wickramarachchi; 28 September 1889; Nadungamuwa Gampaha
- Died: 29 March 1975 (aged 85); Gampaha
- Other names: Gampaha Veda Mahatthaya; Loku Ralahami; Panditha Ralahami; Loku Veda Mahatthaya; Vayidiya Chakravarti; Ayurveda Raja Vayidiya; Ayurveda Chakravarti
- Education: Henegama Government School; Uttharamulla Pirivena; Vidyodaya Pirivena; Jamini Bhushan Ray Ashtanga Ayurvedic Vidyalaya
- Occupation: Ayurveda practitioner
- Spouse: Adhikari Appuhamilage Sumanawathi Jayasundara
- Children: 1 son and 3 daughters
- Parents: Velum Perera Wickramarachchi (father); Sara Nona Dharmawathi (mother)

Senator Gabriyal Perera Wickramarachchi (Sinhala: ජී. පී. වික්‍රමආරච්චි; 28 September 1889 – 29 March 1975) also known as Ayurveda Chakravarti Pandit Wickramarachchi was a distinguished Ceylonese Ayurveda practitioner, author, linguist, senator, notary, lecturer and a philanthropist who founded Gampaha Siddhayurveda Vidyalaya which later became Gampaha Wickramarachchi Ayurveda Institute of University of Kelaniya. He was a member of the Senate of Ceylon from 1957 to 1960.

== Early life and education ==
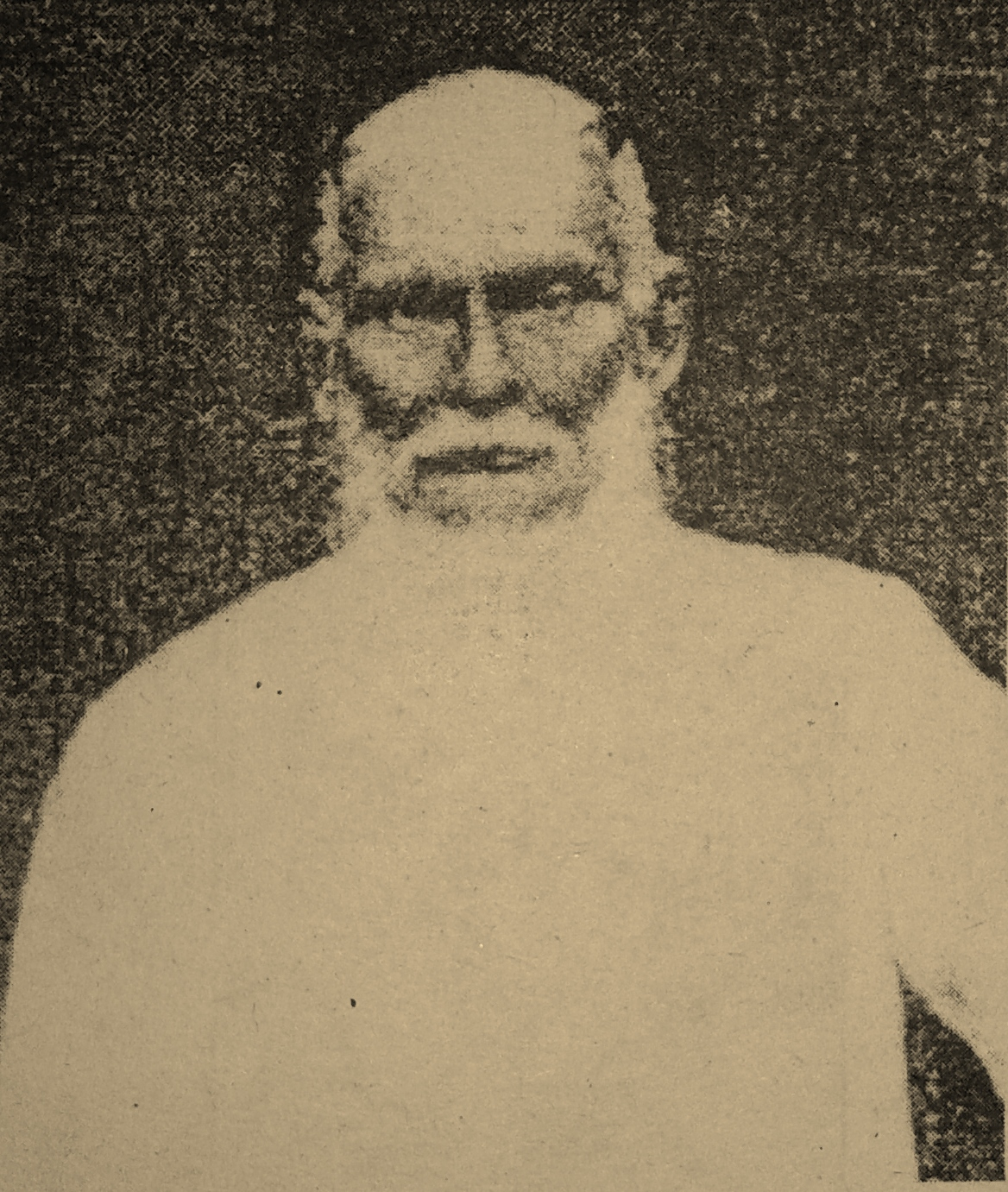
Father, Velum Perera Wickramarachchi Veda Ralahamy.

Wickramarachchi was born on 28 September 1889 in Nadungamuwa Gampaha as the third son of the family to Velum Perera Wickramarachchi, an indigenous medical practitioner and his wife Sara Nona Dharmawathi. He received his primary education at Henegama Government School and secondary education at Uttharamulla Pirivena. He entered the Vidyodaya Pirivena circa.1909 and graduated in oriental languages in 1913 with the title Rajakiya Pandit. In 1917 he sat for the notary exam and became a notary public. The same year he won a scholarship to Jamini Bhushan Ray Ashtanga Ayurvedic Vidyalaya in Calcutta. After three years of studying there he earned his degree of LAMS (Hons) in 1920 and the degree of Kaviranjan from Kaliya Ayurveda Bavan in 1921. Pandit Wickramarachchi married Adhikari Appuhamilage Sumanawathi Jayasundara in 1924, with whom he had one son and three daughters.

== Career and service ==
Pandit Wickramarachchi started his professional career at Gampaha and became the prominent Ayurveda practitioner at that time. He established Gampaha Siddhayurveda Vidyalaya in 1929 and maintained the Vidyalaya at his own expenses and no fees were charged from the students even for lodging. Pandit Wickramarachchi started the medicine factory attached to the Vidyalaya in the 1930s (1932 or 1934).

Wickramarachchi Veda Ralahami was a well disciplined devout Buddhist and rendered his service as the Editor of Sinhala Bauddhaya from 1914 to 1917 in request of the Buddhist revival leader Srimath Anagarika Dharmapala. His contribution for Journals, Magazines and Newspapers was enormous. He wrote five to six books on Ayurveda medicines and a route to a healthy life, even today some of his books such as "Bojana Sangrahaya", "Lakdiva Raktha Roga Sangarahaya" are extremely popular books among the Ayurvedic practitioners and consider them as classics.

The Government of Ceylon in 1957 nominated him as a member of the Senate of Ceylon, in appreciating his services. Considering his professional career, the Vidyodaya University of Ceylon granted him the Degree of Ayurveda Chakravarti in 1960 and later on he was the Dean of the Faculty of Science of Vidyodaya University. He extended his service for 46 years in the Gampaha Siddhayurveda Vidyalaya until 1975.

== Death ==
Pandit Wickramarachchi died peacefully on 29 March 1975 at his home in Gampaha.
