= National Commission for Indian System of Medicine =

National regulatory body for Indian Medicine Systems

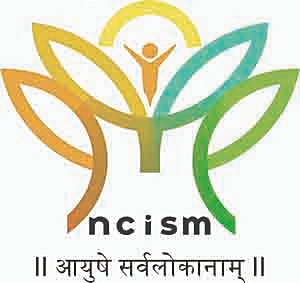
- Abbreviation: NCISM
- Predecessor: Central Council of Indian Medicine
- Formation: 11 July 2021; 4 years ago
- Purpose: Regulatory agency
- Headquarters: New Delhi, Delhi, India
- Chairperson: Maneesha Upendra Kothekar
- Affiliations: Ministry of Ayush
- Website: ncismindia.org

The National Commission for Indian System of Medicine (abbreviate: NCISM) is a statutory and regulatory body of 29 members, formed by Government of India for framing policies for institutions engaged in Indian System of Medicine and medical professionals. It replaced the Central Council of Indian Medicine on 11 June 2021. The institution will have Boards of assessment and rating and Board of ethics and registration of practitioners of Indian systems of medicine. This commission is working under Ministry of Ayush and will govern the Board of Ayurveda and Unani and the Board of Unani, Siddha and Sowarigpa.

== Indian Medicine Central Council Act, 1970 ==
In 1971, Central Council of Indian Medicine was set up under Indian Medicine Central Council Act, 1970 to monitor higher education in Indian systems of medicine, including Ayurveda, Siddha, Unani and Sowa-Rigpa.

== National Commission for Indian System of Medicine Act, 2020 ==
The National Commission for Indian System of Medicine was formed in 2021 by the Government of India as statutory body by passing The National Commission for Indian System of Medicine (NCISM) Bill, 2019. The National Commission for Indian System of Medicine (Amendment) Bill, 2021 was passed in the Lok Sabha, in August 2021, and replaced Indian Medicine Central Council Act, 1970.

The National Commission for Indian System of Medicine set up according to the National Commission for Indian System of Medicine Act, 2020, will govern the Board of Ayurveda and Unani and the Board of Unani, Siddha and Sowarigpa.

== Organisation ==
National Commission for Indian System of Medicine is made up of 29 members appointed by the Central Government.

The organisation has two boards, one for assessing and granting educational institution permission for Indian Systems of Medicine, and the other for ethics and registration of practitioners of Indian systems of medicine.

== Roles and Responsibilities ==
National Commission for Indian System of Medicine is formed with the following roles and responsibilities:

- Frame policies for Institutions engaged in Indian System of Medicine and regulation of medical professionals.
- Assessment of healthcare infrastructure and related human resources.
- Regulations as per bill are adhered by State Medical Councils offering courses in Indian System of Medicine.
- Coordination between autonomous bodies formed under bill.

== See also ==
- Ayurveda
- Indian medicine
- Ministry of Ayush
- Healthcare in India
